= Mount Warrigal =

- Suburb
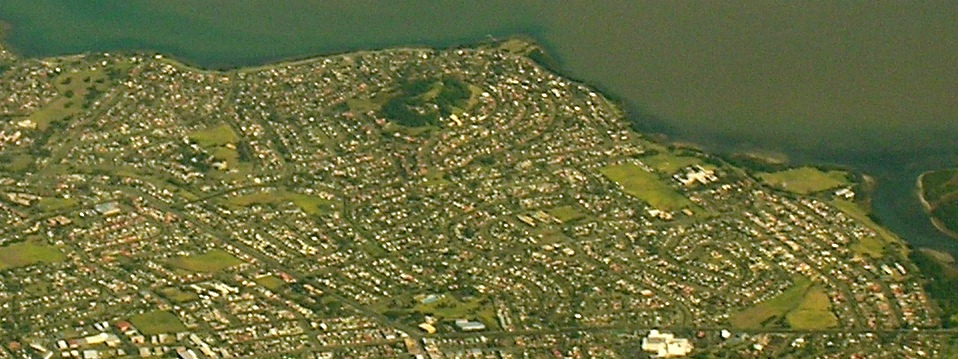
- Aerial view from east

- Coordinates: 34°32.8′S 150°50.6′E
- Country: Australia
- State: New South Wales
- Region: Illawarra
- City: Shellharbour
- LGA: City of Shellharbour

Government
  - State electorate: Shellharbour
  - Federal division: Whitlam

Population
  - Total: 4,880 (2021 census)
- Postcode: 2528
- County: Camden
- Parish: Terragong
Suburbs around Mount Warrigal
Lake Illawarra	Lake Illawarra	Lake Illawarra
Lake Illawarra	Mount Warrigal	Warilla
Oak Flats	Barrack Heights	Warilla

Mount Warrigal is a large suburb of Shellharbour, New South Wales, Australia. The population, according to the 2021 Australian Census, was 4,880. The suburb is in the Shellharbour City LGA.

== Geography ==
The suburb includes "Native Dog Hill", elevation 76 m., and its surrounding areas. To the north and west are the shores of Lake Illawarra. With its high elevation above the surrounding areas and close proximity to the lake, the suburb has excellent views of the Pacific Ocean to the east, Lake Illawarra and the Illawarra Escarpment to both the north and west, and Blackbutt Reserve to the south.

Neighbouring suburbs include Lake Illawarra, Warilla, Barrack Heights and Oak Flats.

== Facilities ==
Shellharbour Hospital is located in Madigan Boulevard, Mount Warrigal. Mount Warrigal also has two small shopping complexes and many public reserves, including Freeman Park which is the only dedicated sporting field. The Stockland Shellharbour shopping centre is in close proximity to the suburb.

At the top of the hill is the Mt Warrigal Nursing Home.

== Education ==
Lake Illawarra High School is on the suburb's north east boundary. The suburb has a primary school, Mount Warrigal Public School established in 1967.

== Notable people ==
- Caitlin Foord – soccer player, played with the Matildas, Arsenal and Sydney FC
- Brett Lee - international cricketer, played Tests, One Day Internationals and T20 Internationals for Australia.
- Shane Lee - international cricket, played One Day Internationals for Australia.
- Natalie Bassingsthwaite - singer, actress and television personality, starred in the Australian Television series Neighbours.
- Alexander Volkanovski - mixed martial artist, first Australian-born fighter to win a UFC title.
