= Division of Throsby =

Former Australian federal electoral division

Coordinates: 34.534°S 150.552°E

Throsby Australian House of Representatives Division
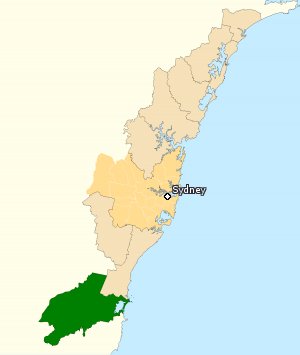
- Division of Throsby (green) in New South Wales
- Created: 1984
- Abolished: 2016
- Namesake: Charles Throsby
- Area: 1,422 km^{2} (549.0 sq mi)
- Demographic: Provincial

The Division of Throsby was an Australian electoral division in the state of New South Wales. The division was named after Charles Throsby, a prominent pioneer and explorer in the early nineteenth century of the areas to the south of Sydney.

The Division of Throsby was created in a redistribution in 1984 and had been represented by Labor since its inception. The Illawarra is one of the few non-metropolitan regions where Labor consistently does well. The area has a strong working-class character due to the presence of industries such as steelmaking, coal mining and stevedoring.

It was renamed the Division of Whitlam in 2016.

== Geography ==
When the division was created in 1984, most of its area were previously part of the Division of Macarthur, with a small area at Shellharbour previously part of the Division of Cunningham. At the time, it covered the Southern Highlands, the South Coast and the Illawarra (including Shellharbour). In the 1992 redistribution, it lost majority of its western portion in the Southern Highlands to Macarthur as well as its areas in the South Coast to the Division of Gilmore, but gained southern Wollongong from Cunningham. As a result, it had shrunk to cover only the Illawarra areas such as Shellharbour and southern Wollongong.

In the 2000 redistribution, the division underwent a minor boundary change in Wollongong. In the 2009 redistribution, it was massively expanded by regaining the Southern Highlands areas from the Division of Hume, but at the same time, it also lost the southern portion of Shellharbour to Gilmore. This lasted until its abolition and replacement by the division of Whitlam in 2016.

Located in the Illawarra, the division covered eastern Wingecarribee Shire, extending from Exeter, Lake Yarrunga and Upper Kangaroo Valley in the south to Aylmerton, Alpine, the Avon Dam, Lake Avon, Dombarton, and Kembla Grange in the north to the Pacific Ocean in the east at Port Kembla, including the northern part of the City of Shellharbour and the southern portion of the adjacent City of Wollongong. Before its abolition, it included Albion Park, Berkeley, Berrima, Blackbutt, Bowral, Cringila, Dapto, Exeter, Fitzroy Falls, Horsley, Kembla Grange, Lake Illawarra, Mittagong, Moss Vale, Oak Flats, Port Kembla, Robertson, Warrawong, Welby, Willow Vale, and parts of Warilla.

== Renaming to Whitlam ==
In honour of former Prime Minister Gough Whitlam, the Australian Electoral Commission announced in 2015 that it would rename the Division of Throsby as the Division of Whitlam, to take effect at the 2016 federal election.

There were two formally lodged objections for renaming Throsby to Whitlam on the basis that the former Prime Minister's connection with the Illawarra area, particularly in the seat of Throsby, is limited to non-existent, and that it would be better suited to rename Whitlam's old parliamentary seat of Werriwa in his honour. One of the objections lodged by a Councillor of Wollongong Council stated the matter was "hotly debated in the Wollongong community since the announcement" and that council had voted against supporting the proposed change.

However, the change took effect on 25 February 2016.

== Members ==
Image	Member	Party	Term	Notes
	Colin Hollis (1938–)	Labor	1 December 1984 – 8 October 2001	Previously held the Division of Macarthur. Retired
	Jennie George (1947–)	Labor	10 November 2001 – 19 July 2010	Retired
	Stephen Jones (1965–)	Labor	21 August 2010 – 2 July 2016	Transferred to the Division of Whitlam after Throsby was abolished in 2016
