= Flinders, New South Wales =

Flinders Shellharbour, New South Wales
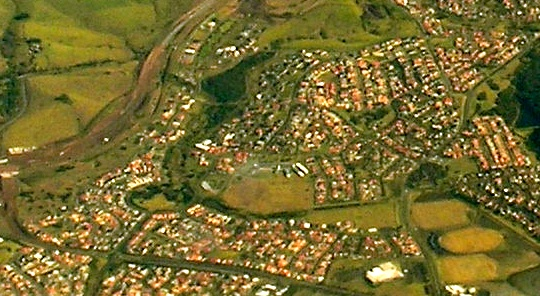
- aerial photograph of Flinders

- Coordinates: 34.580°S 150.846°E
- Population: 7,118 (2021 census)
- Postcode(s): 2529
- Elevation: 20 m (66 ft)
- Location: 111 km (69 mi) from Sydney; 26 km (16 mi) from Wollongong; 14 km (9 mi) from Kiama
- LGA(s): City of Shellharbour
- Region: Illawarra
- County: Camden
- Parish: Terragong
- State electorate(s): Shellharbour
- Federal division(s): Whitlam
Suburbs around Flinders:
Blackbutt	Barrack Heights	Barrack Point
	Flinders	Shellharbour
Croom	Shell Cove

Flinders is a southern suburb of Shellharbour, located in the Illawarra region of New South Wales, Australia. Flinders is located approximately 111 kilometres south-southwest of New South Wales' capital city of Sydney. Flinders is close to a number of beaches and to and over 60 hectares of green open spaces including bush reserves, waterways and landscaped parks. Flinders adjoins neighbouring suburbs of Shellharbour, Shell Cove, Blackbutt and Shell Heights.

The area is served by the Shellharbour Junction railway station which replaced the previous Dunmore railway station on 22 November 2014. It was initially intended to call the new station Flinders. Premier Illawarra operates one bus route between Flinders and the railway station, namely route 52 to Shellharbour Junction railway station.
