= Shellharbour Junction railway station =

Railway station in New South Wales, Australia

Shellharbour Junction
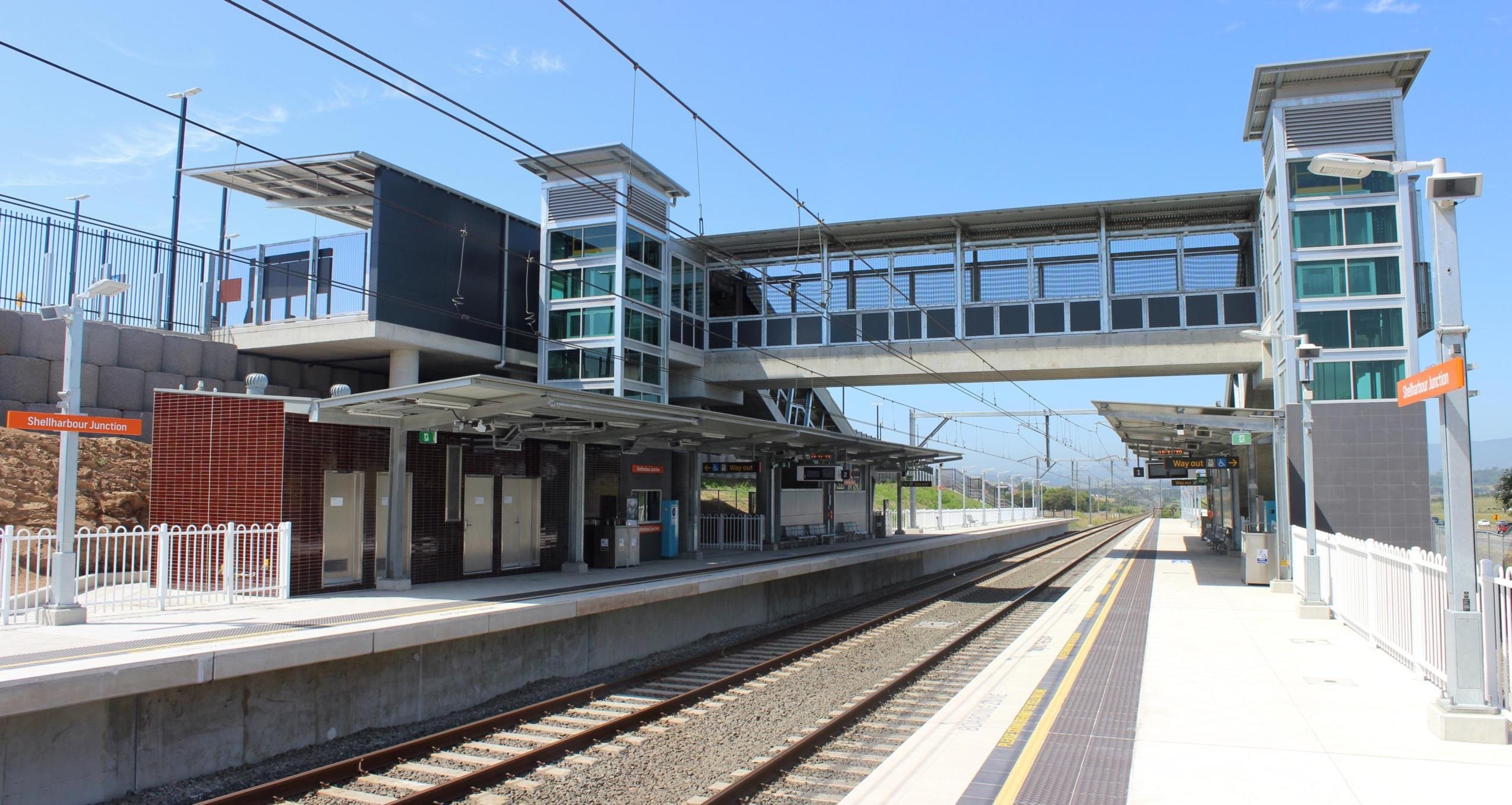
- Northbound view from Platform 2, November 2014

General information
- Location: Piper Drive, Dunmore; New South Wales; Australia
- Coordinates: 34°35′30″S 150°50′46″E
- Elevation: 29 metres (95 ft)
- Owner: Transport Asset Manager of New South Wales
- Line: South Coast
- Distance: 108.887 kilometres (67.659 mi) from Central
- Platforms: 2 side, 174 metres (571 ft)
- Train operators: Sydney Trains
- Bus operators: Premier Illawarra

Construction
- Structure type: At-grade
- Parking: 105 spaces
- Cycle facilities: Bike racks
- Accessible: Yes

Other information
- Website: Transport for NSW

History
- Opened: 9 November 1887
- Rebuilt: 22 November 2014
- Electrified: 17 November 2001
- Former names: Dunmore; Dunmore (Shellharbour); Flinders; Shell Cove; Shellharbour

Passengers
- 2025: 95,440 (year); 261 (daily) (Sydney Trains, NSW TrainLink)

Services
Preceding station	Intercity Trains	Following station
Minnamurra towards Kiama	South Coast Line	Oak Flats towards Central or Bondi Junction
Location

Shellharbour Junction railway station is a railway station located in Dunmore in the City of Shellharbour, New South Wales, Australia, on the Illawarra railway line. The station is served by Sydney Trains South Coast Line trains traveling south to Kiama and north to Wollongong and Sydney. Premier Illawarra operates a connecting bus service from the station to Shellharbour.

== History ==
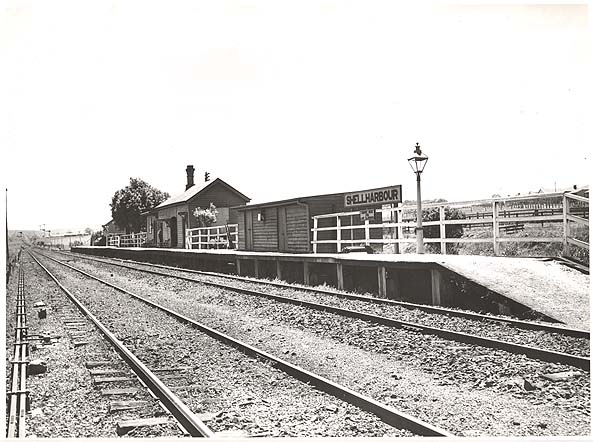
Historical photo of Shellharbour station

The Shellharbour district was initially reliant on coastal shipping for its connection to Wollongong and Sydney, but this changed with the construction of the South Coast railway line to Wollongong in 1887, and its connection to Sydney the following year. Dunmore Station opened along with the Wollongong–North Kiama extension in 1887, with a single platform, weatherboard platform building and Victorian–Georgian brick stationmaster's residence. The station was used by passengers from nearby Shellharbour; the main freight users were local pastoralists and the neighbouring basalt quarry. The growth in quarry traffic necessitated the construction of a goods siding in 1923 and a signal box two years later. The station was refurbished around the same time. In 1940, a second side platform ("platform 1") was added. The flow of rail freight from the district waned in the late 20th century, however, and the goods siding was removed in 1970. The old station buildings, still extant today, are located near where Dunmore Road (formerly Shellharbour Road) intersects with the railway line, at the southern end of Dunmore.

The book All aboard!: Tales of Australian railways, by Jim Haynes and Russell Hannah, recounts a story about former State Rail Authority Chief Executive David Hill, who is said to have visited Dunmore Station incognito in the mid-1980s, when the station appeared on maps as "Shellharbour":

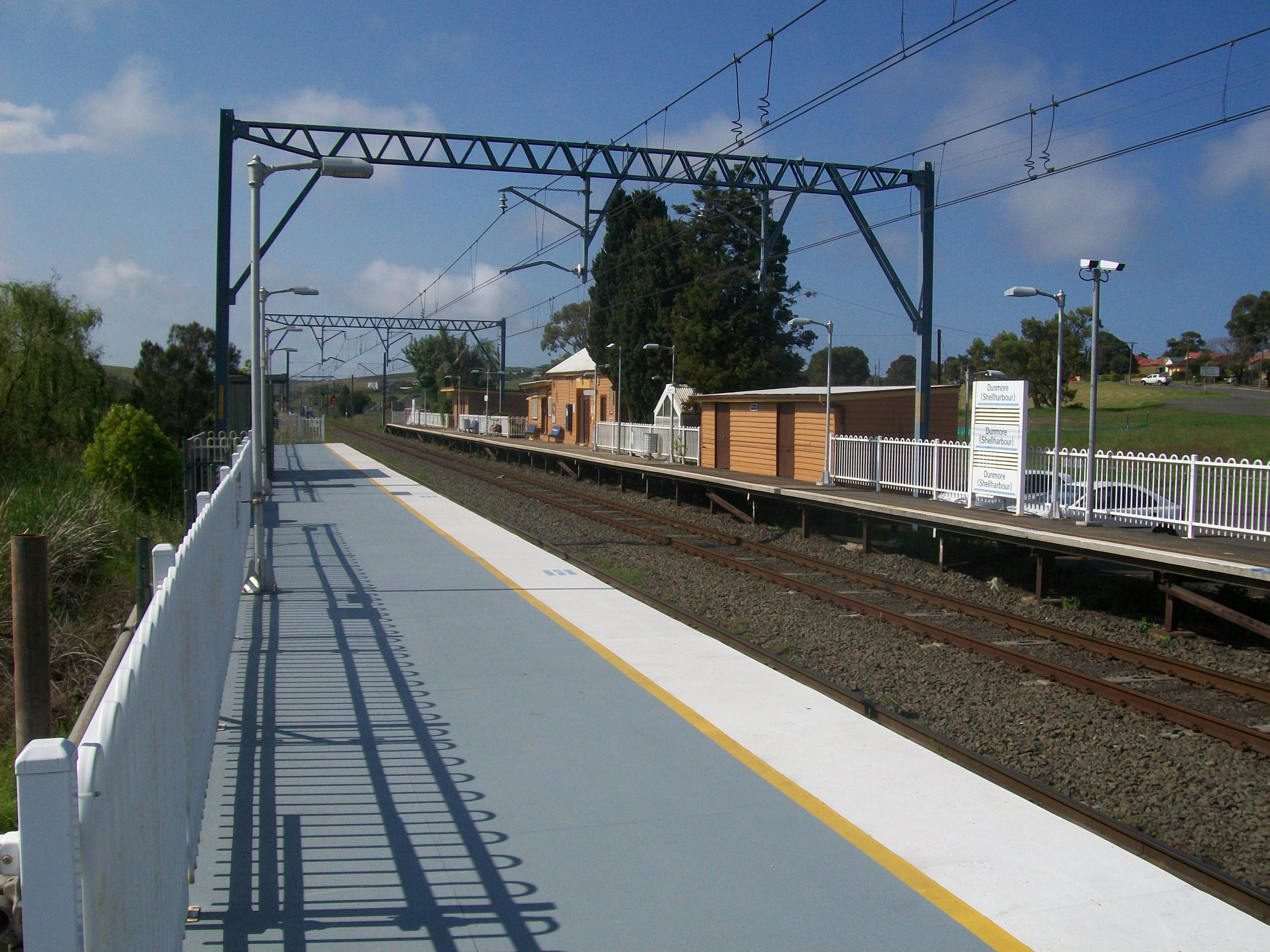
Dunmore (Shellharbour) station in the 2010s

When he reached Shellharbour Station he found himself surrounded by cow paddocks with the straggle of houses on the other side of the road. Now David Hill was no dill and he realised that this couldn’t possibly be the resort town of Shellharbour even though the station signs were telling him so – after all he couldn’t even see the sea.

It was still the days when the railways employed people and there, waiting to collect his ticket, was a 16-year-old junior station assistant.

"Well” says David to the kid; “This clearly isn’t Shellharbour Township”.

“No mate” says the kid (he didn’t know who David Hill was, you see, or he would have called him sir). “This is Dunmore.”

“Well where’s Shellharbour?” asks David.

The kid points up Shellharbour Road and says “it's up the road there a bit, just over the hill – it’s about four or five kilometres away.”

“That’s a bit strange,” muses David. “Wouldn’t you have thought that they would have built the station a bit closer to the town than this?’’

Well, the kid looks at David Hill like he’s a bit simple and says; “No mate, it’s much better down here near the railway line.”

According to the story, it was this visit that led to the nameboards and maps being amended to read "Dunmore (Shellharbour)".

== New site ==
Given the rapid growth of new suburbs along the railway line, including Shell Cove and Flinders, in 2003 RailCorp began planning work to relocate Dunmore's railway station to the north. The project was announced as "Flinders Station" by the then member for Kiama, Matt Brown, in 2011. His successor, Gareth Ward, re-announced the project the following year, and construction began, with an announced budget of $39 million. In 2013, Ward announced that the name would be changed to Shell Cove, but it later emerged that the station could not be named Shell Cove (or Flinders) because it was physically located in Dunmore. Transport for NSW successfully applied to the Geographical Names Board to have the station named Shellharbour Junction instead.

The project also saw the Dunmore passing loop extended north to the new station site, increasing its length to 1.8 kilometres.

The new station opened to passengers on 22 November 2014. Services to the former Dunmore Station ceased the previous day, and the old station was fenced off pending a decision on its future use.

Shellharbour Junction recorded 10,616 passenger journeys in the first three months of 2015, almost as many as the number of journeys recorded by Dunmore Station in its last full year of operation.

== Platforms and services ==
Platform	Line	Stopping pattern	Notes
1	South Coast Line	services to Sydney Central & Bondi Junction	
2	South Coast Line	services to Kiama	

== Transport links ==
Premier Illawarra operates one bus route via Shellharbour Junction station, under contract to Transport for NSW:

- 52: to Flinders
