= Albion Park railway station =

Railway station in New South Wales, Australia

Albion Park
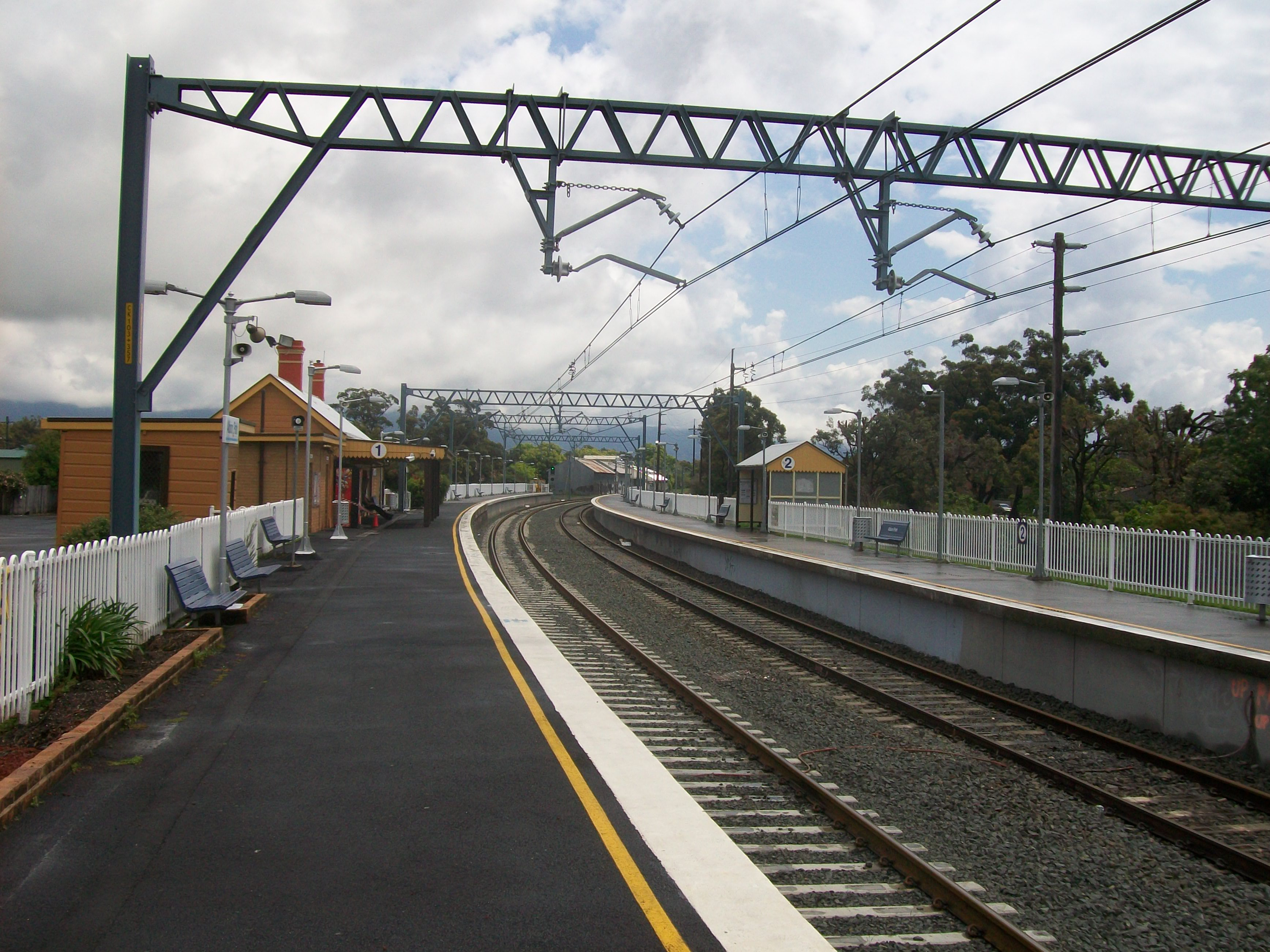
- North-west bound view from Platform 1, January 2008

General information
- Location: Princes Highway, Albion Park Rail, New South Wales; Australia
- Coordinates: 34°33′48″S 150°47′57″E
- Elevation: 6 metres (20 ft)
- Owner: Transport Asset Manager of New South Wales
- Operator: Sydney Trains
- Line: South Coast
- Distance: 103.341 km (64.213 mi) from Central
- Platforms: 2 side (212 and 196 metres)
- Train operators: Sydney Trains
- Bus operators: Premier Illawarra; NSW TrainLink / Roadcoach
- Connections: Coach

Construction
- Structure type: At-grade
- Parking: Yes
- Cycle facilities: Bike racks
- Accessible: Assisted Access
- Architectural style: Late Victorian

Other information
- Status: Weekdays: Staffed: 5.35am to 10.35am, 2.30pm to 7.30pm: Weekends and public holidays: Unstaffed
- Website: Transport for NSW

History
- Opened: 9 November 1887
- Electrified: 17 November 2001
- Former names: Oak Flats (1887–1888)

Passengers
- 2025: 146,070 (year); 400 (daily) (Sydney Trains, NSW TrainLink)

Services
Preceding station	Intercity Trains	Following station
Oak Flats towards Kiama	South Coast Line	Dapto towards Central or Bondi Junction
Former services
Preceding station	Former services	Following station
Oak Flats towards Bomaderry	South Coast Line (1887-1974)	Yallah towards Sydney

New South Wales Heritage Register
- Official name: Albion Park Railway Station Group
- Type: State heritage (complex / group)
- Designated: 2 April 1999
- Reference no.: 1072
- Type: Railway Platform / Station
- Category: Transport – Rail
- Builders: William Monie & Company (station); David Proudfoot & Thomas Logan (single rail line)
Location
- Location within New South Wales

Albion Park railway station is a heritage-listed railway station located on the South Coast railway line on the Princes Highway in Albion Park Rail, New South Wales, Australia. The station was designed by New South Wales Government Railways and built during 1887 by William Monie & Company, with the single line railway line built by David Proudfoot and Thomas Logan. The complex is also known as the Albion Park Railway Station Group. The property was added to the New South Wales State Heritage Register on 2 April 1999. The station is located close to Shellharbour Airport.

== History ==
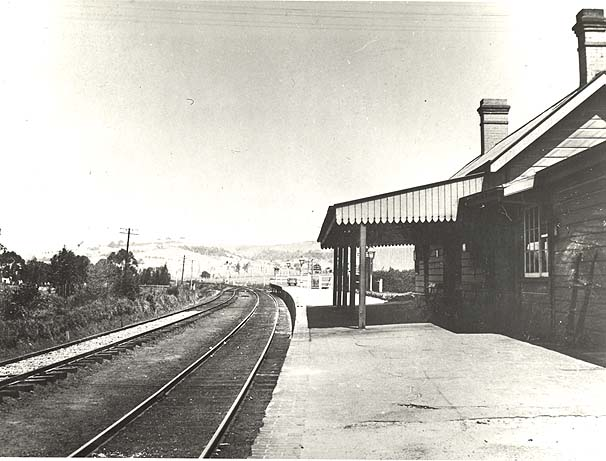
The station in 1940

The township of Shellharbour was laid out in 1851 around the port of Shellharbour. Shellharbour (Municipal) Council was constituted on 4 June 1859 and the chambers, built in 1865 were located in Shellharbour. The council relocated to Albion Park in 1897, coinciding with the decline of Shellharbour (Village) and the growth of Albion Park as a lucrative beef and dairy cattle district.

Engineers choosing the alignment for the Illawarra railway line in the 1880s sought the shallow grades required by the steam locomotives of the time. As a result, when a route through the Municipality of Shellharbour was chosen, it was some way from the two major towns, Albion Park and Shellharbour. The future Albion Park station opened as Oak Flats on 9 November 1887 as part of the isolated Wollongong to Bombo (North Kiama) line. At the same time, an Albion Park station opened three kilometres (one point nine miles) to the north. The following year, Albion Park was renamed Yallah and Oak Flats became Albion Park. An Oak Flats station opened in 1890. Yallah station closed in 1974.

The site had a substantial yard arrangement making it one of the more significant locations south of Wollongong. The site was developed just prior to the railway design standardisation that took place around 1890 and the buildings were some of the last of the "old" design station buildings to be built. At the opening of the station there was a crossing loop and goods siding branching to the horse dock and standard side loading shed (since demolished). In 1885 a brick station master's residence (J2 design) was built. In 1890 a weatherboard signal box was constructed between the 1887 platform building and 1887 out of room and in 1913 a siding was provided for the Central Co-operative Dairy Company factory, which still exists and was purchased by RailCorp in 1993.

As a centre for the pastoral and dairy industries, the station precinct grew, gaining a dairy factory and associated siding in 1913. As the closest point on the railway to Albion Park, the area around the station grew into a small town in its own right and was named Albion Park Rail in 1921 – one of three localities in New South Wales to be named in this way (the others are Eungai Rail on the Mid-North Coast and Warialda Rail in New England).

In 2001, the line from Dapto to Kiama was electrified. A second platform, with awning and waiting shed, was constructed to provide a crossing point for trains and increase the line's capacity. Also in 2001, the station master's residence (197 Princes Highway) was sold. In 2013, the pedestrian level crossing between the two platforms was modified to meet wheelchair access requirements.

== Platforms and services ==
Albion Park has two side platforms. It is serviced by Sydney Trains South Coast line services travelling between Sydney Central, Bondi Junction and Kiama. Normally northbound trains depart from platform 1 and southbound trains depart from platform 2.

Platform	Line	Stopping pattern	Notes
1	SCO	services to Sydney Central & Bondi Junction	
2	SCO	services to Kiama	

== Transport links ==
Premier Illawarra operates three bus routes via Albion Park station, under contract to Transport for NSW:

- 37: Wollongong Beach to Wollongong station via Oak Flats & Shellharbour anti-clockwise loop
- 57: Wollongong station to Wollongong Beach via Shellharbour & Oak Flats clockwise loop
- 77: Albion Park to Stockland Shellharbour

Albion Park is also served by NSW TrainLink coach services between Wollongong and Bundanoon.

== Heritage listing ==
As at 18 April 2013, Albion Park Rail Station – including its 1887 platform building, lamp room, out-of-room and original Platform 1, 1890 signal box, and movable items – is of State heritage significance. Albion Park Railway Station is of State historical significance as a railway station which was a major goods yard servicing the dairy and pastoral industry, retaining structures built from 1887 to 1890, constructed prior to the standardisation of railway design and being among the last "old" design station buildings built.

The station retains its physical association with the Central Co-operative Dairy Company factory built in 1913 with a siding, and with the extant station masters residence at 197 Princes Highway (residence no longer in RailCorp ownership). The weatherboard station buildings are of State aesthetic significance as a rare collection of vernacular weatherboard late Victorian period railway station buildings dating from 1887 to 1890, the platform building being one of the two most intact (with Bulli) of four extant examples of weatherboard platform buildings of a design known as "third class station buildings" on the Illawarra line. Early signalling equipment within the signal box (signal levers, staff instrument) is representative of historical railway signalling technology.

Albion Park railway station was listed on the New South Wales State Heritage Register on 2 April 1999 having satisfied the following criteria.

The place is important in demonstrating the course, or pattern, of cultural or natural history in New South Wales.

Albion Park Railway Station is of State historical significance as a railway station which was a major goods yard servicing the dairy and pastoral industry, retaining structures built from 1887 to 1890, constructed prior to railway design standardisation and being among the last "old" design station buildings built. The station retains its physical association with the Central Co-operative Dairy Company factory built in 1913 with a siding, and with the extant Station Master's residence at 197 Princes Highway (residence no longer in RailCorp ownership).

The place is important in demonstrating aesthetic characteristics and/or a high degree of creative or technical achievement in New South Wales.

The weatherboard station buildings are of State aesthetic significance as a collection of vernacular late Victorian period railway station buildings dating from 1887 to 1890. The platform building retains both original chimneys, and is one of the two most intact (with Bulli) of four extant examples of a weatherboard 3rd class platform building on the Illawarra line. The early signalling equipment and staff instrument within the signal box are of technical significance as early NSW Railways operational equipment.

The place has a strong or special association with a particular community or cultural group in New South Wales for social, cultural or spiritual reasons.

The place has the potential to contribute to the local community's sense of place, and can provide a connection to the local community's past.

The place has potential to yield information that will contribute to an understanding of the cultural or natural history of New South Wales.

Early signalling equipment within the signal box (signal levers, staff instrument) are of research significance as historical railway operational technology.

The place possesses uncommon, rare or endangered aspects of the cultural or natural history of New South Wales.

The collection of weatherboard station buildings including lamp room, out of room and signal box at Albion Park dating from 1887 to 1890 are rare, being one of a few Illawarra line railway stations to retain late 19th century weatherboard station buildings (along with Dapto, Thirroul, Bulli, Shellharbour, Bombo and Berry). The platform building is one of only four 3rd class weatherboard platform buildings on the Illawarra line.

The place is important in demonstrating the principal characteristics of a class of cultural or natural places/environments in New South Wales.

The platform building is a good representative weatherboard 3rd class platform building, one of only 4 weatherboard examples of this platform building type on the Illawarra line (others at Bulli, Dapto and Thirroul), of which Albion Park, along with Bulli, are the two most intact examples. Early signalling equipment within the signal box (signal levers, staff instrument) is representative of historical railway operational technology.

== See also ==
- List of regional railway stations in New South Wales
