= Oak Flats railway station =

Railway station in New South Wales, Australia

Oak Flats
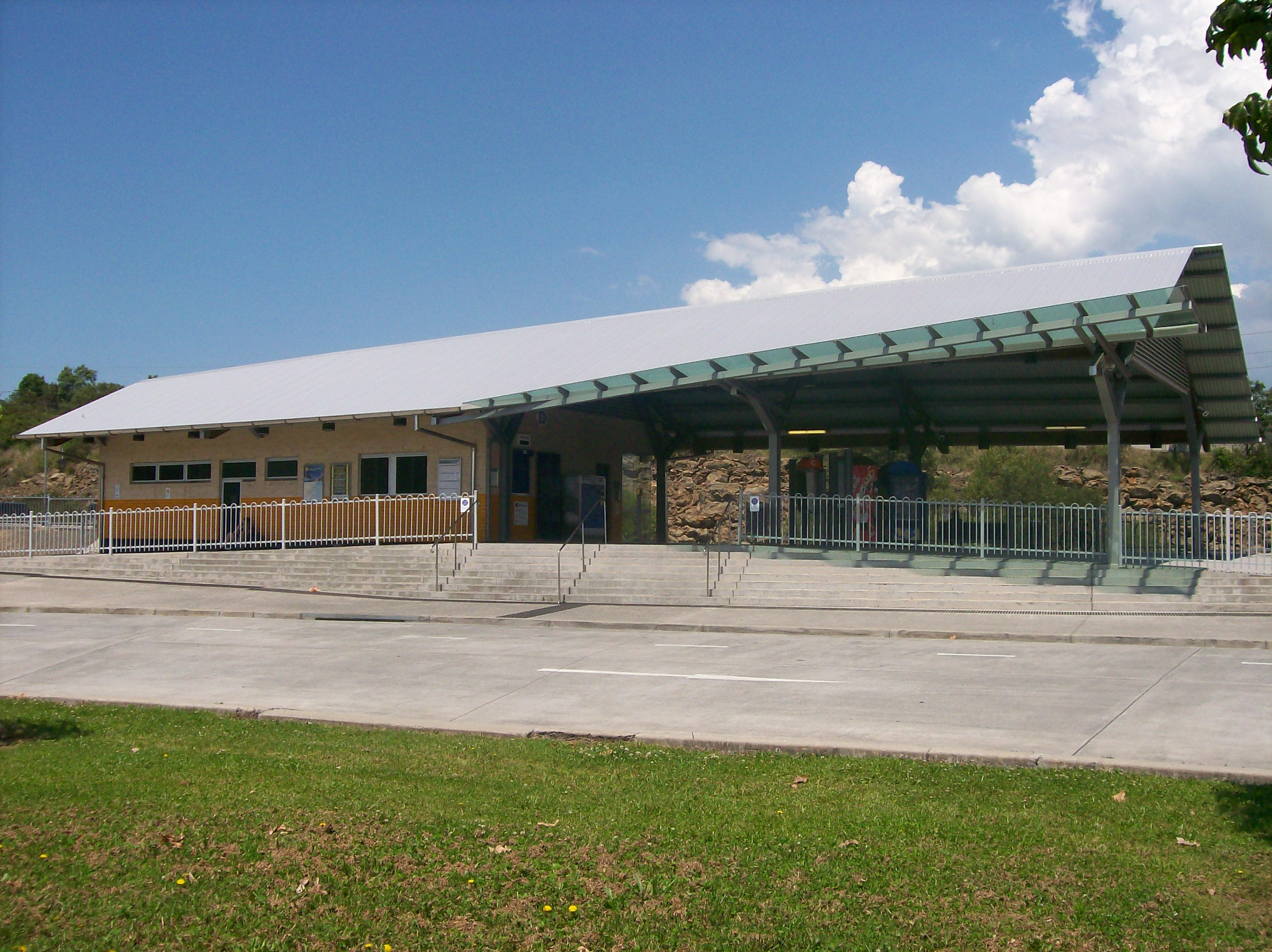
- Station building and entrance to the platform, January 2006

General information
- Location: Stanford Drive, Oak Flats; New South Wales; Australia
- Coordinates: 34.571982°S 150.820323°E
- Elevation: 15 metres (49 ft)
- Owner: Transport Asset Manager of New South Wales
- Operator: Sydney Trains
- Line: South Coast
- Distance: 105.522 kilometres (65.568 mi) from Central
- Platforms: 1 (200 metres)
- Train operators: Sydney Trains
- Bus operators: Premier Illawarra

Construction
- Structure type: At-grade
- Parking: 380 spaces
- Cycle facilities: Yes
- Accessible: Yes

Other information
- Status: Weekdays: Staffed: 5.35 am to 7 pm: Weekends and public holidays: Unstaffed
- Website: Transport for NSW

History
- Opened: 1925
- Rebuilt: 21 February 2003
- Electrified: 17 November 2001

Passengers
- 2025: 204,548 (year); 560 (daily) (Sydney Trains, NSW TrainLink)

Services
Preceding station	Intercity Trains	Following station
Shellharbour Junction towards Kiama	South Coast Line	Albion Park towards Central or Bondi Junction
Location

Oak Flats railway station is a railway station located in Oak Flats, New South Wales, Australia, on the South Coast railway line. The station serves Sydney Trains travelling south to Kiama and north to Wollongong and Sydney. Together with the Dunmore and later Shellharbour Junction stations, Oak Flats has long served as the rail connection for the coastal suburbs of the City of Shellharbour.

== History ==
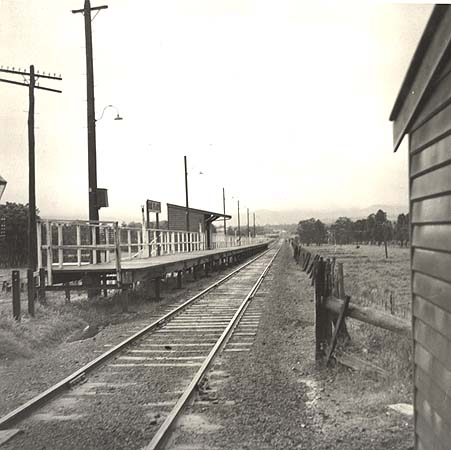
The former station, 1951

The railway reached the area in 1887, when the South Coast Line was extended from Wollongong to North Kiama. Initially stations were only provided at Dunmore and Albion Park – although Albion Park Station was known as Oak Flats until the following year.

Local politician and sometime Premier of New South Wales George Fuller was a prominent landholder in the district – his father had named Dunmore – and in 1921 he subdivided some of his land at Oak Flats, on the southern shore of Lake Illawarra. The development of a residential area over the next few years spurred the NSW Government Railways to build a station for the new subdivision; this opened in 1925. The original station featured a single wooden platform and small, skillion-roofed weatherboard waiting shed.

Concerns over accessibility and a constrained site led the State Rail Authority to relocate the station in 2003. The $6 million interchange, built by Bovis Lend Lease on a new site 400 metres east of the original, opened on 21 February. The building features a double pitched roof, a band of tangerine-coloured glazed bricks, recycled timber beams and distinctive Y-shaped steel columns. Opening the new facility, then Transport Minister Carl Scully described it as "one of the best railway stations in the state." A plan to name the new station "Shellharbour City (Oak Flats)" was abandoned following community opposition. The earlier station was subsequently demolished.

Electronic ticketing, in the form of the Opal smart card, has been available at Oak Flats since 2014.

== Croom Tunnel ==
Immediately to the east of Oak Flats Station is the 40-metre-long Croom Tunnel, said to be the shortest railway tunnel in NSW.

== Platforms and services ==
Oak Flats has one side platform. It is serviced by Sydney Trains South Coast line services travelling between Sydney Central, Bondi Junction and Kiama.

Platform	Line	Stopping pattern	Notes
1	South Coast Line	services to Sydney Central, Bondi Junction & Kiama	

== Transport links ==
Premier Illawarra operates six bus routes via Oak Flats station, under contract to Transport for NSW:

- 37: Wollongong Beach to Wollongong station via Oak Flats & Shellharbour anti-clockwise loop
- 51: to University of Wollongong
- 53: to University of Wollongong
- 57: to Wollongong station to Wollongong Beach via Shellharbour & Oak Flats clockwise loop
- 76: Albion Park to Stockland Shellharbour
- 77: Albion Park to Stockland Shellharbour
