= Oak Flats =

- Suburb
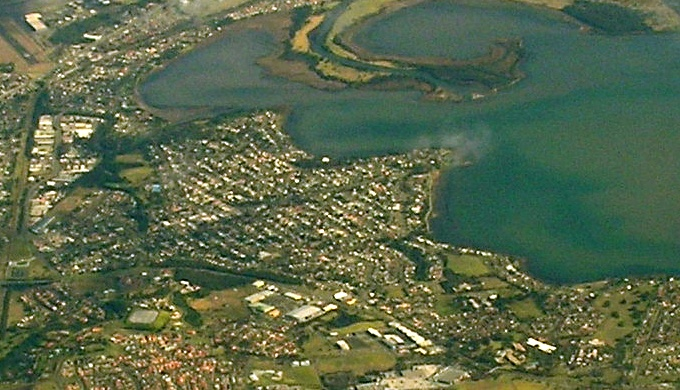
- Aerial view of Oak Flats from the east

- Coordinates: 34°33′43″S 150°49′08″E
- Country: Australia
- State: New South Wales
- Region: Illawarra
- LGA: City of Shellharbour
- Location: 85 km (53 mi) S of Sydney; 21 km (13 mi) S of Wollongong; 15 km (9.3 mi) N of Kiama; 213 km (132 mi) NE of Canberra
- Established: 1831

Government
  - State electorate: Shellharbour
  - Federal division: Whitlam

Area
  - Total: 3.590 km^{2} (1.386 sq mi)
- Elevation: 14 m (46 ft)

Population
  - Total: 6,840 (2021 census)
  - Density: 1,783/km^{2} (4,620/sq mi)
- Time zone: UTC+10 (AEST)
  - Summer (DST): UTC+11 (AEDT)
- Postcode: 2529
- County: Camden
- Parish: Terragong

Oak Flats is a suburb of Shellharbour, New South Wales, Australia situated on the south western shores of Lake Illawarra and within the Illawarra region of New South Wales. It is a residential area, which had a population of 6,840 at the 2021 census.

Oak Flats is one of the 324 suburbs that sits within the Wollongong Statistical District, which covers the local authority areas of Wollongong, Shellharbour and Kiama. Oak Flats is locally governed by the Shellharbour City Council, which governs 22 suburbs within the area.

== History ==
The area was discovered by George Bass and Matthew Flinders in 1796, whilst free settlers arrived in the nearby town of Shellharbour between 1817 and 1831. As the population in the suburbs around Oak Flats grew, the need for more residential areas became more important. The eastern end of the suburb is commonly known as Balarang.

Ownership of area was first as a grant of 1,200 acres (485 hectares) to army officer John Horsley in 1821. The grant was situated on the southern shores of Lake Illawarra and known as the 'Oak Flats Run'. The land was used to run cattle in the area. Development of Oak Flats as a suburb began in 1925 with the Lake Illawarra Township Estate as the centre, followed by the Kembla Vista and Panorama Estates. Economic Depression of the 1930s coupled with the onset of WWII, slowed development. Post WWII migration brought immigrants predominantly Dutch, and German to Oak Flats, and the town began to develop rapidly.

In the early 1930s, Sydney newspapers invited holiday makers to the therapeutic waters of Lake Illawarra as an alternative to spas in the Blue Mountains. Visitors to Oak Flats initially stayed in the two-storey guesthouse on the Boulevarde. Blocks were also purchased and small week-enders erected by visitors keen to return to Lake Illawarra as a holiday destination. A boat shed, where rowing boats could be hired, stood on the end of the small point at Central Park. The shoreline was popular on hot summer days when families would congregate on the grassy banks to rest or swim in the Lake.

Many streets of Oak Flats are named after Australian prime ministers. These include Deakin Street and Barton Street.

Oak Flats was designed by Walter Burley Griffin who also designed Canberra. Similar concepts in the design include that the town centres around a round street (Bridge Ave) like Canberra does Parliament house.

== Demographics ==
Oak Flats is located in southeast New South Wales and had a population of around 6,840 (48.7% male, 51.3% female) at the 2021 census. Around 1,949 families lived in the area and of those 37.5% had one or more children under the age of 15. 20.6% of families had only a single parent while 39.3% of couples had no children. Oak Flats covers an area of approximately 359 hectares (887 acres).

In terms of people aged 15 years or more living in Oak Flats, 44.5% were married, 10.4% were divorced, 4.1% were separated, 6.7% were widowed and 34.4% had never married.

Country of birth	Number	Percentage of total inhabitants
Australia	5,331	77.9%
England	333	4.9%
Germany	90	1.3%
New Zealand	75	1.1%
Scotland	42	0.6%
Italy	42	0.6%

== Geography ==
Oak Flats varies in altitude/elevation from about −4 m (–13.12 ft) (highlight point) to 36 m (118 ft) (highlight point) above sea level.

Neighbouring suburbs/regional areas of Oak Flats include Albion Park Rail, Albion Park, Blackbutt and Mount Warrigal.

== Education ==
Oak Flats has four major schools within its boundaries, including Balarang Primary, Oak Flats Primary School, Oak Flats High School and Corpus Christi Catholic High School.

=== Oak Flats High School ===
Oak Flats High School is a government-funding secondary school, which was opened on a 20-hectare (49-acre) site on the eastern end of the suburb in 1962. It has 760 enrolments and provides education to children between year 7 and year 12.

=== Balarang Public School ===
Balarang Public School was opened in 1968 in a four hectare landscape in Oak Flats. It is located right next to Oak Flats High School. The school provides education to children between Kindergarten and year 6 and draws 30% of its enrolments from other surrounding suburbs. The name of the school is an Indigenous meaning for 'place of swamp oak'.

=== Corpus Christi Catholic High School ===
Corpus Christi Catholic High School is a Catholic co-educational school which opened in 2006 with its first group of Year 7 students. The students are drawn from the parishes extending from Port Kembla in the north to Kiama in the south. Since the opening, Corpus Christi has grown to become a Years 7–12 school.

=== Oak Flats Public School ===
Oak Flats public school is the first school to open in the area of Oak Flats. It provides education and supervision for children between Kindergarten and Year 6. The school also provides pre-school.

== Churches ==
Oak Flats Anglican Church began services in a house in 1947 before moving to the current premises at 35 Fisher Street, Oak Flats, in 1951.

== Transport ==
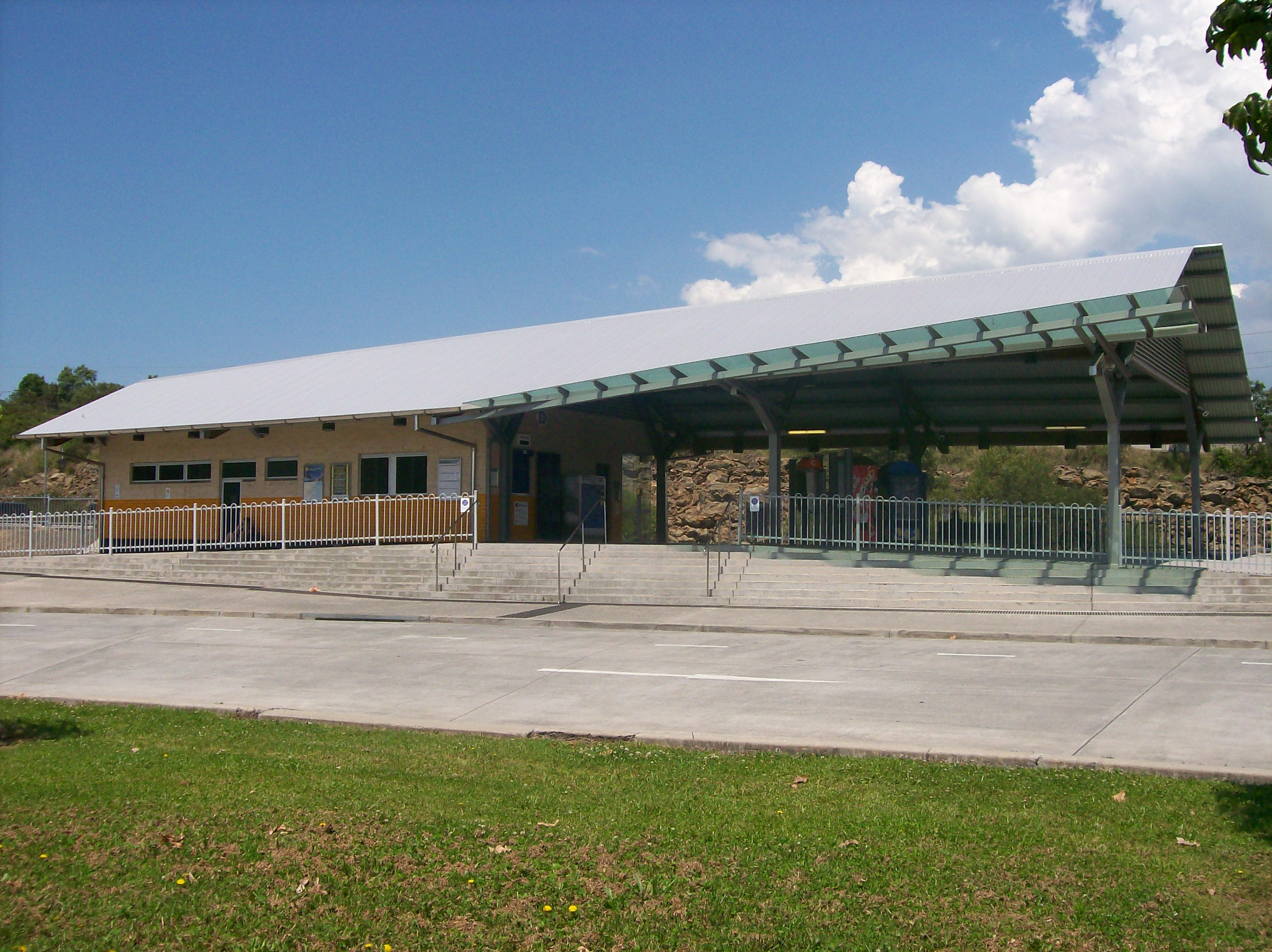
Oak Flats Railway Station

Oak Flats has its own rail station on the NSW TrainLink South Coast line. There is also a bus station/bus stop at the rail station for interchanging with trains.

== Recreation ==
Oak Flats contains two cricket grounds (Shane Lee Oval, Geoff Shaw Oval and Brett Lee Oval), two soccer grounds (Keith Bond Oval and Panorama Oval), and one tennis court.

== Notable people ==
- Cricketers Shane and Brett Lee
