= Shellharbour City Centre =

Shellharbour City Centre Wollongong, New South Wales
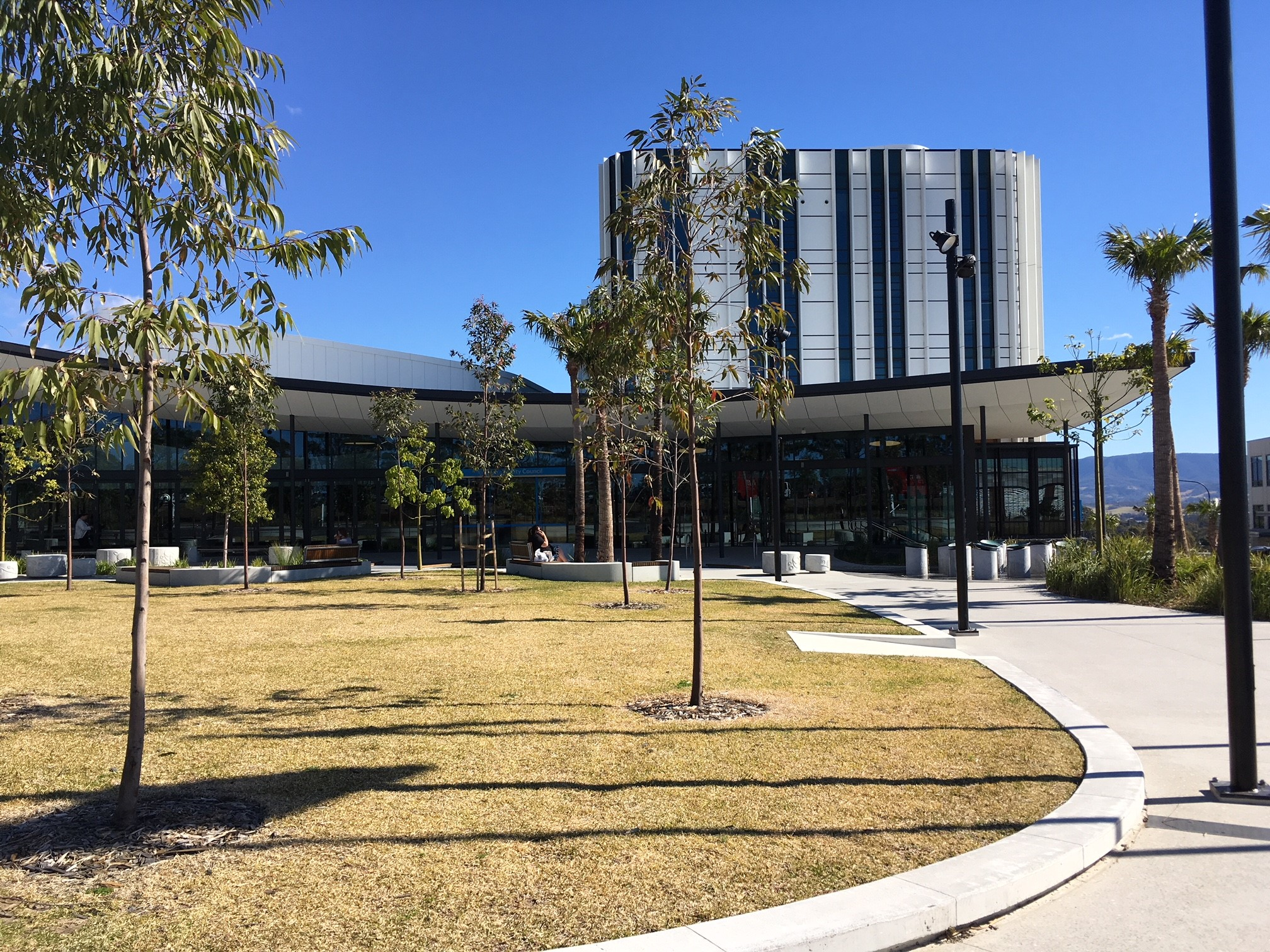
- Shellharbour Civic Centre

- Coordinates: 34°33.8′S 150°50.3′E
- Population: 457 (2021 census)
- Postcode(s): 2529
- LGA(s): City of Shellharbour
- State electorate(s): Shellharbour
- Federal division(s): Whitlam
Suburbs around Shellharbour City Centre:
Oak Flats	Oak Flats	Mount Warrigal
Oak Flats	Shellharbour City Centre	Barrack Heights
Oak Flats	Blackbutt	Blackbutt

Shellharbour City Centre is the central business district of the City of Shellharbour, located in the Illawarra region of New South Wales, Australia (not to be confused with the suburb, Shellharbour). Its name reflects its status as the commercial and administrative centre for the City of Shellharbour local government area, and is home to the Council Administration Centre (located in the Civic Centre), Stockland Shellharbour shopping centre, cinemas and other retail shops. In recent years, apartment buildings have become more common within the district.

The suburb was planned and developed to be the commercial heart of the local government area. The concept was developed in the 1970s by council in conjunction with the New South Wales Department of Planning. Planning and development has since been undertaken by council in partnership with Landcom, in an area of land that was formerly part of Blackbutt.

== Retail ==
Shellharbour City Centre is the shopping destination of Shellharbour City Council with Woolworths, KFC and all in Stockland Shellharbour.
