= Yellow Rock Ridge =

- Suburb
- Coordinates: 34°35′52.8″S 150°43′51.6″E
- Country: Australia
- State: New South Wales
- City: Wollongong
- LGA: City of Shellharbour

Government
  - State electorate: Kiama
  - Federal division: Whitlam
- Postcode: 2527

Yellow Rock Ridge is a suburb of Wollongong in the City of Shellharbour in New South Wales, Australia.

On 1 March 2024 the name was changed from "Yellow Rock" to "Yellow Rock Ridge" to avoid confusion with a village of the same name.

At the 2016 census the population of Yellow Rock Ridge was 206. It had grown to 226 at the 2021 census 226.
