= Dunmore, New South Wales =

Dunmore
- Suburb
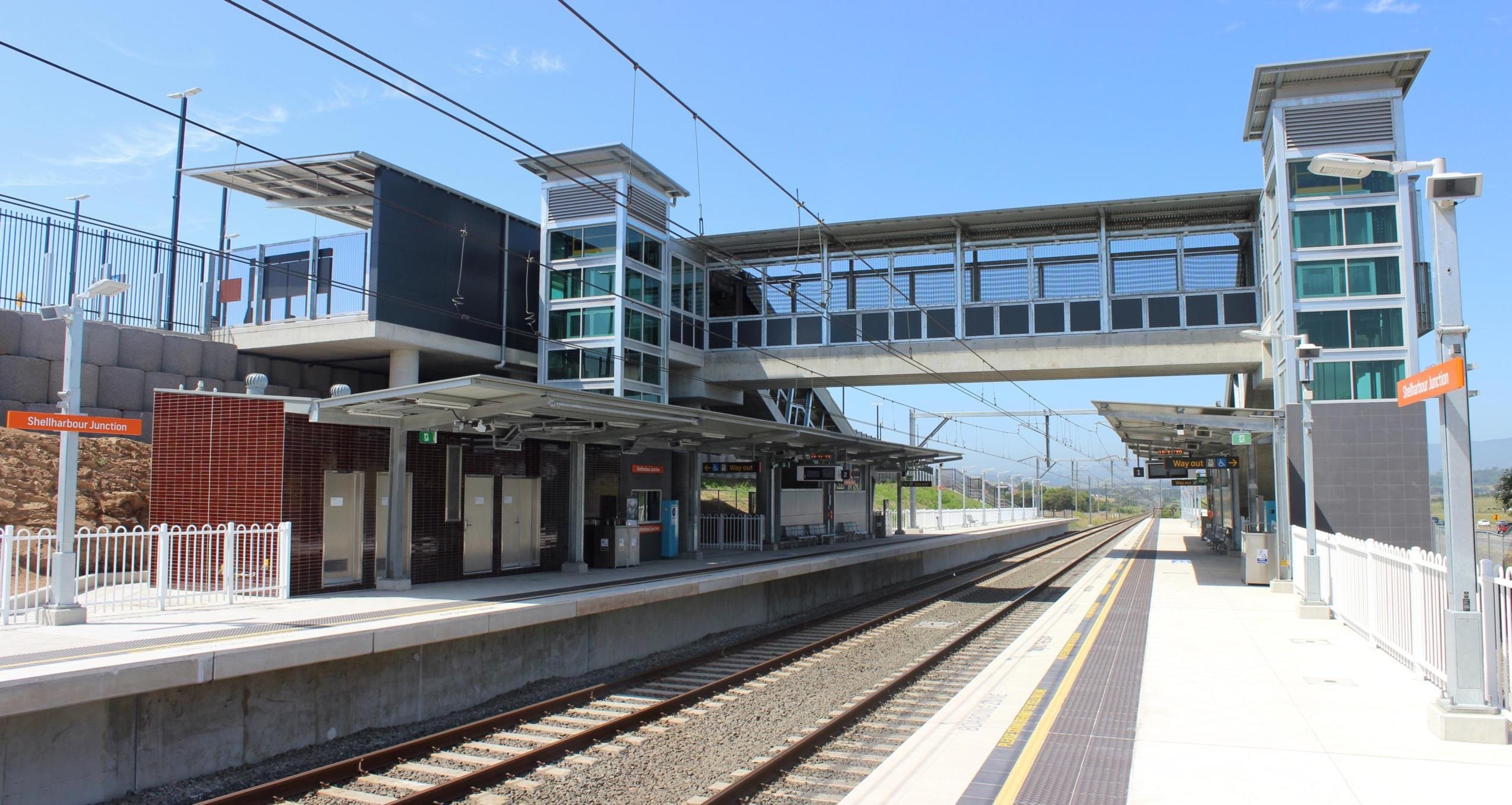
- The new Shellharbour Junction Station in Dunmore

- Interactive map of Dunmore
- Coordinates: 34.62°S 150.83°E
- Country: Australia
- State: New South Wales
- Region: Illawarra
- City: Shellharbour
- LGA: City of Shellharbour
- Location: 114 km (71 mi) SSW of Sydney; 32 km (20 mi) S of Wollongong; 7 km (4.3 mi) NW of Kiama

Government
  - State electorate: Kiama
  - Federal division: Gilmore
- Elevation: 45 m (148 ft)

Population
  - Total: 318 (2021 census)
- Postcode: 2529
- County: Camden
- Parish: Terragong
Suburbs around Dunmore
Croom	Croom	Shell Cove
Jamberoo	Dunmore	Minnamurra
Jamberoo	Kiama Downs	Minnamurra

Dunmore is a largely rural suburb of Shellharbour City in New South Wales, Australia. Dunmore is bisected north to south by the South Coast railway line and the Princes Highway.

== History ==
Much of the present-day City of Shellharbour was originally part of the 13,000-acre Peterborough Estate, granted to discharged convict and colonial politician D'Arcy Wentworth in 1821. In 1865, a 2,560-acre portion of the estate was advertised for sale. The land stretched along the Minnamurra River in the south of the estate, towards Jamberoo. Local shopkeeper George Lawrence Fuller bought the property and named it Dunmore after his birthplace in County Galway, Ireland. (Fuller's son George was to become Premier of New South Wales in 1921.) Fuller père was instrumental in the development of basalt quarrying in the district.

Dunmore came to prominence in 1887 as the location of the railway station serving the seaside village of Shellharbour, five kilometres to the north-east. Indeed, at various times, the station was known as "Shellharbour". The station moved from its original location at Dunmore Road, in the suburb's south, to be closer to the centre of Shellharbour, in 2014. The new station is known as Shellharbour Junction. Dunmore is also home to a Boral basalt quarry, opened c. 1900, and Shellharbour Anglican College, which opened in 2004.

== Heritage listings ==
Dunmore has a number of heritage-listed sites, including:

- Illawarra railway: Dunmore railway station
