= Warilla =

- Suburb
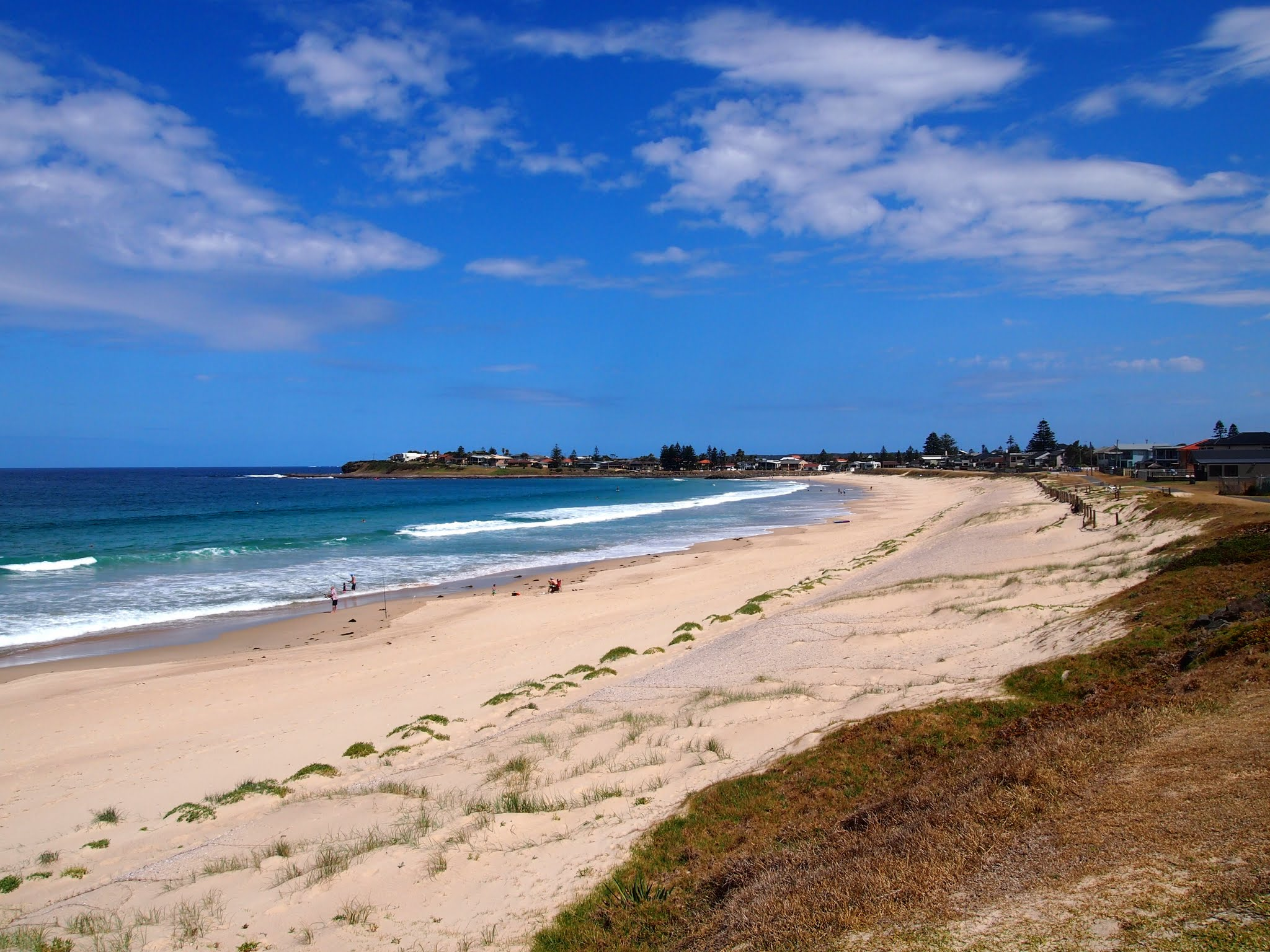
- Warilla Beach

- Coordinates: 34°33′10″S 150°51′42″E
- Country: Australia
- State: New South Wales
- Region: Illawarra
- City: City of Shellharbour
- LGA: City of Shellharbour
- Location: 101 km (63 mi) S of Sydney; 17 km (11 mi) S of Wollongong; 16 km (9.9 mi) N of Kiama
- Established: 1951

Government
  - State electorate: Shellharbour
  - Federal division: Whitlam
- Elevation: 6 m (20 ft)

Population
  - Total: 6,226 (2021)
- Postcode: 2528
- County: Camden
- Parish: Terragong
Suburbs around Warilla
Mount Warrigal	Lake Illawarra	Pacific Ocean
Mount Warrigal	Warilla	Pacific Ocean
Barrack Heights	Barrack Point	Pacific Ocean

Warilla is a seaside suburb of the City of Shellharbour, Australia within the Wollongong urban area. It is one of the more established areas and is between the suburbs of Mount Warrigal in the west, Barrack Heights and Barrack Point in the south and Lake Illawarra in the north.

== History ==
Warilla was officially granted township status in 1951. It is predominantly a residential suburb with many of the houses being built in the 1950s and 1960s. Warilla's main commercial centre is located on George Street with surrounding shops located on Lake Entrance Road and Shellharbour Road, where Warilla Grove Shopping Centre is also situated. There is also a small industrial park located 1 km (0.62 mi) south at Sunset Avenue where light industries are established. Warilla is also blessed with fine beaches which are very popular with locals and tourist especially in summer.

Warilla held the council chambers for Shellharbour City Council from 1969 to 1991 when it relocated to the nearby Shellharbour City Centre. The building, which is still in good condition, is still used for council meetings. Other businesses have also set up inside.

There are two high schools—Lake Illawarra High School and Warilla High School (located in Warilla and Barrack Heights) and two public schools—Warilla North and Warilla Public School.

== Rugby league ==
The Warilla-Lake South Gorillas are the local rugby league club. They are based at Cec Glenholmes Oval in Lake Illawarra and they play in the South Coast Group 7 Rugby League competition.

== Cricket ==
The Warilla Sports Cricket Club is based at Oakley Park and plays in the South Coast District cricket competition.

== Notable people ==
- Alexander Volkanovski, mixed martial artist, current UFC Featherweight Champion.
