= North Macquarie =

- Suburb
- Interactive map of North Macquarie
- Coordinates: 34°33′55″S 150°44′59″E
- Country: Australia
- State: New South Wales
- City: Wollongong
- LGA: City of Shellharbour

Government
  - State electorate: Kiama
  - Federal division: Whitlam

Population
  - Total: 26 (2016 census)
- Postcode: 2527

North Macquarie is a suburb of Wollongong in the City of Shellharbour in New South Wales, Australia, 4 km west of Albion Park.
