= Warilla High School =

Location
- Barrack Heights, Illawarra region, New South Wales; Australia; 34°33′53″S 150°51′27″E

Information
- Type: Government-funded co-educational comprehensive secondary day school
- Motto: Student Centred, Outcomes Driven.
- Established: 1965; 61 years ago
- School district: Wollongong
- Educational authority: New South Wales Department of Education
- Principal: Jennifer Lawrence
- Teaching staff: 91.1 FTE (2018)
- Years: 7–12
- Enrolment: 1,255 (2018)
- Campus: Suburban
- Colours: White and blue
- Website: warilla-h.schools.nsw.gov.au

Warilla High School is a government-funded co-educational comprehensive secondary day school, located in Barrack Heights, a suburb of the City of Shellharbour, in the Illawarra region of New South Wales, Australia.

Established in 1965, the school caters for approximately 1,250 students in 2018, from Year 7 to Year 12, of whom eight percent identified as Indigenous Australians and 16 percent were from a language background other than English. The school is operated by the NSW Department of Education.

== Overview ==
The school is located in the suburb of Barrack Heights and there were suggestions of renaming the school to reflect the change in primary feeder schools (Flinders Public School, Warilla Public School, Shellharbour Public School, and Barrack Heights Public School). In early to late 2009 Warilla High underwent a major reconstruction with the funding of six new Science Labs. The school celebrated its 50th anniversary in 2015.

As of 2010 Warilla High School had an enrolment of over 1,200 students making it one of the largest high schools in the region.

== Principals ==
The following individuals has served as principal of Warilla High School.

Ordinal	Officeholder	Term start	Term end	Time in office	Notes
1	Gordon Dunbar Brown	1966	1972	5–6 years	
2	William John Leyshon	1973	1978	4–5 years	
3	Maxwel Matthew Weir Cooper	1979	1983	3–4 years	
4	Desmond John Murphy	1984	1990	5–6 years	
5	Alan John Petersen	1991	2003	11–12 years	
6	John Hambly	2004	2008	3–4 years	
7	Glen Isemonger	2009	2011	1–2 years	
8	Jeff Jacobs	2012	2012	0 years	
9	John Hambly	2012	2020	13–14 years	
10	Michelle Brook	2020	2025	4 years	
11	Jennifer Lawrence	2025	2026*	1 year	*Relieving Principal, scheduled until 2026, TBD.

== Alumni ==
- Luke Bailey – rugby league player
- Telaya Blacksmith – paralympian
- Jye Edwards – middle distance runner
- Kane Linnett – rugby league player
- James Tedesco – rugby league player
- Shakiah Tungai – rugby league player

== See also ==
- List of government schools in New South Wales: Q–Z
- List of schools in Illawarra and the South East
- Education in Australia
