= Jye Edwards =

Australian athlete

Personal information
- Born: 6 March 1998 (age 27)

Sport
- Sport: Track and Field
- Event: 1500 metres

Jye Edwards (born 6 March 1998) is an Australian middle-distance runner. Edwards competed at the Tokyo 2020 Olympic Games. He came seventh in his Men's 1500m heat with a time of 3:42.62 and was therefore eliminated.

== Early years ==
Edwards began competing in athletics when he was 6-years-old. He was encouraged to do so along with his three siblings at Albion Park Little Athletics Club, Shellharbour, New South Wales. He was a keen cricketer, but found that he was a very good runner and joined Bankstown Sports Athletics Club in Sydney.

Edwards is a former student at Warilla High School, in New South Wales and is coached by Dick Telford.

== Achievements ==
In February 2017, he recorded the seventh-fastest 1500 metres time in Australian history at the NSW Juniors Sydney Invitational in a time of 3:41.69. Then a torn achilles, a knee issue and stress fracture to his right femur blunted Jye's career but in 2019 a second place at the New South Wales Cross Country Championships at Willandra in the open men's section displayed his return towards fitness.

Edwards ran a 7:56 3000 metres personal best in Sydney in November 2020 and then ran a 3:57 mile personal best a month later. On 18 April 2021, Edwards won gold in a time of 3:33.99 seconds at the Sydney Olympic Park to win the 1500 metres at the Australian National Athletics Championships and secure the Olympic qualifying standard for the delayed 2020 Summer Games in Tokyo. Running at the Olympics in Tokyo he finished seventh in his heat.
