= Blackbutt, New South Wales =

Blackbutt Shellharbour, New South Wales
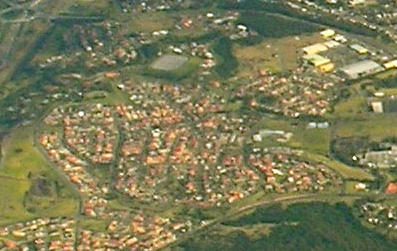
- Aerial view from the east.

- Coordinates: 34°34.3′S 150°50.3′E
- Population: 3,291 (2021 census)
- Postcode(s): 2529
- LGA(s): City of Shellharbour
- Region: Illawarra
- County: Camden
- Parish: Terragong
- State electorate(s): Shellharbour
- Federal division(s): Whitlam
Suburbs around Blackbutt:
Shellharbour City Centre	Barrack Heights	Shellharbour
Oak Flats	Blackbutt	Shellharbour
Croom	Flinders	Shellharbour

Blackbutt is a southern suburb of Shellharbour, New South Wales, Australia. The eastern half of the suburb is occupied by the Blackbutt Forest Reserve. The suburb was named after the blackbutt tree, Eucalyptus pilularis.
