= Kane Linnett =

Scotland international rugby league footballer

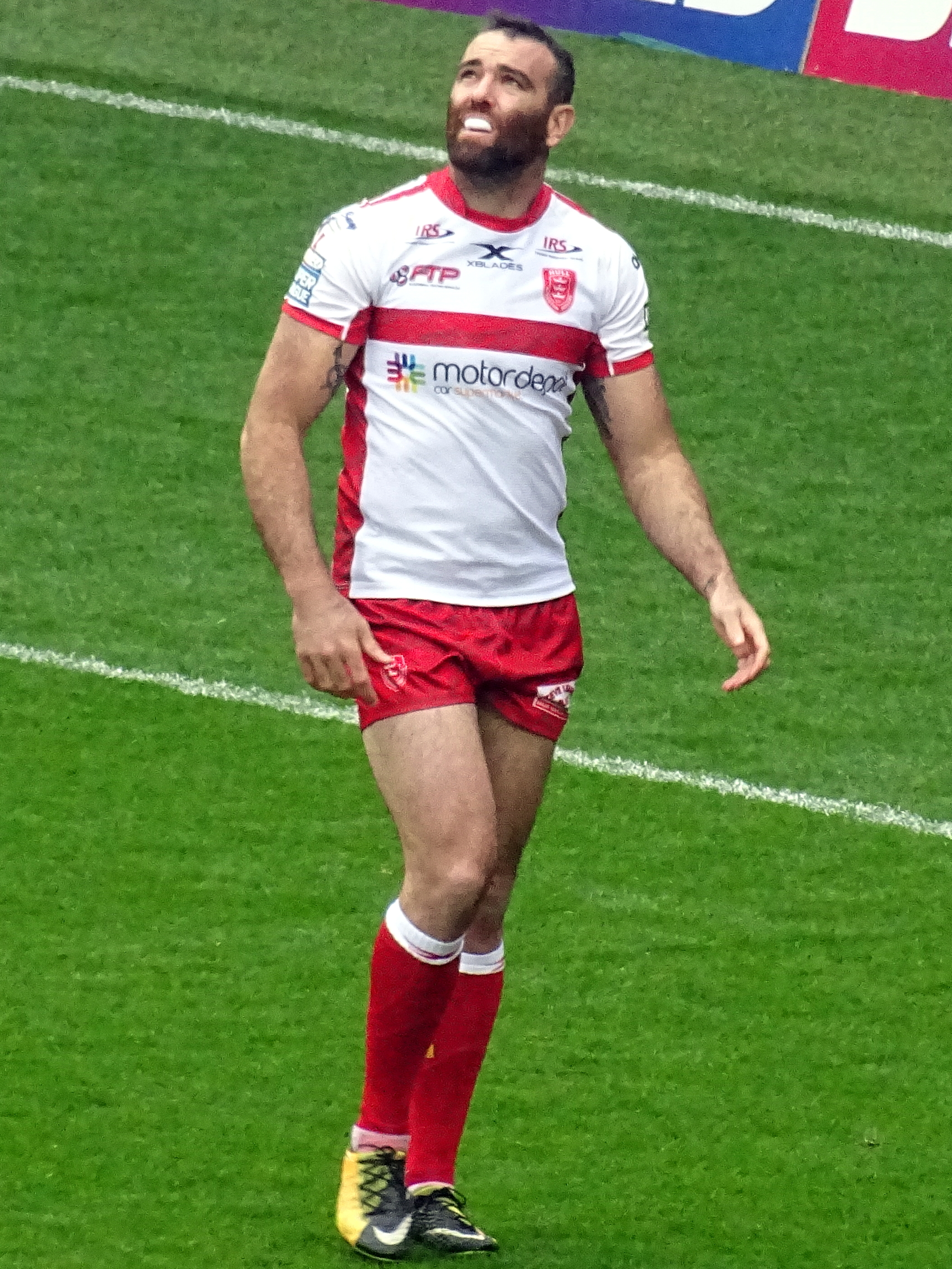

Personal information
- Full name: Kane Linnett
- Born: 11 January 1989 (age 37) Shellharbour, New South Wales, Australia
- Height: 6 ft 4 in (1.94 m)
- Weight: 16 st 7 lb (105 kg)

Playing information
- Position: Centre, Second-row
Club
Years	Team	Pld	T	G	FG	P
2010–11	Sydney Roosters	23	4	0	0	16
2012–18	North Qld Cowboys	164	53	0	0	228
2019–23	Hull Kingston Rovers	110	39	0	0	116
	Total	297	96	0	0	360
Representative
Years	Team	Pld	T	G	FG	P
2013–23	Scotland	9	2	0	0	8
2016	Country Origin	1	0	0	0	0
- Source: As of 6 November 2023

Kane Linnett (born 11 January 1989) is a former Scotland international rugby league footballer, who plays as a centre or second-row forward for Sarina Crocodiles in the Mackay & District Rugby League.

He has previously played for the Sydney Roosters and the North Queensland Cowboys in the NRL. Linnett was a member of the Cowboys' 2015 NRL Premiership and 2016 World Club Challenge winning sides.

On 6 November 2023, Linett announced his retirement with immediate effect.

== Background ==
Linnett was born in Shellharbour, New South Wales, Australia.

He grew up in Barrack Heights, a suburb of Shellharbour.

He attended Warilla High School and played junior football for both the Port Kembla Blacks and Windang Pelicans. While at high school, Linnett was a promising rugby union player, representing New South Wales Country High Schools, but ultimately decided to stick with rugby league.

== Playing career ==
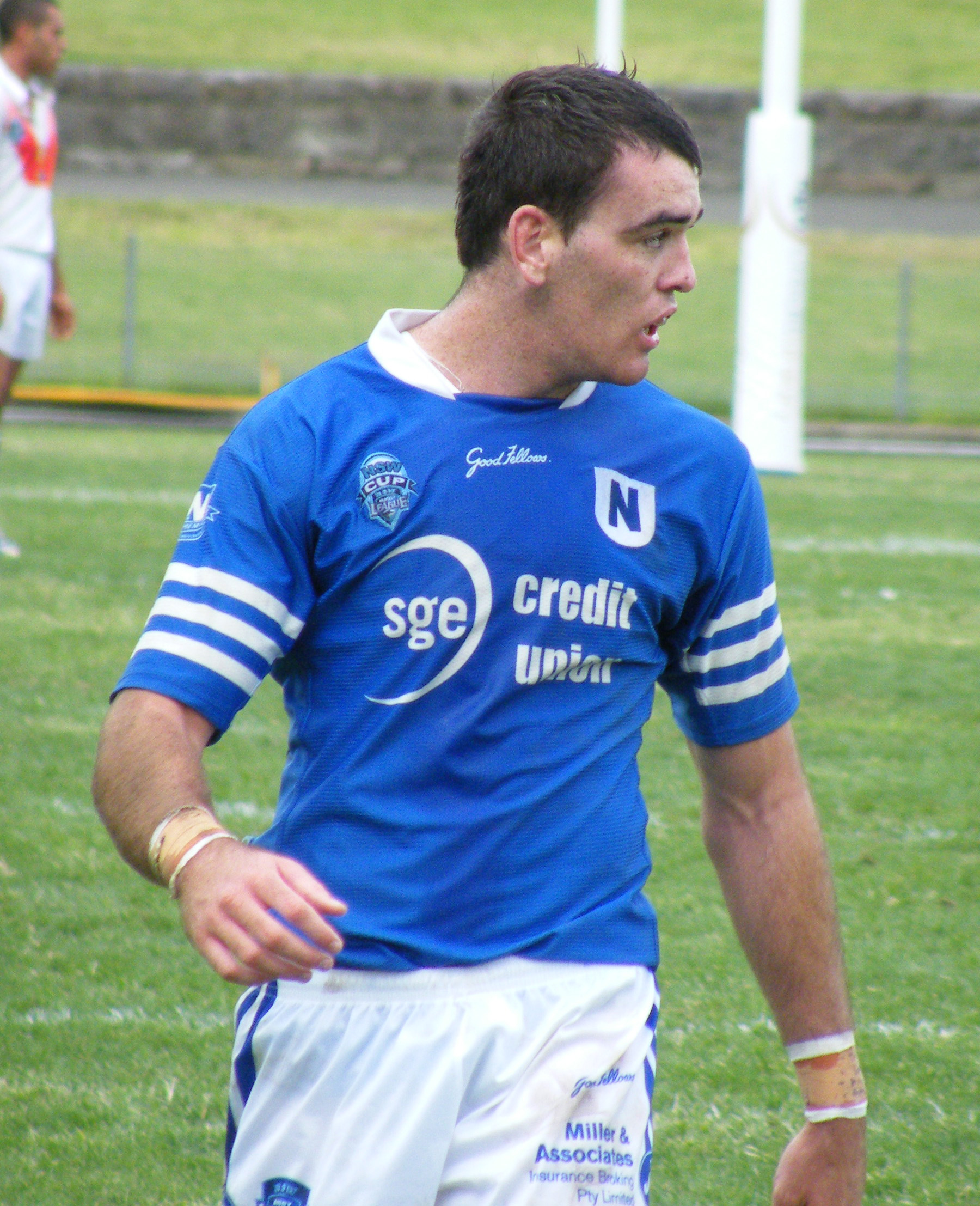
Linnett playing for the Newtown Jets

=== Early career ===
In 2007, Linnett played for the Illawarra Steelers in the SG Ball Cup, earning a contract with St. George Illawarra.

Linnett played with the St. George Illawarra NYC side between 2008 and 2009, scoring 31 tries in 51 games, before joining the Sydney Roosters.

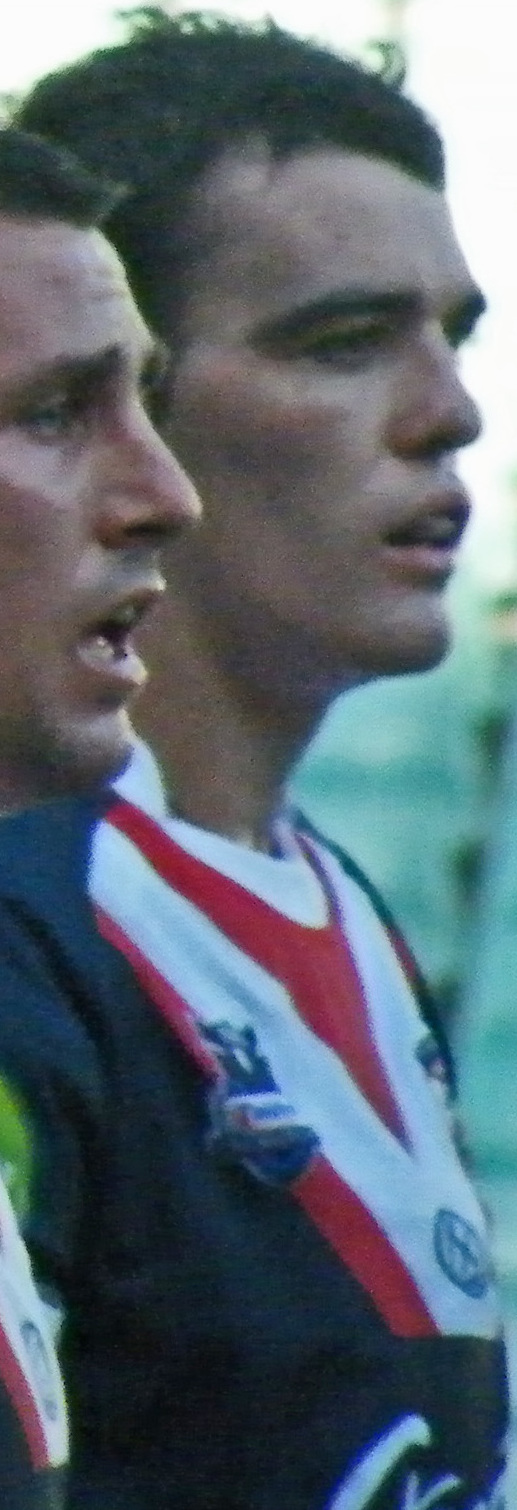
Linnett playing for the Sydney Roosters

== Sydney Roosters (2010–11) ==
Linnett made his National Rugby League début in round 14 of the 2010 NRL season. He ran for over 200m and scored a try in the Sydney Roosters' 38–6 win over Melbourne.

He finished the season as a member of the Sydney Roosters 2010 NRL Grand Final team that lost to his former club, St. George Illawarra, by a score of 32–8.

In 2011, Linnett was limited to just 10 NRL games. In round 23, he played on through a season-ending knee injury, scoring a try in the Sydney Roosters' 20–12 victory over the St. George Illawarra.

On 3 August 2011, he signed a two-year contract with North Queensland.

== North Queensland Cowboys (2012–18) ==
Linnett scored his first try for the North Queensland in the side's round 3 match against Parramatta.

Two weeks later, in the North Queensland Cowboys round 5 win against the Canberra Raiders, Linnett set a club record for most metres by a North Queensland Cowboys centre, with 234.

He was named the North Queensland Cowboys' 'Most Improved' for 2012, at the club's annual presentation ball.

In 2013, Linnett played in every single game for the North Queensland club scoring 9 tries.

At the end of the 2013 season, Linnett represented Scotland at the 2013 Rugby League World Cup, qualifying to play for them through his mother.

On 11 February 2014, Linnett re-signed with the North Queensland Cowboys for a further two seasons.

Later that month, Linnett was a part of the North Queensland club's victorious Auckland Nines team and was subsequently named in the 'Team of the Tournament.

In round 3 of the 2015 NRL season, Linnett played his 100th NRL game.

On 4 October 2015, he was a member of the North Queensland Grand Final winning side, starting a centre in the side's dramatic 17–16 victory over the Brisbane Broncos.

On 21 February 2016, Linnett was a member of the North Queensland World Club Challenge winning side, starting the game at centre in the side's 38–4 victory over Leeds at Headingley Stadium.

In May 2016, Linnett represented his Country Origin for the first time.

In October 2016, Linnett was named in Scotland's 2016 Four Nations squad.

In round 3 of the 2017 NRL season, Linnett played his 150th NRL game in North Queensland club's 30–8 loss to the Manly-Warringah Sea Eagles.

In North Queensland's semi-final win over Parramatta, Linnett played his 150th game for the club.

On 1 October 2017, he started at centre in the North Queensland Cowboys' 2017 NRL Grand Final loss to Melbourne.

Linnett played in all 28 games for the club in 2017, scoring five tries.

Linnett made 12 appearances for the North Queensland Cowboys in 2018, as the club struggled towards the bottom of the ladder for the entire season but won their final two games to avoid the wooden spoon.

In September 2018, it was revealed that Linnett was one of several North Queensland Cowboys' players told that they would not be offered a contract for the 2019 season.

== Hull Kingston Rovers (2019 – 2023) ==
On 14 November 2018, Linnett signed a three-year deal with Super League club, Hull Kingston Rovers.

On 9 January 2019, Linnett received the number 23 jersey ahead of the start of the Super League season.

On 13 January 2019, Linnett made his non-competitive Hull Kingston Rovers' début in a try scoring pre-season friendly against the Widnes Vikings, Linnett claimed a 30–16 victory with his new club.

Linnett made his first competitive appearance for Hull Kingston Rovers in round 1 of the 2019 Super League season, Linnett who started the game in the second-row recorded a thrilling 18-16 victory over cross-city rivals Hull F.C. at Craven Park.

On 17 February 2019, in round 3 in a game against the London Broncos, Linnett scored his first try in the Super League.

In round 4 of the 2021 Super League season, he scored a hat-trick in Hull KR's 26-6 victory over Leeds.

In round 8 of the 2021 Super League season, Linnett scores two tries for Hull KR in a 40-16 victory over Leigh. Linnett made a total of 20 appearances for Hull KR in the 2021 Super League season including the club's 28-10 semi-final loss against the Catalans Dragons. On 12 August 2023, Linnett played for Hull Kingston Rovers in their 17-16 golden point extra-time loss to Leigh in the Challenge Cup final. In round 23 of the 2023 Super League season, Linnett scored two tries for Hull Kingston Rovers in their 52-10 victory over Leigh in the Challenge Cup final rematch.

Linnett played 24 games for Hull Kingston Rovers in the 2023 Super League season as the club finished fourth on the table and qualified for the playoffs. He played in the clubs semi-final loss against Wigan. On 6 November 2023, Linnett announced his retirement from rugby league.

== Honours ==
=== Club (North Queensland Cowboys 2012–18) ===
- North Queensland Cowboys Most Improved: 2012
- 2014 NRL Auckland Nines: 2014 'Team of the Tournament'

=== Club (North Queensland Cowboys 2012–18) ===
- 2014 NRL Auckland Nines: North Queensland Cowboys – Winner
- 2015 NRL Grand Final: North Queensland Cowboys – Winners
- 2016 World Club Challenge: North Queensland Cowboys – Winners

== Statistics ==
Stats correct as of 2 August 2024.

†	Denotes seasons in which Linnett won an NRL Premiership

Season	Team	Matches	T	G	GK %	F/G	Pts=
2010	Sydney Roosters	13	2	0	—	0	8
2011	Sydney Roosters	10	2	0	—	0	8
2012	North Queensland	24	12	0	—	0	48
2013	North Queensland	25	9	0	—	0	36
2014	North Queensland	25	12	0	—	0	48
2015†	North Queensland	28	10	0	—	0	40
2016	North Queensland	22	5	0	—	0	20
2017	North Queensland	28	5	0	—	0	20
2018	North Queensland	12	0	0	—	0	0
2019	Hull Kingston Rovers	27	10	0	—	0	40
2020	Hull Kingston Rovers	17	2	0	—	0	8
2021	Hull Kingston Rovers	23	13	0	—	0	52
2022	Hull Kingston Rovers	15	4	0	—	0	48
2023	Hull Kingston Rovers	28	12	0	—	0	48
	Totals	297	96	0	—	0	360

=== International (2013–22) ===
Season	Team	Matches	T	G	GK %	F/G	Pts=
2013	Scotland	3	1	0	—	0	4
2016	Scotland	3	1	0	—	0	4
2022	Scotland	3					
Career totals		9	2	0	—	0	8
