= Shell Cove =

- Suburb
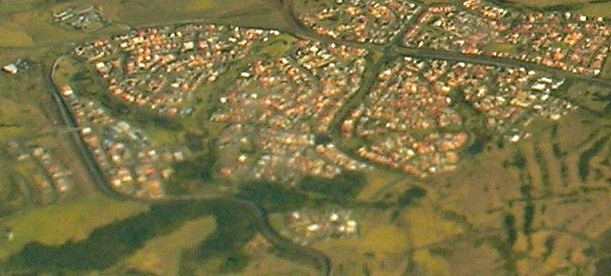
- Aerial view from the east

- Interactive map of Shell Cove
- Coordinates: 34°35.4′S 150°51.7′E
- Country: Australia
- State: New South Wales
- Region: Illawarra
- City: Shellharbour
- LGA: City of Shellharbour

Government
  - State electorate: Shellharbour
  - Federal division: Gilmore

Population
  - Total: 7,591 (2021 census)
- Postcode: 2529
- County: Camden
- Parish: Terragong
Suburbs around Shell Cove
Flinders	Shellharbour
Dunmore	Shell Cove
Dunmore	Minnamurra

Shell Cove is an affluent seaside suburb in the Shellharbour area located just south of Wollongong, New South Wales, Australia. Shell Cove adjoins Bass Point and Killalea State Park.

Shell cove includes a Golf Course, Shopping Centre, Hotel, Beaches, and mixed density housing.

It contains Bass Point Reserve, a heritage-listed site.
