= Croom, New South Wales =

Croom
- Suburb
- Interactive map of Croom
- Coordinates: 34°35′06″S 150°48′31″E
- Country: Australia
- State: New South Wales
- Region: Illawarra
- City: Wollongong
- LGA: City of Shellharbour
- Location: 111 km (69 mi) SSW of Sydney; 29 km (18 mi) S of Wollongong; 11 km (6.8 mi) NW of Kiama; 53 km (33 mi) E of Moss Vale

Government
  - State electorate: Kiama
  - Federal divisions: Gilmore; Whitlam
- Elevation: 15 m (49 ft)

Population
  - Total: 112 (2021 census)
- Postcode: 2527
- County: Camden
- Parish: Terragong
Suburbs around Croom
Albion Park	Albion Pk Rail	Flinders
Albion Park	Croom	Dunmore
Dunmore	Dunmore	Dunmore

Croom is a rural locality of Wollongong in New South Wales, Australia, part of the state suburb of Dunmore. The name has been variously spelled Croomb, Croom and Croome. The locality shares its name with the village of Croom in County Limerick, Ireland – derived from the Irish cromadh, meaning bend.

The 1,280-acre Croom estate was granted to Isabella Croker in 1839. The following year, Croker sold it to newly arrived settler Ebenezer Russell. Russell cleared the land and established a homestead, stables, dairy and mill that survive to this day. Russell became prominent within the district, and served as a foundation member of Shellharbour Municipal Council.

Today, Croom is principally farmland. The north-west corner of the locality is occupied by the City of Shellharbour's Croom Sporting Complex and Shellharbour City Stadium. Croom is also host to a section of the Princes Highway Albion Park Rail bypass.
