= Barrack Point =

Barrack Point Illawarra, New South Wales
- Coordinates: 34°33′42″S 150°51′57″E
- Population: 725 (2021 census)
- Postcode(s): 2528
- LGA(s): City of Shellharbour
- Region: Illawarra
- County: Camden
- Parish: Terragong
- State electorate(s): Shellharbour
- Federal division(s): Whitlam
Suburbs around Barrack Point:
Warilla	Warilla	Pacific Ocean
Barrack Heights	Barrack Point	Pacific Ocean
Blackbutt	Shellharbour	Pacific Ocean

Barrack Point is a seaside suburb of the City of Shellharbour, New South Wales, Australia which sits within the southern Wollongong urban area. Surrounding suburbs are Warilla to the north, Barrack Heights to the west, and Shellharbour to the south.

The Surfrider Caravan Park is found here opposite Shellharbour Beach.
