= Lake Illawarra, New South Wales =

Lake Illawarra Shellharbour, New South Wales
- Coordinates: 34°32′30″S 150°51′30″E
- Population: 3,288 (2021 census)
- Postcode(s): 2528
- Elevation: 9 m (30 ft)
- Location: 100 km (62 mi) S of Sydney; 14 km (9 mi) S of Wollongong; 20 km (12 mi) N of Kiama
- LGA(s): City of Shellharbour
- Region: Illawarra
- County: Camden
- Parish: Terragong
- State electorate(s): Shellharbour
- Federal division(s): Whitlam
Suburbs around Lake Illawarra:
Lake Illawarra	Windang	Pacific Ocean
Mount Warrigal	Lake Illawarra	Pacific Ocean
Warilla	Warilla	Pacific Ocean

Lake Illawarra is a suburb of Shellharbour, New South Wales, Australia located on the southern side of the Lake Illawarra entrance. Average annual precipitation is 1,352 millimetres. The rainiest month is February, with an average of 211 mm of precipitation, and the driest is July, with 36 mm of precipitation.

== See also ==
- Lake Illawarra High School
