= Stockland Shellharbour =

- Location: Shellharbour City Centre, New South Wales, Australia
- Coordinates: 34°33′52″S 150°50′20″E
- Address: 211 Lake Entrance Rd, Shellharbour City Centre NSW 2529
- Opened: November 1982; 44 years ago
- Previous names: Shellharbour Square (1982 - 2003)
- Developer: Girvan Corporation Ltd
- Manager: Stockland
- Owner: Stockland
- Num. of stores: 228
- Num. of anchor tenants: 6
- Floor area: 81,880 m^{2} (881,349 sq ft)
- Floors: 3
- Parking: 3,607 spaces
- Public transit: Oak Flats; Lake Entrance Road
- Website: www.stockland.com.au/shopping-centres/centres/stockland-shellharbour

Stockland Shellharbour (previously known as Shellharbour Square) is a large indoor/outdoor shopping centre in the Shellharbour City Centre of the Illawarra region.

== Transport ==
The South Coast railway line offer frequent services to Oak Flats station which is approximately a 34 minute walk or a 4 minute drive from Stockland Shellharbour.

Stockland Shellharbour has bus connections to Barrack Point, Oak Flats, Unanderra and Wollongong, as well as the local surrounding area. The bus stop is located at the front of the centre adjacent to the taxi rank which run parallel to Lake Entrance Road.

Stockland Shellharbour has multi-level car parks with 3,607 spaces.

== History ==
=== 20th Century ===
==== 1980s: opening ====
Shellharbour Square opened in November 1982 and featured Kmart, Coles New World, Franklins, Best & Less, W. Waters and Son hardwares and 96 speciality stores. The centre has 28,222m² of retail space and 2000 car spaces. It was owned by Girvan Corporation Ltd who purchased and developed the centre on former public housing land.

Shellharbour Square was listed for sale in September 1988 and on 11 November 1988 GIO Insurance acquired Shellharbour Square for $63 million.

==== 1990s: redevelopment ====
Shellharbour Square began work on the $45 million redevelopment in April 1997 which increased the total retail floor area to 39,760m². This development saw the addition of a Target discount department store, a new Franklins Big Fresh supermarket, a fresh food market, 300-seat food court and around 40 specialty stores in 1998.

=== 21st Century ===
==== 2000s ====
In 2002 Franklins closed its store and was taken over by Bi-Lo. That same year the W. Waters and Son hardwares store closed and was replaced by Allens Stores.

In 2004 Allens Stores was acquired by Harris Scarfe which was then rebranded in 2008 to Harris Scarfe.

In June 2003, Stockland acquired Shellharbour Square and the centre was renamed Stockland Shellharbour.

==== 2010s ====
In December 2010 Stockland commenced construction on the $330 million redevelopment of Stockland Shellharbour. The redevelopment involved the expansion and partial demolition of the centre. The expansion doubled the size of the centre and involved the relocation of Coles and Kmart. Harris Scarfe closed down on 9th February 2013 to make way for this development. This development included the addition of a new city square, new plaza entrance on vacant land to the southwest of existing centre, alfresco dining precinct, community stage, child play areas and a multi-function space used for passive recreation and small community activities.

The first stage of the $330 million redevelopment opened on 10 July 2012 with the opening of a newly relocated Kmart, Coles and 43 specialty stores.

Stockland Shellharbour had its grand opening on 18th May 2013. This included the opening of a new city square featuring an alfresco dining precinct known as The Avenue and an expanded fresh food market. The two level Myer department store opened on 11th May 2013 by Australian model Jennifer Hawkins and Myer CEO Bernie Brookes. New stores opened included Harris Scarfe, Woolworths, JB Hi-Fi and a new relocated Coles and Kmart, bringing the total number of stores to around 220.

==== 2020s ====
On 6 May 2021, Timezone opened its venue on level one which features Spin Zone bumper cars, Virtual Reality and arcade games.

In February 2025 upgrade works began on the Shellharbour Civic Plaza next to Stockland Shellharbour. The works included an installation of a new customer lift, paver rectification, general beautification and awning works which were completed by June 2025.

== Tenants ==
Stockland Shellharbour has 81,880m^{2} of floor space. The major retailers include Myer, Harris Scarfe, Kmart, Target, Coles, Woolworths, Cotton On, JB Hi-Fi and Timezone.
