= Dunmore railway station =

Historic site in New South Wales, Australia

Dunmore (Shellharbour)
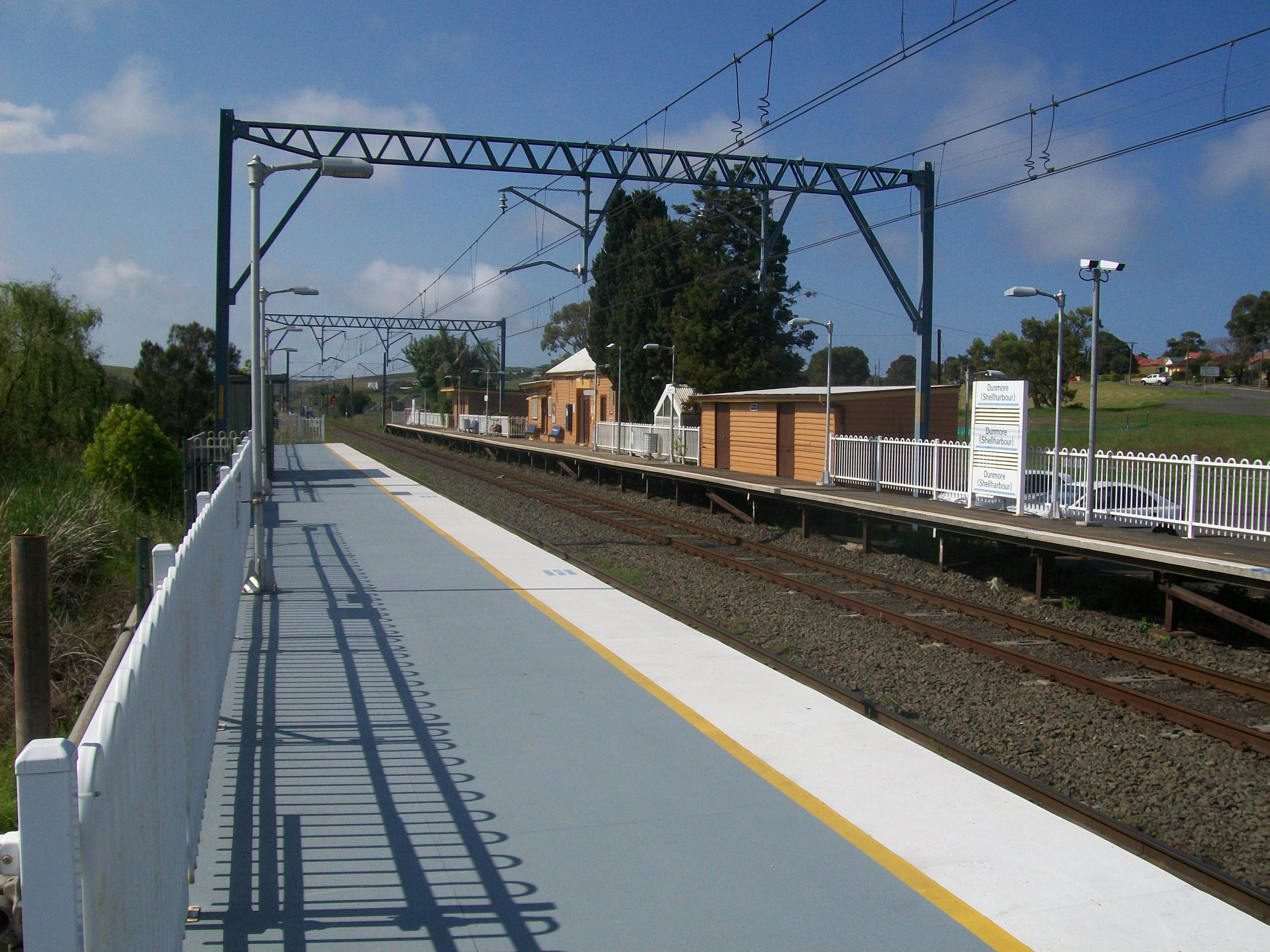
- Northbound view from Platform 1

General information
- Location: Dunmore Road, Dunmore; Australia
- Coordinates: 34°36′22″S 150°50′24″E
- Elevation: 29 metres (95 ft)
- Owner: Transport Asset Manager of New South Wales
- Line: South Coast railway line
- Distance: 110.66 km (68.76 mi) from Central
- Platforms: 2 side
- Tracks: 2

Construction
- Structure type: Ground

Other information
- Website: Sydney Trains

History
- Opened: 9 November 1887
- Closed: 21 November 2014

Passengers
- 2013: 30 (daily) (Sydney Trains, NSW TrainLink)
- Rank: 274

New South Wales Heritage Register
- Official name: Shellharbour Railway Station Group; Dunmore Railway Station
- Type: State heritage (complex / group)
- Designated: 2 April 1999
- Reference no.: 1245
- Type: Railway Platform / Station
- Category: Transport – Rail
Location

Dunmore railway station is a heritage-listed disused railway station located on the South Coast railway line in Dunmore, New South Wales, Australia. The station served the southern Wollongong suburb of Dunmore and indirectly Shellharbour and opened on 9 November 1887. The weatherboard station on Platform 2 dates from 1887. It is also known as the Shellharbour Railway Station Group, Shellharbour railway station and Dunmore Railway Station. The property was added to the New South Wales State Heritage Register on 2 April 1999.

As part of the electrification of the line to Kiama in 2001, the existing crossing loop was extended north and received a platform, albeit built out of scaffolding materials with most trains continuing to use the original platform. The loop also provides access to Boral's Dunmore Quarry. There was previously a level crossing immediately south of the station. This was closed in the late-2000s as part of improvement works to the adjacent Princes Highway.

== History ==
The township of Shellharbour was laid out in 1851 around the port of Shellharbour, on the Peterborough Estate. Shellharbour (Municipal) Council was constituted on 4 June 1859 and the chambers, built in 1865 was located in Addison Street, Shellharbour. Dunmore had a post office in 1890. The council relocated to Albion Park in 1897, coinciding with the decline of Shellharbour (Village) and the growth of Albion Park as a lucrative beef and dairy cattle district.

The Illawarra railway line from Wollongong to Scarborough was opened as an isolated line on 21 June 1887 with an extension to Bombo (North Kiama) from Wollongong opened on 9 November 1887. Finally on 3 October 1888 the connection to the northern Sydney section was made. An extension of the line from Bombo south to Bomaderry was completed in 1893.

Dunmore (Shellharbour) Railway Station was in the section of the line opened in November 1887. The awningless Platform 2 building is original (1887), the Out-of-room (aka old milk shed) was constructed in 1891 and extended in 1908. The signal box was constructed in 1925.

The 1887 Dunmore (Shellharbour) Station Master's residence is a relatively early brick example of the J2 design Station Master's residence, having been constructed in 1887 prior to the issue of the series of standard plans by the office of Henry Deane, Engineer-in-Chief for Railways Construction 1891–1901, for these buildings in 1899. Though Henry Deane was acting in this position from 1889 after the retirement of John Whitton, due to the 1887 construction date of this Station Master's residence, association of the design with Henry Deane is uncertain.

Plans dated 1907 show the railway station with (from south to north) a Gatekeeper's cottage (no longer extant) at the Shellharbour Road level crossing; platform with ramps at each end and a ramp north of the platform building; a milk shed; platform building with water tank at south end; lamp room and separate WC (toilet) building; cattle yards to the northeast of the platform building; and the Station Master's residence with underground water tank to the northeast of the station.

In 1923 a small line was linked to the main line at Dunmore (Shellharbour) Station to allow the blue metal quarry at Dunmore (which had operated since at least c. 1905) to access the rail network. The extra rail traffic generated by this may have given rise to the 1925 refurbishment plans which led to the construction of the signal box and the refurbishment of the 1887 platform building to provide a ladies' waiting room at the southern end; refurbished central waiting area in the centre (marked on plans as "waiting shed" indicating its open nature); a refurbished room at the northern end of the building for multiple use as Station Master's office, booking office and parcels office; and an awning roof to connect the Station Master's office etc. to a doorway into the new 1925 signal box at the southern end of the platform building. Plans dating from 1929 also show proposed additions to the Gatehouse.

Plans dated 1940 with later notations show the station in a similar form to those of 1907, however with the platform extended (notation on platform "Earth filled – Sleeper face – Timber top"); an enlarged milk shed; the earlier WC crossed out (indicating its demolition); the stockyards noted as "recovered 1968" (demolished); and a new ramp to the northeast of the platform building marked "Pioneer Concrete Pty Ltd Siding No. 2 40' ramp".

Plans dated 1970 show the Gatekeeper's cottage no longer extant; the goods siding clearly shown to the east of the platform and platform buildings, with an unloading platform and shed adjacent to the west of the siding; and a gent's toilet at the northern end of the platform. At this time the platform building is shown with two water tanks (one at the southern end, one between the signal box and the platform building) with an internal plan showing (north to south): parcels office, waiting room and ladies toilet.

The goods siding and associated structures have all been removed since 1970.

Dunmore station closed on 21 November 2014, being replaced by Shellharbour Junction station, located 800 metres (2,600 ft) to the north.

== Platforms and services ==
Dunmore had two side platforms. It was serviced by NSW TrainLink South Coast line services travelling between Sydney Central, Bondi Junction and Kiama.

Platform	Line	Stopping pattern	Notes
1	SCO	services to Sydney Central, Bondi Junction & Kiama	

== Heritage listing ==
As at 23 November 2010, The Dunmore (Shellharbour) Railway Station and residence is of state historical significance for its rare awningless 1887 platform building (only 2 other examples on the Illawarra line), 1891 milk shed/out-of-room and central section of Platform 2 (among the earliest surviving structures on the Illawarra line), and for its early (1887) brick example of a "J2" station masters residence design. The 1925 signal box, Platform 1, Platform 2 extension and moveable items are of historical significance as evidence of later upgrading of the station since 1925, and the residence is also of historical significance as evidence of late 19th century railway operational requirements to accommodate railway station staff on site.

Dunmore (Shellharbour) Railway Station is of aesthetic significance for its open setting affording views to the Illawarra escarpment, and for its collection of weatherboard buildings and platforms dating from 1887. The 1887 station building on Platform 2 is of aesthetic significance as a rare weatherboard awningless design station building. The residence is of aesthetic significance as a good representative example of a vernacular Victorian Georgian style dwelling, a precursor of the standard J2 Station Master's residence design, purpose-built for accommodation of the Station Master, and for its unusual siting, facing away from the railway station, some 100 metres distance from the station on a small hilltop with extensive views, and brick construction (despite the Dunmore station buildings being weatherboard).

The 1891 milk shed (aka out of room) is a rare early structure which has a later extension and conversion to a new use. The range of platform structures demonstrate the expansion of the station over time. The 1925 signal box is a good example of a simple signal box of this period of added significance as it contains the original signal levers.

Shellharbour railway station was listed on the New South Wales State Heritage Register on 2 April 1999 having satisfied the following criteria.

The place is important in demonstrating the course, or pattern, of cultural or natural history in New South Wales.

The Dunmore (Shellharbour) Railway Station is of state historical significance for its rare awningless 1887 platform building and 1891 milk shed/Out-of-room and central section of Platform 2 which are among the earliest surviving structures on the Illawarra line. The 1925 signal box, Platform 1, Platform 2 extension and moveable items are of historical significance as evidence of later upgrading of the station since 1925. The later conversion of the 1891 milk shed to an Out-of-room illustrates the declining use of rail transport by the dairying industry in the 20th century.

Dunmore (Shellharbour) Station Master's residence is of State historical significance as part of the overall Shellharbour Railway Station Group, as evidence of late 19th century railway operational requirements to accommodate railway station staff on site, as an early (1887) brick example of a J2 Station Master's residence design, constructed prior to the issue of a series of standard plans for railway residences in 1899, and for its historical association with the first phase of construction of the Illawarra line.

The place is important in demonstrating aesthetic characteristics and/or a high degree of creative or technical achievement in New South Wales.

Dunmore (Shellharbour) Railway Station is of aesthetic significance for its open setting affording views to the Illawarra escarpment, for its collection of weatherboard buildings and platforms dating from 1887. The 1887 Platform 2 building is of aesthetic significance as a rare weatherboard awningless design station building. The 1891 milk shed (aka Out-of-room) is a rare early structure which has later extension and conversion to a new use. The platform structures show expansion of the station over time. The 1925 signal box is a good example of a simple signal box of this period.

Dunmore (Shellharbour) Station Master's residence is of aesthetic significance as a vernacular Victorian Georgian style dwelling of the J2 Station Master's residence design, purpose-built for accommodation of the Station Master. The Dunmore (Shellharbour) Station Master's residence is also of aesthetic significance for its unusual siting, facing away from the railway station, some 100 metres distance from the station on a small hilltop with extensive views.

The place has strong or special association with a particular community or cultural group in New South Wales for social, cultural or spiritual reasons.

The place has the potential to contribute to the local community's sense of place, and can provide a connection to the local community's past.

The place possesses uncommon, rare or endangered aspects of the cultural or natural history of New South Wales.

The 1887 awningless weatherboard Platform 2 building is a rare platform building, one of only three of this design on the Illawarra line (with other examples at Bombo and Berry, the one at Berry having a 1901 awning addition). All examples of this type of platform buildings on the Illawarra line are weatherboard. The 1891 milk shed (later extended and converted to an Out-of-room) is a rare survivor of this type of station building. The platform structures at Dunmore are rare examples of open types of platform structures (only other example on the Illawarra line is at Bombo), the original central section of Platform 2 being particularly significant, despite later alteration.

The residence is rare as a precursor to the standard J2 design and exhibits the features of this design. The Station Master's residence is unusual for its siting facing away from the station, and brick construction materials though it is associated with a railway station with weatherboard buildings.

The place is important in demonstrating the principal characteristics of a class of cultural or natural places/environments in New South Wales.

Dunmore (Shellharbour) Railway Station is a representative rural station retaining structures from the period 1887–1925. The weatherboard signal box (1925) is representative of and typical of signal boxes of this period, of added significance for retaining its signal levers. With 20 levers it is a larger example than other comparable structures.

The Station Master's residence is a good representative example of a J2 design brick Station Master's residence, predating the 1899 issue of standard plans for railway residences.

== See also ==
- List of disused regional railway stations in New South Wales
