= Lake Illawarra High School =

Location
- Reddall Parade, Lake Illawarra, Illawarra region, New South Wales; Australia; 34°32′30″S 150°51′04″E

Information
- Type: Government-funded co-educational comprehensive secondary day school
- Motto: Seek the Truth
- Established: 1972; 54 years ago
- School district: Wollongong; Regional South
- Educational authority: New South Wales Department of Education
- Principal: Jenny Perry (2023–present)
- Teaching staff: 51.3 FTE (2018)
- Years: 7–12
- Enrolment: 515 (2018)
- Campus: Suburban
- Colours: Navy blue, sky blue, and white
- Website: lakeillawa-h.schools.nsw.gov.au

Lake Illawarra High School is a government-funded co-educational comprehensive secondary day school, located on Reddall Parade, which follows the shores of Lake Illawarra, in the Illawarra region of New South Wales, Australia.

Established in 1972, the school enrolled approximately 519 students in 2018, from Year 7 to Year 12, of whom 18 percent identified as Indigenous Australians and eight percent were from a language background other than English. The school is operated by the New South Wales Department of Education.

== See also ==
- List of government schools in New South Wales: G–P
- List of schools in Illawarra and the South East
- Education in Australia
