= Barrack Heights =

Barrack Heights Shellharbour, New South Wales
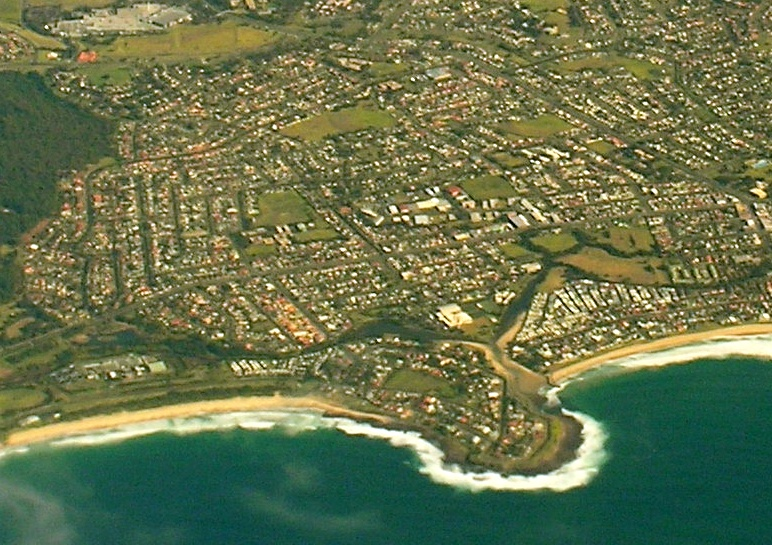

- Coordinates: 34°33′54″S 150°51′25″E
- Postcode(s): 2528
- Location: 16 km (10 mi) south of Wollongong
- LGA(s): City of Shellharbour
- Region: Illawarra
- County: Camden
- Parish: Terragong
- State electorate(s): Shellharbour
- Federal division(s): Whitlam
Suburbs around Barrack Heights:
| Mount Warrigal | Warilla | Warilla |
| Oak Flats, Shellharbour City Centre | Barrack Heights | Barrack Point |
| Blackbutt | Blackbutt | Shellharbour |

Barrack Heights is a suburb of the City of Shellharbour in New South Wales, Australia in the local government area of the same name. Many institutions are located in Barrack Heights, including Shellharbour Public Hospital, Shellharbour Private Hospital, Warilla Bowling Club, Warilla Sports Club and Warilla High School.

Barrack Heights is surrounded by the suburbs of Barrack Point, Blackbutt, Mount Warrigal, Oak Flats, Shellharbour, Shellharbour City Centre and Warilla.

== Demography ==
The 2021 census revealed that 6,003 lived in the suburb of Barrack Heights. Indigenous peoples accounted for 6.9% of the population.

=== Country of birth ===
- Australia - 4,540 (75.6%)
- England - 271 (4.5%)
- Macedonia - 168 (2.8%)
- New Zealand - 49 (0.8%)
- Scotland - 47 (0.8%)
- Germany - 45 (0.7%)

=== Language spoken at home ===
- English - 4,923 (82.0%)
- Macedonian - 229 (3.8%)
- Spanish - 71 (1.2%)
- Italian - 63 (1.0%)
- Serbian - 51 (0.8%)
- Croatian - 45 (0.7%)
