= Electoral district of Shellharbour =

Electoral district in New South Wales

Shellharbour New South Wales—Legislative Assembly
- Interactive map of district boundaries from the 2023 state election
- State: New South Wales
- Dates current: 2007–present
- MP: Anna Watson
- Party: Labor
- Namesake: Shellharbour
- Electors: 62,909 (2019)
- Area: 292.39 km^{2} (112.9 sq mi)
- Demographic: Provincial
Electorates around Shellharbour:
Wollondilly	Keira	Wollongong
Wollondilly	Shellharbour	Pacific Ocean
Goulburn	Kiama	Kiama

Shellharbour is an electoral district of the Legislative Assembly in the Australian state of New South Wales. It is represented by Anna Watson who won Labor preselection after the former member Lylea McMahon decided not to contest the 2011 election.

== Geography ==
It currently encompasses part of the City of Shellharbour (east of the South Coast line, as far south as Shell Cove, including Flinders, Shellharbour, Warilla, Barrack Heights, Barrack Point, Oak Flats, Mount Warrigal and Blackbutt) and the southwestern edge of the City of Wollongong (including Dapto, Kanahooka, Koonawarra, Horsley, Penrose and Yallah).

== History ==
The seat was created at the 2004 redistribution of electoral districts and took in the majority of voters from the abolished Illawarra, as well as territory that previously belonged to Wollongong and Kiama.

== Members for Shellharbour ==
Member	Party	Term
Lylea McMahon	Labor	2007–2011
Anna Watson	Labor	2011–present

== Election results ==
2023 New South Wales state election: Shellharbour
Party	Candidate	Votes	%	±%
Labor	Anna Watson	26,418	50.4	−7.2
Independent	Chris Homer	10,656	20.3	+20.3
Liberal	Mikayla Barnes	7,006	13.4	−13.8
Greens	Jamie Dixon	3,189	6.1	−3.3
Legalise Cannabis	Mia Willmott	2,246	4.3	+4.3
Liberal Democrats	Rita Granata	1,574	3.0	+3.0
Sustainable Australia	Kenneth Davis	1,306	2.5	−3.3
Total formal votes		52,395	96.2	+1.0
Informal votes		2,049	3.8	−1.0
Turnout		54,444	89.6	−2.5
Notional two-party-preferred count
Labor	Anna Watson	31,406	77.2	+8.8
Liberal	Mikayla Barnes	9,298	22.8	−8.8
Two-candidate-preferred result
Labor	Anna Watson	29,403	67.1	−1.3
Independent	Chris Homer	14,390	32.9	+32.9
Labor hold				
