= City of Shellharbour =

- Local government area
- Location in the Illawarra

- Interactive map of City of Shellharbour
- Coordinates: 34°35′S 150°52′E
- Country: Australia
- State: New South Wales
- Region: Illawarra
- Established: 1859
- Council seat: Shellharbour City Centre

Government
  - Mayor: Chris Homer
  - State electorates: Shellharbour; Kiama
  - Federal divisions: Whitlam; Gilmore

Area
  - Total: 147 km^{2} (57 sq mi)

Population
  - Totals: 76,271 (2021 census); 72,240 (2018 est.)
  - Density: 518.9/km^{2} (1,344/sq mi)
- Website: City of Shellharbour
LGAs around City of Shellharbour
| Wingecarribee | Wollongong | Tasman Sea |
| Wingecarribee | City of Shellharbour | Tasman Sea |
| Wingecarribee | Kiama | Tasman Sea |

The City of Shellharbour is a local government area in the Illawarra region of New South Wales, Australia. The city is located about 100 kilometres (62 mi) south of Sydney and covers the southern suburbs of the Wollongong urban area centred on Shellharbour. At the 2021 census, it had an estimated population of 76,271.

The area is bordered by the City of Wollongong to the north, with the boundary being the Lake Illawarra entrance (and the suburb of Lake Illawarra) and Macquarie Rivulet (Albion Park Rail). The Municipality of Kiama is to the south of the City of Shellharbour.

The mayor of the Shellharbour City Council is Chris Homer.

== History ==
Indigenous occupation of the area, particularly of Bass Point, can be traced back to 17,000 BCE.

The area was discovered by Europeans Bass and Flinders in 1796. Free settlers began arriving between 1817 and 1831 and the township was founded in 1851. The Shellharbour (Municipal) Council was constituted on 4 June 1859 following a proclamation in the New South Wales Government Gazette by the Governor Sir William Thomas Denison establishing the Municipality of Shellharbour under the Municipalities Act 1858. The municipality was proclaimed as the City of Shellharbour from 1 January 1996 by Governor Peter Sinclair and notified in the New South Wales Government Gazette on 22 December 1995. In May 2009, Shellharbour City Council celebrated its sesquicentenary.

A 2015 review of local government boundaries recommended that the City of Shellharbour merge with the City of Wollongong to form a new council with an area of 831 square kilometres (321 sq mi) and support a population of approximately 276,000. On 13 February 2017, the New South Wales Government decided not to forcibly amalgamate Shellharbour Council with Wollongong Council.

== Heritage listings ==
The City of Shellharbour has a number of heritage-listed sites, including:

- Albion Park, Tullimbar Road: Toongla
- Albion Park Rail, Princes Highway: Albion Park railway station
- Dunmore, Illawarra railway: Dunmore railway station
- Shell Cove, Boollwarroo Parade: Bass Point Reserve

== Suburbs ==
The City of Shellharbour contains the following suburbs and localities:

- Albion Park
- Albion Park Rail
- Barrack Heights
- Barrack Point
- Blackbutt
- Calderwood
- Croom
- Dunmore
- Flinders
- Lake Illawarra
- Macquarie Pass
- Mount Warrigal
- North Macquarie
- Oak Flats
- Shell Cove
- Shellharbour
- Shellharbour City Centre
- Tongarra
- Tullimbar
- Warilla
- Yallah
- Yellow Rock

== Council ==
=== Current composition and election method ===
As of 2023, Shellharbour City Council is composed of eight councillors elected proportionally in four wards. Under the Local Government (Shellharbour and Wollongong Elections) Act, 2011 (NSW), councillors are elected to hold office until September 2024. Since 2021, the mayor has been directly elected.

The current council, elected in 2021, is:

| Ward | Councillor | Party |
|---|---|---|
| Mayor | Chris Homer | Independent |
| A Ward | Kellie Marsh | Kellie Marsh Independents |
| A Ward | Maree Edwards | Labor |
| B Ward | Moira Hamilton | Labor |
| B Ward | John Davey | Local Voice |
| C Ward | Colin Gow | Independent |
| C Ward | Lou Stefanovski | Labor |
| D Ward | Jacqueline Graf | Independent |
| D Ward | Rob Petreski | Labor |

== Election results ==
=== 2024 ===
2024 New South Wales local elections: Shellharbour
| Party | Votes | % | Swing | Seats | Change |
|---|---|---|---|---|---|
| Labor | 18,870 | 40.2 | −21.6 | 3 | ▼1 |
| Kellie Marsh Independents | 8,705 | 18.6 | −6.9 | 2 | ▲1 |
| Chris Homer Independents | 6,958 | 14.8 | | 1 | Steady |
| Kane Murphy Independents | 4,784 | 10.2 | | 1 | ▲1 |
| Independents | 7,586 | 16.2 | −0.1 | 1 | ▼1 |
| Formal votes | 46,903 | 92.3 | | | |
| Informal votes | 3,940 | 7.7 | | | |
| Total | 50,843 | | | 8 | |
| Registered voters / turnout | | | | | |

=== 2021 ===
2021 New South Wales local elections: Shellharbour
| Party | Votes | % | Swing | Seats | Change |
|---|---|---|---|---|---|
| Labor | 21,199 | 61.8 | +12.5 | 4 | ▲1 |
| Kellie Marsh Independents | 8,746 | 25.5 | | 1 | |
| Independent | 5,583 | 16.3 | | 2 | |
| Local Voice | 3,454 | 10.1 | | 1 | |
| Community Voice | 3,416 | 10.0 | | 0 | |
| Formal votes | 34,282 | 94.9 | | | |
| Informal votes | 1,845 | 5.1 | | | |
| Total votes | 36,127 | 100.0 | | | |
| Registered voters / turnout | 55,825 | 64.71 | | | |

== Attractions ==
Shellharbour City has many attractions for family entertainment and recreation. In Albion Park Rail there is a Light Rail Museum and steam trains, Historical Aircraft Restoration Society (HARS) Museum, and Albion Oval; a local sports ground. Shellharbour Village, the beach and playground are also popular attractions. Excellent fishing at Lake Illawarra and superb surfing at Warilla beach. A cycleway goes from Oak Flats to Barrack Point. The Macquarie Valley (Shellharbour) provides scenic views and also includes the Macquarie Pass National Park.

There are various beaches in Shellharbour such as the Blacks Beach, Shellharbour North Beach, Shellharbour South Beach, Warilla Central Beach, Warilla North Beach, and Warilla South Beach which are some of the major crowd pullers.

== See also ==
- Local government areas of New South Wales
