= Shellharbour =

- Suburb
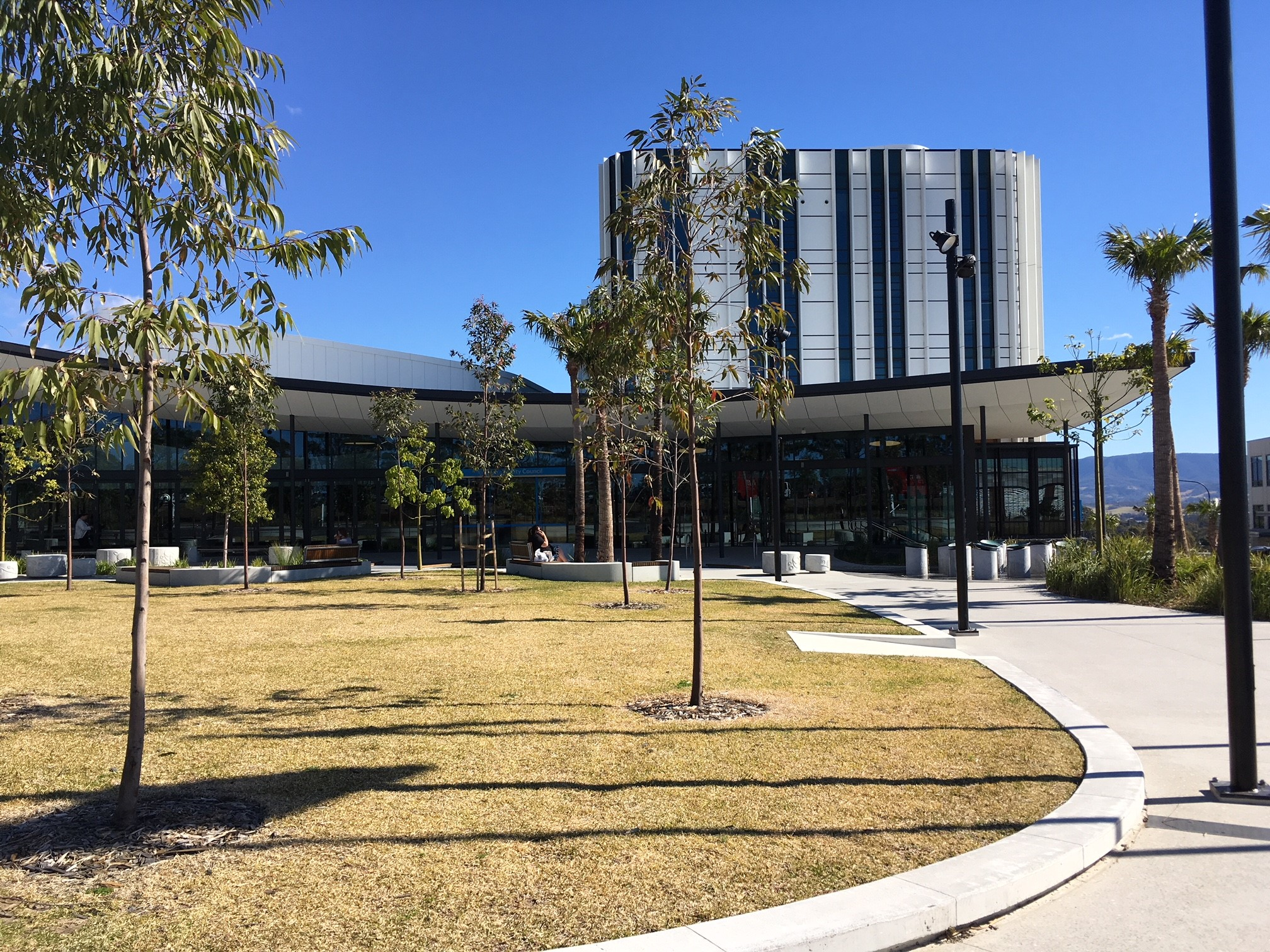
- Shellharbour Civic Centre and Library

- Coordinates: 34°35′S 150°52′E
- Country: Australia
- State: New South Wales
- Region: Illawarra
- LGA: City of Shellharbour
- Location: 85 km (53 mi) South of Sydney; 20 km (12 mi) South of Wollongong; 160 km (99 mi) NW of Canberra
- Established: 1817

Government
  - State electorate: Shellharbour
  - Federal division: Whitlam
- Time zone: UTC+10 (AEST)
  - Summer (DST): UTC+11 (AEDT)
- Parish: Terragong

Shellharbour (also known as Shellharbour Village) is a suburb located in the Illawarra region of New South Wales, Australia. It also gives its name to the local government area, City of Shellharbour, and its central business district, Shellharbour City Centre.

The suburb is centred on the small recreational harbour named Shell Harbour. It has two main beaches: Shellharbour Beach, which runs to Barrack Point and Shellharbour South Beach, which runs toward Bass Point.

Shellharbour hosts Harbourside Markets on the fourth Sunday of the month, in Little Park.

== History and culture ==
The area was inhabited by indigenous Australians for thousands of years. European habitation began from about 1817 onwards. Shellharbour was originally known as Yerrowah and later as Peterborough.

Shellharbour's coastline is littered with 9 shipwrecks, and other historical sites like Bass Point which is home to various Aboriginal archaeological evidence. The shipwrecks date back to 1851, and are all protected under the State NSW Heritage Act 1977 & Commonwealth Historic Shipwrecks Act 1976.

Shipwrecks include:

- Alexander Berry – Wrecked at Bass Point on 1 July 1901.
- Amphitrite – Ran aground at Shellharbour on 15 May 1851.
- Bertha – Wrecked in a gale on 9 September 1879.
- Cities Service Boston – Went ashore at Bass Point on 16 May 1943.
- Comboyne – Wrecked off Bass Point on 27 November 1920.
- Echo – Wrecked near Long Point on 21 March 1863.
- Franz – Wrecked near Lake Illawarra on 9 September 1879.
- Our Own – Ran aground at Bass Point on 21 August 1880.

There were other shipwrecks that have no surviving remnants, including the Stone Fleet ship Kiltobranks, which went aground near Shellharbour, during a gale on 21 February 1924, and became a total loss.

== Facilities ==
Shellharbour is undergoing extensive development with the construction of many new retail outlets and home-units. The main street is Addison Street, with many footpath cafés and shops and the Roo Theatre Company, running through the town and ending with the Ocean Beach Hotel opposite the harbour. Adjacent to the harbour is the Beverley Whitfield saltwater swimming pool and across from the Shellharbour Beach facilities is the Beverley Whitfield park, containing the Tom "Scout" Willoughby cricket oval.

== Demographics ==
According to the 2021 census of population, there were 3,520 people in Shellharbour.

- Aboriginal and Torres Strait Islander people made up 3.8% of the population.
- 81.1% of people were born in Australia. The next most common country of birth was England 4.5%.
- 88.5% of people only spoke English at home.
- The most common responses for religion were No Religion 35.7%, Catholic 27.5% and Anglican 17.2%.

== Notable people ==
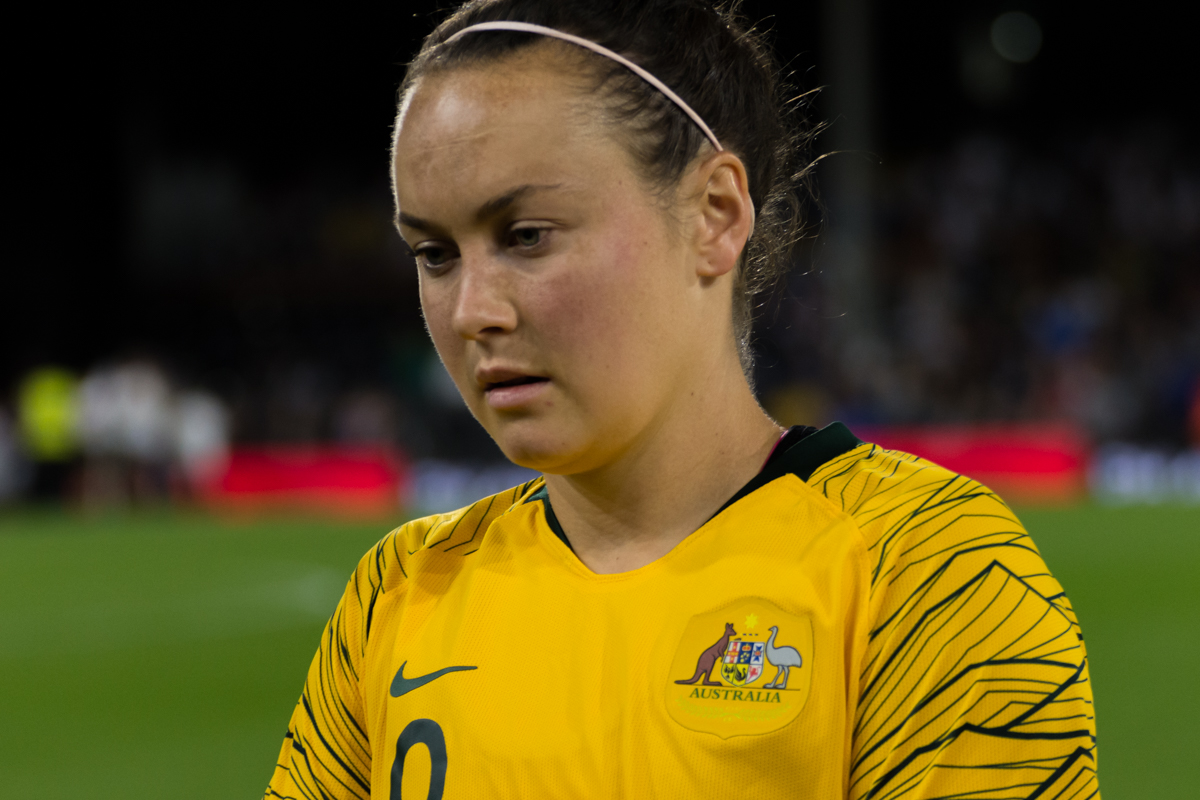
- Caitlin Foord
  Edward Allen – politician
- James Bell – Australian rules footballer
- Josh Bingham – soccer player
- Trudy Burke – soccer player
- Ron Costello – rugby league player
- Adam Docker – rugby league player
- Jai Field – Rugby League Player / Super League Player
- John Daniel FitzGerald – politician
- Caitlin Foord – soccer player, Arsenal and the Matildas
- Jackson Ford – rugby league player
- Madeline Heiner – runner
- Beau Henry – rugby league player
- Rikeya Horne – rugby league player
- Michelle Heyman – soccer player, Matildas
- Kane Linnett – rugby league player
- Dan Palmer – rugby union player
- Ellen Perez – tennis player
- John Reid – politician
- Casey Sablowski – hockey player
- David Smith – canoeist
- Alexander Volkanovski – UFC Champion
- Beverley Whitfield – swimmer
- Adam Zampa – cricketer
