= Division of Whitlam =

Australian federal electoral division

Coordinates: 34.534°S 150.552°E

Whitlam Australian House of Representatives Division
- Interactive map of electorate boundaries from the 2025 federal election
- Created: 2016
- MP: Carol Berry
- Party: Labor
- Namesake: Gough Whitlam
- Electors: 130,155 (2025)
- Area: 2,966 km^{2} (1,145.2 sq mi)
- Demographic: Provincial
Electorates around Whitlam:
Riverina	Hume	Cunningham
Riverina	Whitlam	South Pacific Ocean
Eden-Monaro	Gilmore	Gilmore

The Division of Whitlam is an Australian electoral division in the state of New South Wales.

Whitlam is a predominantly middle-class and working-class electorate which covers 2,966 square kilometres in the southern Illawarra and the Southern Highlands.

It was created in 2016 and has since been held by the Australian Labor Party. Its current Member of Parliament (MP) has been Carol Berry since the 2025 federal election. It was previously held by Stephen Jones, who was first elected in 2010 in the now-former seat of Throsby.

== Geography ==
Federal electoral division boundaries in Australia are determined at redistributions by a redistribution committee appointed by the Australian Electoral Commission. Redistributions occur for the boundaries of divisions in a particular state, and they occur every seven years, or sooner if a state's representation entitlement changes or when divisions of a state are malapportioned.

When the division was created in 2016, it covered areas similar to the previous Division of Throsby. These areas included the eastern half of Wingecarribee Shire, such as Mittagong, Bowral, Moss Vale and Berrima, and areas surrounding Lake Illawarra in Wollongong City and Shellharbour City. Unlike Throsby, Whitlam covered the entire area of Shellharbour City. At the 2024 redistribution, Whitlam gained the balance of Wingecarribee Shire from Hume and lost areas north and east of Lake Illawarra to Cunningham.

Since 2025, Whitlam includes the entirety of Shellharbour City and Wingecarribee Shire, and the south-western part of Wollongong City, including Dapto. Most of the division's boundaries are co-extensive with the northern, western and southern boundaries of Wingecarribee Shire and the southern boundary of Shellharbour City.

Whitlam has a strong working-class character due to the presence of industries such as steelmaking, coal mining and stevedoring in the Illawarra.

== History ==
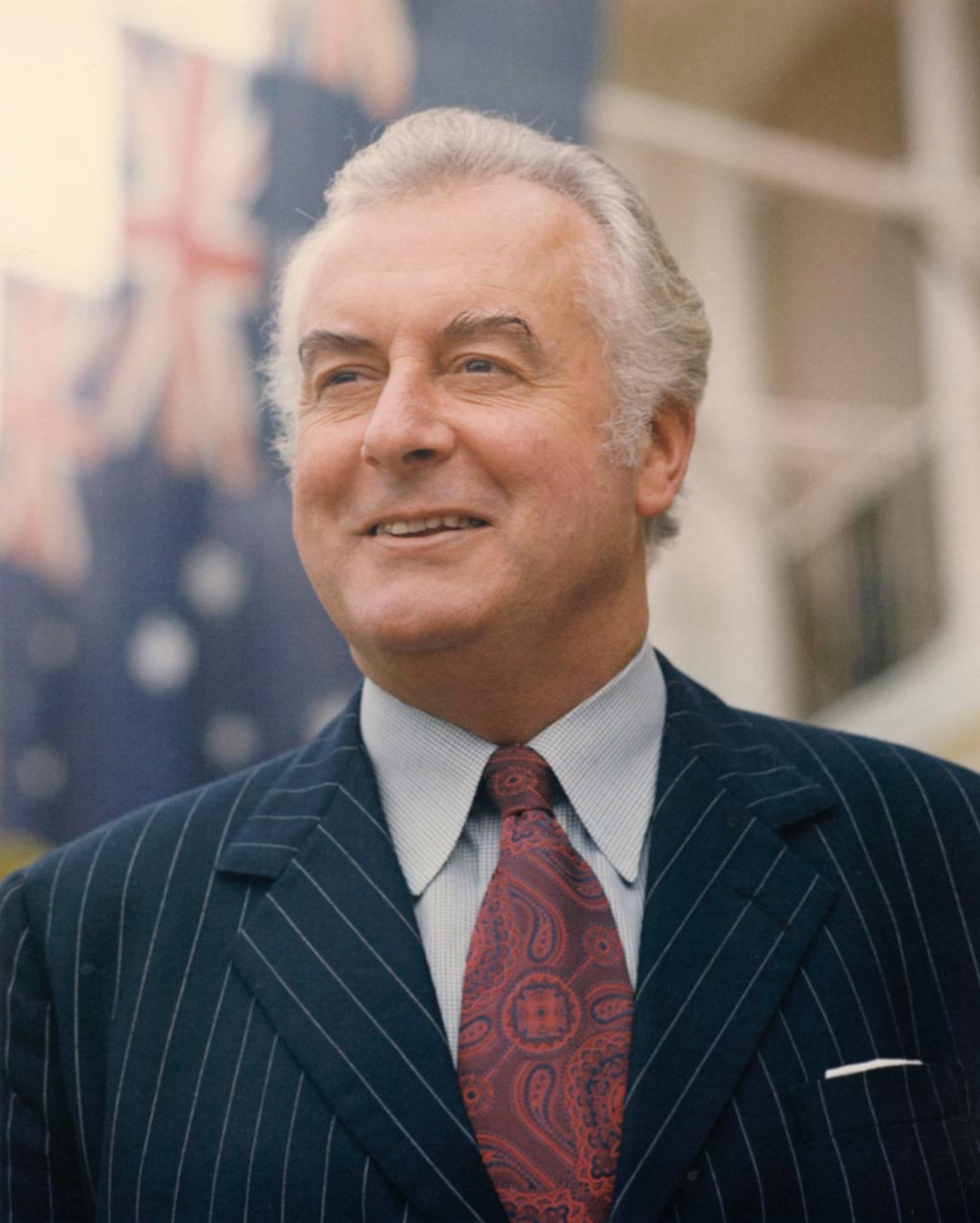
Gough Whitlam, the division's namesake

The division, previously named Throsby, was renamed in honour of Gough Whitlam, the Prime Minister of Australia from 1972–75, in a February 2016 electoral distribution. It came into effect from 2 July 2016, the date of the 2016 Australian federal election.

ABC election analyst Antony Green estimated that boundary changes to Throsby would reduce the Australian Labor Party's notional two-party-preferred margin from 7.8 to 6.9 percentage points. Despite this, the last member for Throsby, Stephen Jones, easily retained the seat with a healthy swing of over six points.

== Members ==
Image	Member	Party	Term	Notes
	Stephen Jones (1965–)	Labor	2 July 2016 – 28 March 2025	Previously held the Division of Throsby. Served as minister under Albanese. Retired
	Carol Berry (1975–)	Labor	3 May 2025 – present	Incumbent

== Election results ==
2025 Australian federal election: Whitlam
Party	Candidate	Votes	%	±%
Labor	Carol Berry	42,230	38.63	−3.76
Liberal	Nathaniel Smith	30,908	28.27	−1.56
Greens	Jamie Dixon	13,558	12.40	+1.96
One Nation	Sharon Cousins	8,379	7.66	+0.78
Independent	Ben Britton	5,246	4.80	+4.80
Trumpet of Patriots	Angelo Cuda	3,101	2.84	+2.84
Independent	Paddy Moylan	2,211	2.02	+2.02
Independent	Glenn Butterfield	1,905	1.74	+1.74
Libertarian	Raymond Khoury	1,188	1.09	−2.42
Citizens	Cheryl Hinton	590	0.54	+0.54
Total formal votes		109,316	90.18	−5.06
Informal votes		11,909	9.82	+5.06
Turnout		121,225	93.18	+4.12
Two-party-preferred result
Labor	Carol Berry	61,486	56.25	−2.06
Liberal	Nathaniel Smith	47,830	43.75	+2.06
Labor hold		Swing	−2.06	
