= Toongla =

- Location within New South Wales Location within Australia
- 34°34′48″S 150°44′30″E
- Location: 41 Tullimbar Road, Albion Park, City of Shellharbour, New South Wales, Australia

History
- Built: 1873

Site notes
- Architectural style: Victorian

New South Wales Heritage Register
- Official name: Toongla
- Type: State heritage (built)
- Designated: 2 April 1999
- Reference no.: 556
- Type: Villa
- Category: Residential buildings (private)

Toongla is a heritage-listed former residence and dairy farm and now residence at 41 Tullimbar Road, Albion Park in the City of Shellharbour local government area in the Illawarra region of New South Wales, Australia. It was built during 1873. The property is privately owned. It was added to the New South Wales State Heritage Register on 2 April 1999.

== History ==
It is believed that Toongla was built by Maurice Scanlan some time after his purchase of the property in December 1873. It was a dairy farm at the time and he later mortgaged it to the Commercial Banking Company of Sydney (1892).

In 1898, William Moles bought Toongla and farm in 1898. William Moles was a founding member of Shellharbour Municipal Council in 1859 serving as an Alderman and its second Mayor. Moles was also acting Town Clerk for a time, served as the areas Senior Magistrate and one of the pioneer breeders of Australian Illawarra Short-horn cattle.

The title passed to his daughters Barbara and Marion Douglas Moles after their father's death in 1911. They sold it to Mr. Leonard Anderson in February 1930.

In 1987 the then owners Mr and Mrs Walsh requested that Permanent Conservation Order be placed over the property because of their concern for its long term protection. A Permanent Conservation Order was placed over the property on 20 November 1987. It was transferred to the State Heritage Register on 2 April 1999.

The property is a portion of an estate, originally granted to John Paul and named "Tullimbar", after a local tribal leader. The original estate seems to have been divided mid-century into lesser portions, which were occupied by new settlers. Further research is necessary to identify the builder of "Toongla" and ascertain the year in which it was built.

Maurice Scanlon and his family are the first settlers known to have resided on the property, arriving there in 1873. The Scanlon family initially referred to their residence as "Green Mount Villa". In 1886 the family changed the homestead's name to "Toongla". It is not known whether the present residence is the original homestead, or a second building erected by the Scanlon family in 1886.

In 1898 the homestead was occupied by William Moles, a longstanding settler on the "Tullimbar" Estate. Moles had acquired a neighbouring portion of the estate in 1859, and had erected "Hillcrest", a slab cottage, behind the site of the Tullimbar School (see separate entry). The Moles family were important pioneers in the local dairy industry. The property had close associations with the development of the Illawarra Shorthorn breed of cattle.

The house is believed to have been built by Maurice Scanlan some time after his purchase of the original property in December 1873. It was a dairy farm at the time and he later mortgaged it to the Commercial Banking Company of Sydney (1892). In 1898, William Moles, the second Mayor of Shellharbour Municipality, moved to this residence from his Tongarra property. Title passed to his daughters Barbara and Marion Douglas Moles after their father's death in 1911. They sold it to Mr Leonard Anderson in February 1930. Owners in the late 1980s early 1990s were Mr M. and Mrs J. Simon.

== Description ==
Toongla is sited on a north facing ridge off a quiet country lane along the fertile valley leading to the Macquarie Pass National Park. The residence enjoys commanding rural, lake and escarpment views. The property is approximately 1.4 hectares (3.5 acres) mostly grassed paddock with a large garden around the house with well established trees beside. The present land area is 18 hectares (45 acres). Curtilage includes area within a 100 metres (330 ft) radius of the house.

House

Toongla is a largely intact Victorian villa constructed of colonial bonded brickwork, now painted, its main roof has a hipped iron form with three large stuccoed chimneys. Possibly a smaller building originally, later extended to the east, as evidenced by the chimneys.

The northern verandah has a bellcast roof bevelled posts and iron lace brackets. The facade is asymmetrical, featuring two 12-paned windows, three French windows opening onto the front verandah and a main four panelled door with sidelight.

Stone steps, with masonry piers either side, lead up to a wide entrance door. Glass transom lights, timber & glass side panels. Other windows are double-hung, with six panes in the top frame.

The interiors have cedar joinery, some iron ceilings, two interesting fireplaces of marbled wood with tiles and grates. It has an established garden and orchard.

Outbuildings

There is a small slab outbuilding at the rear with an iron roof, a former laundry, remains of sites of other outbuildings. A portion of the original slab kitchen may still stand at the rear.

The house is tenanted. The building is completed in the Late Victorian villa architectural style. The building materials used include Colonial bonded brickwork, hipped iron roof, stuccoed chimneys, cedar joinery, and iron ceilings.

=== Condition ===
As at 3 October 2000 the archaeological potential was high (remains of slab building at rear and outbuildings).

=== Modifications and dates ===
- 1997 – addition of shower and toilet to existing laundry.

== Heritage listing ==
As at 3 October 2000, Toongla was an example of a largely intact Victorian Villa. It is associated with William Moles, a founding member of Shellharbour Council, Acting Town Clerk, Senior Magistrate and one of the pioneers of Shorthorn cattle breeding in the Illawarra.

A late 19th century homestead. One of the last remaining examples of this particular architectural style in the area. Strong links with historical and industrial development of the area and an exceptionally high degree of aesthetic beauty.

A good example of a traditional Georgian type, set on a high hill and prominent on views from the main road. Distinguished by its elegant, dominant, iron roof and verandah. Important historical associations with the local dairy industry and the development of the Illawarra Shorthorn breed of cattle.

Toongla was listed on the New South Wales State Heritage Register on 2 April 1999 having satisfied the following criteria.

The place is important in demonstrating the course, or pattern, of cultural or natural history in New South Wales.

Toongla is an example of a largely intact Victorian Villa. It is associated with William Moles, a founding member of Shellharbour Council, Acting Town Clerk, Senior Magistrate and one of the pioneers of Shorthorn breeding in the Illawarra.
