= Yallah =

- Suburb
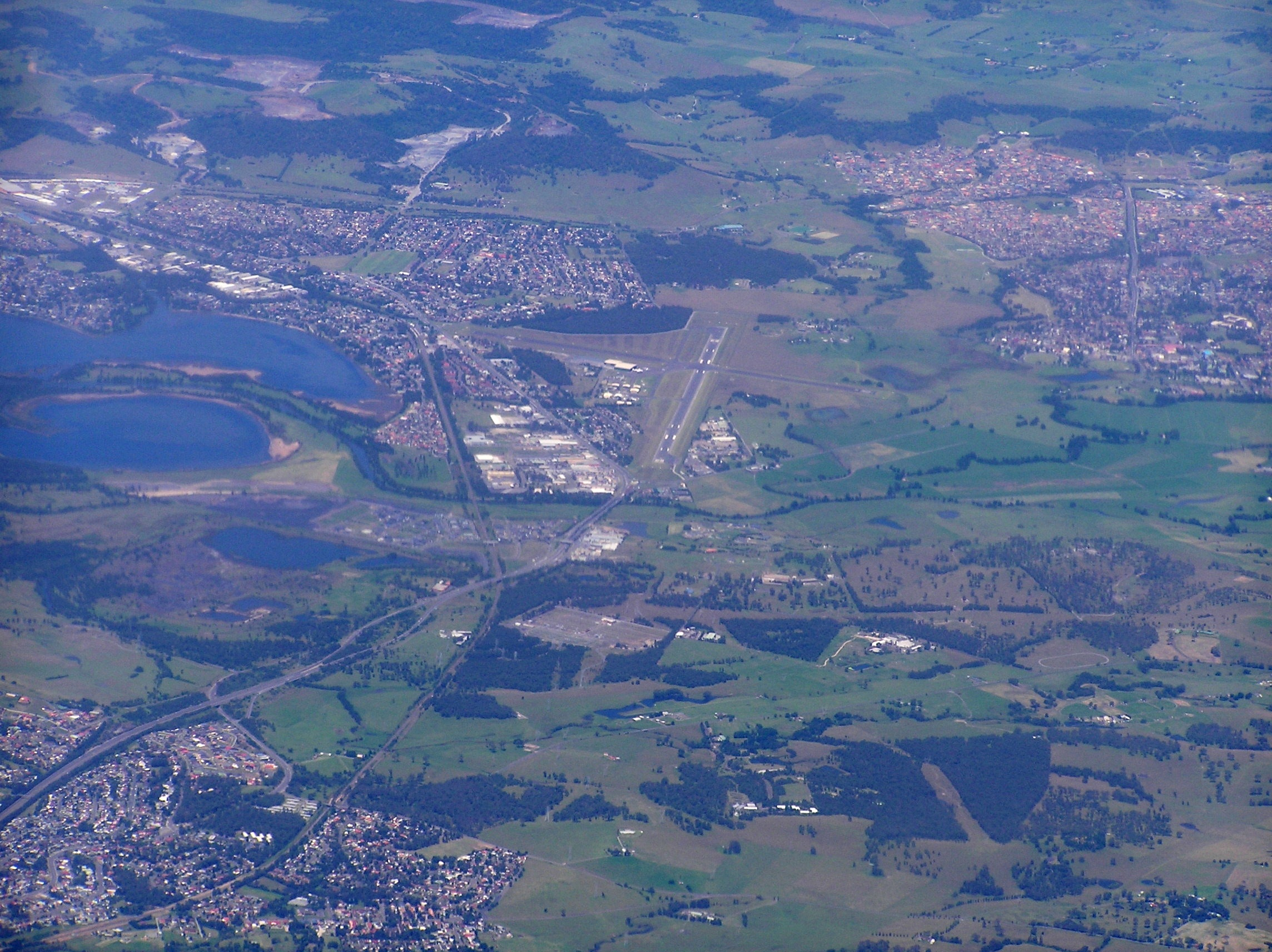
- An aerial view of the area looking south, with Yallah, bottom left; Albion Park Rail, top left; Albion Park, top right; and Lake Illawarra, centre-left.

- Interactive map of Yallah
- Coordinates: 34°32′S 150°48′E
- Country: Australia
- State: New South Wales
- Region: Illawarra
- City: Wollongong
- LGA: Wollongong

Government
  - State electorate: Shellharbour
  - Federal division: Whitlam
- Postcode: 2530
- County: Camden
- Parish: Calderwood
Suburbs around Yallah
Avondale	Dapto	Koonawarra
Marshall Mount	Yallah	Lake Illawarra
Calderwood	Albion Park Rail	Haywards Bay

Yallah is a western suburb in the City of Wollongong, New South Wales, Australia, located on the western shore of Lake Illawarra. It contains a mixture of rural, commercial and light industrial areas.

== Etymology ==
Yallah is an Australian Aboriginal word for which a number of meanings are given; native apple tree, a nearby lagoon, and "go away at once".

== Developments ==
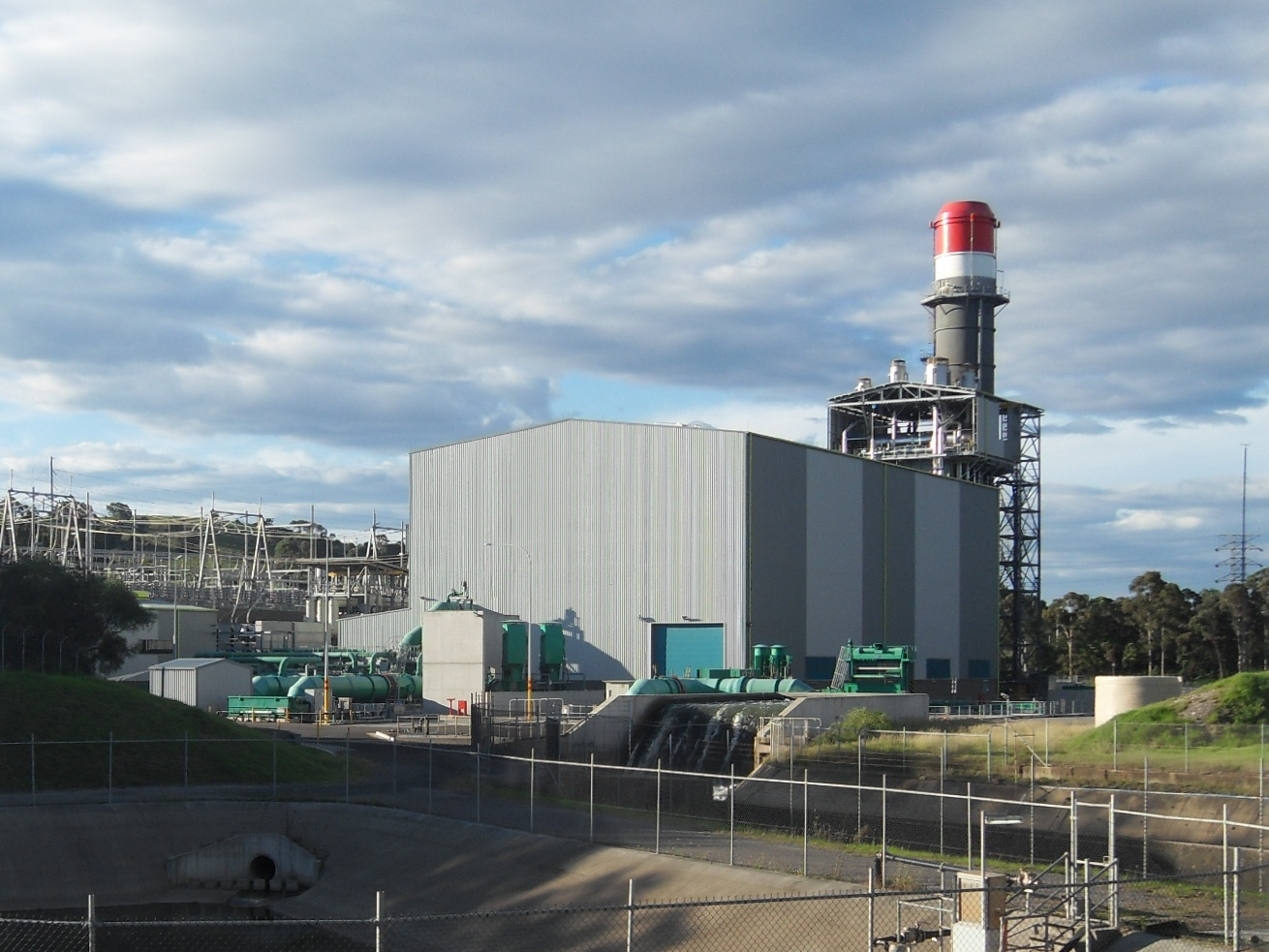
Tallawarra Power Station

The Tallawarra Power Station located on the shores of Lake Illawarra and adjacent to Yallah was commissioned in 1952 and commenced operations in 1954 as a thermal power station. The power station was closed in 1989 and was later rebuilt as a 435-megawatt (583,000 hp) combined cycle natural gas power station.

The South Coast railway line runs through the suburb. Yallah railway station opened in 1887, and closed in 1974 and no station presently exists.

The Princes Motorway southern terminus is located south of Yallah and north of Albion Park Rail, at the junction of the Princes Highway with the Illawarra Highway.

== See also ==
- Illawarra
