= Illawarra Highway =

Highway in New South Wales

Illawarra Highway New South Wales
- Coordinates: 34.586090°S 150.250175°E (West end); 34.563590°S 150.777644°E (East end)

General information
- Type: Highway
- Length: 60.7 km (38 mi)
- Gazetted: August 1928 (as Main Road 262); March 1951 (as Trunk Road 88); July 1962 (as State Highway 25)
- Route number(s): A48 (2013–present)
- Former route number: National Route 48 (1974–2013) Entire route; State Route 80 (1974–2013) (Avoca–Robertson)

Major junctions
- West end: Hume Highway; Hoddles Cross Roads, New South Wales
- Sheepwash Road
- East end: Princes Motorway; Albion Park, New South Wales

Location(s)
- Major settlements: Sutton Forest, Moss Vale, Robertson

Highway system
- Highways in Australia; National Highway • Freeways in Australia; Highways in New South Wales

Illawarra Highway is a state highway in New South Wales, Australia. It connects Wollongong to the Southern Highlands and links Princes Highway and Hume Highway. It is named after the geographical area it crosses, the Illawarra region.

== Route ==
Illawarra Highway commences at the interchange with Hume Highway at Hoddles Cross Roads west of Sutton Forest and heads in a northeasterly direction as a two-lane, single-carriageway road until it reaches Moss Vale, after which it heads in an easterly direction through Robertson until it reaches the Macquarie Pass, where the road twists through hairpin curves as it descends the Illawarra escarpment through Macquarie Pass National Park and crosses the Macquarie Valley to the coastal region around Shellharbour. After passing through Tongarra, the highway eventually terminates at the interchange with Princes Motorway in Albion Park.

The Macquarie Pass, with many hairpin bends and steep gradients, is unsuitable for large and articulated vehicles: trucks are instead advised to use the Mount Ousley Road (route B88), also known as Picton Road.

Both Robertson and Moss Vale are country towns with 19th-century buildings still intact, and Macquarie Pass has one of the southernmost stands of Australia's sub tropical rainforest.

== History ==
The passing of the Main Roads Act of 1924 through the Parliament of New South Wales provided for the declaration of Main Roads, roads partially funded by the State government through the Main Roads Board (MRB). Main Road No. 260 was declared from the intersection with Hume Highway at the Cross Roads (today Hoddles Cross Roads) west of Sutton Forest to Moss Vale (and continuing north via Bowral to the intersection with Hume Highway at Mittagong), and Main Road No. 262 was declared from Moss Vale via Robertson and Macquarie Pass to the intersection with Princes Highway at Albion Park, on the same day, 8 August 1928.

The Department of Main Roads, which had succeeded the MRB in 1932, declared Trunk Road 88 on 28 March 1951, from Cross Roads via Moss Vale and Robertson to the intersection with Princes Highway 1 mile north of Albion Park railway station; the southern end of Main Road 260 was truncated to meet Trunk Road 88 at Moss Vale, and Main Road 262 was reduced to a 2.5km stretch between Albion Park and Albion Park railway station. This was replaced with the declaration of State Highway 25 along the same route on 4 July 1962, subsuming Trunk Road 88. State Highway 25 was named Illawarra Highway on 22 February 1967.

The passing of the Roads Act of 1993 through the Parliament of New South Wales updated road classifications and the way they could be declared within New South Wales. Under this act, Illawarra Highway today retains its declaration as Highway 25, from Hoddles Cross Roads to Albion Park.

The route was allocated National Route 48 in 1974. With the conversion to the newer alphanumeric system in 2013, this was replaced with route A48.

== Major intersections ==
LGA	Location	km	mi	Destinations	Notes
Wingecarribee	Hoddles Cross Roads	0.0	0.0	Canyonleigh Road (west) – Canyonleigh	Western terminus of highway and route A48
Wingecarribee	Hoddles Cross Roads	0.0	0.0	Hume Highway (M31) – Sydney, Goulburn	Diamond interchange
Wingecarribee	Sutton Forest	6.8	4.2	Exeter Road – Exeter	
Wingecarribee	Moss Vale	12.4	7.7	Main Southern railway line	
Wingecarribee	Moss Vale	13.5	8.4	Sutton Road (north) – Moss Vale; Argyle Road (east) – Bowral, Mittagong	Roundabout
Wingecarribee	Moss Vale	17.3	10.7	Nowra Road – Kangaroo Valley, Nowra	
Wingecarribee	Avoca	23.6	14.7	Sheepwash Road – Nowra, Mittagong	
Wingecarribee	Robertson	33.8	21.0	Unanderra–Moss Vale railway line	
Wingecarribee	Robertson	37.4	23.2	Unanderra–Moss Vale railway line	
Wingecarribee	Robertson	37.7	23.4	Jamberoo Mountain Road – Jamberoo, Kiama	
Wingecarribee	Robertson	38.6	24.0	Unanderra–Moss Vale railway line	
Wingecarribee	Robertson	40.3	25.0	Unanderra–Moss Vale railway line	
Macquarie Rivulet		50.2	31.2	Bridge over the river (no known name)	
Shellharbour	Albion Park	59.4	36.9	Tongarra Road (east) – Albion Park Rail, Shellharbour; Terry Street (south), to Jamberoo Road – Jamberoo, Kiama	Traffic light intersection
Shellharbour	Albion Park	60.7	37.7	Princes Motorway (M1) – Wollongong, Sydney	Northbound exit and southbound entry only; eastern terminus of highway and route A48
1.000 mi = 1.609 km; 1.000 km = 0.621 mi: Incomplete access; Route transition

== See also ==
- Highways in Australia
- List of highways in New South Wales
