= Calderwood Christian School =

Location
- 234 Calderwood Road; Calderwood, New South Wales; Australia; 34°33′25″S 150°45′18″E

Information
- Type: Independent, Christian school
- Motto: In Christ's Service
- Religious affiliation: Christian
- Established: 1989; 37 years ago
- Chairman: Andrew Spence
- Principal: Darren Hutton
- Grades: Preschool – Year 12
- Gender: Co-educational
- Enrolment: c. 320
- Website: calderwoodcs.nsw.edu.au

Calderwood Christian School is an independent, co-educational Christian school located at Calderwood Valley in the Illawarra Region of New South Wales, Australia. The school currently caters for more than 360 students from preparatory school to Year 12.

== History ==
Calderwood Christian School was founded in 1989 as Tongarra Christian School operating out of All Saints Church in Albion Park, New South Wales with 14 students.

In 1994, the school amalgamated with Illawarra Christian School to form one association with two campuses and was referred to as Illawarra Christian School – Tongarra Campus. The first year 7 class commenced at Tongarra in 1995 and in 2000 the first Year 12 students graduated from the campus.

In 1996, the school moved to its current location from Albion Park. It wasn't until 2017 that the Tongarra campus was registered with NESA as an individual school now known as Calderwood Christian School.

== Governance ==
Calderwood Christian School is governed by Illawarra Christian Education.

== Associated schools ==
Calderwood Christian School currently has a sister school operated by Illawarra Christian Education:

- Illawarra Christian School, Cordeaux Heights
