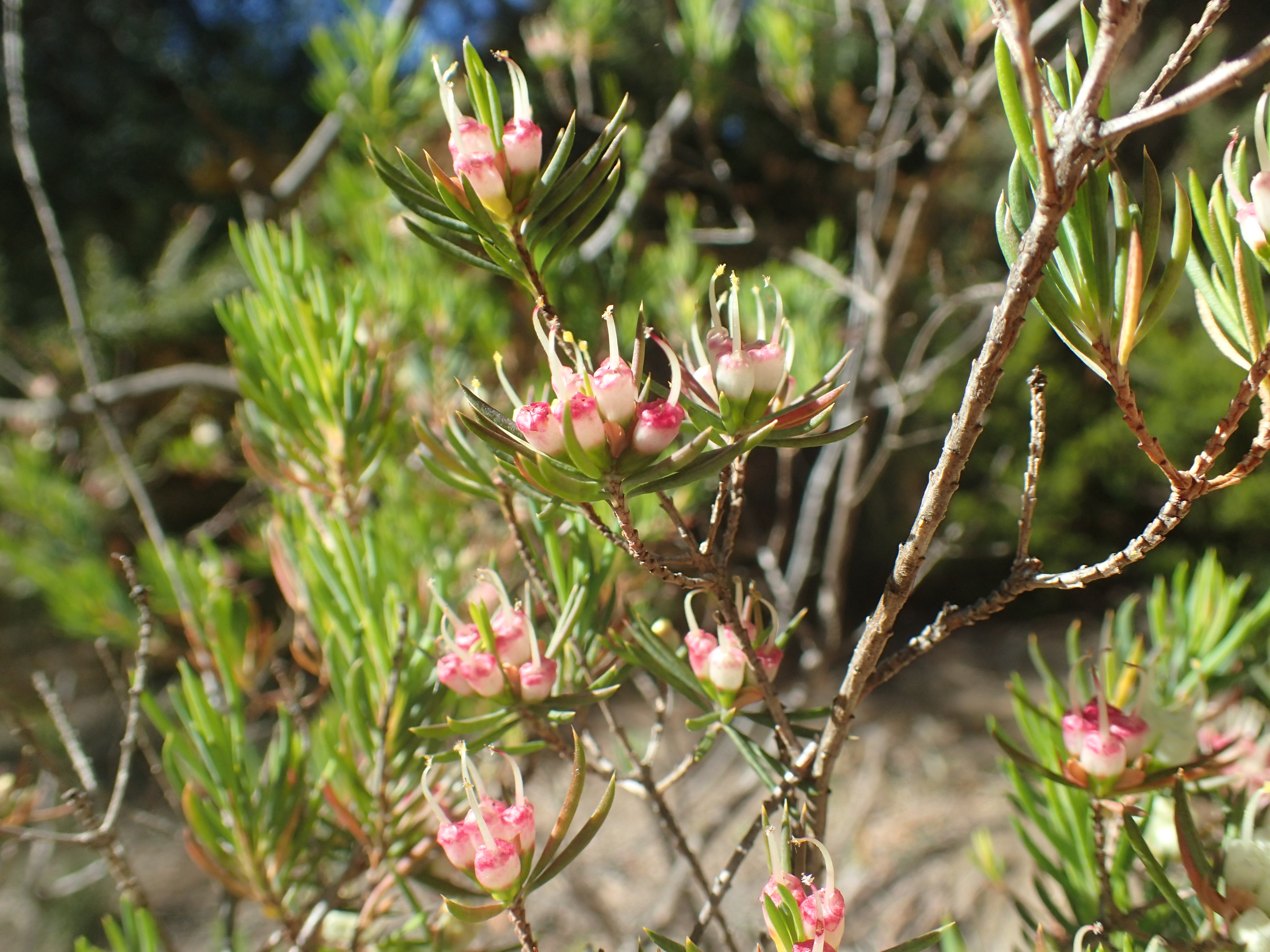
- Darwinia briggsiae in the ANBG

Scientific classification
- Kingdom: Plantae
- Clade: Tracheophytes
- Clade: Angiosperms
- Clade: Eudicots
- Clade: Rosids
- Order: Myrtales
- Family: Myrtaceae
- Genus: Darwinia
- Species: D. briggsiae

Binomial name
- Darwinia briggsiae Craven & S.R.Jones
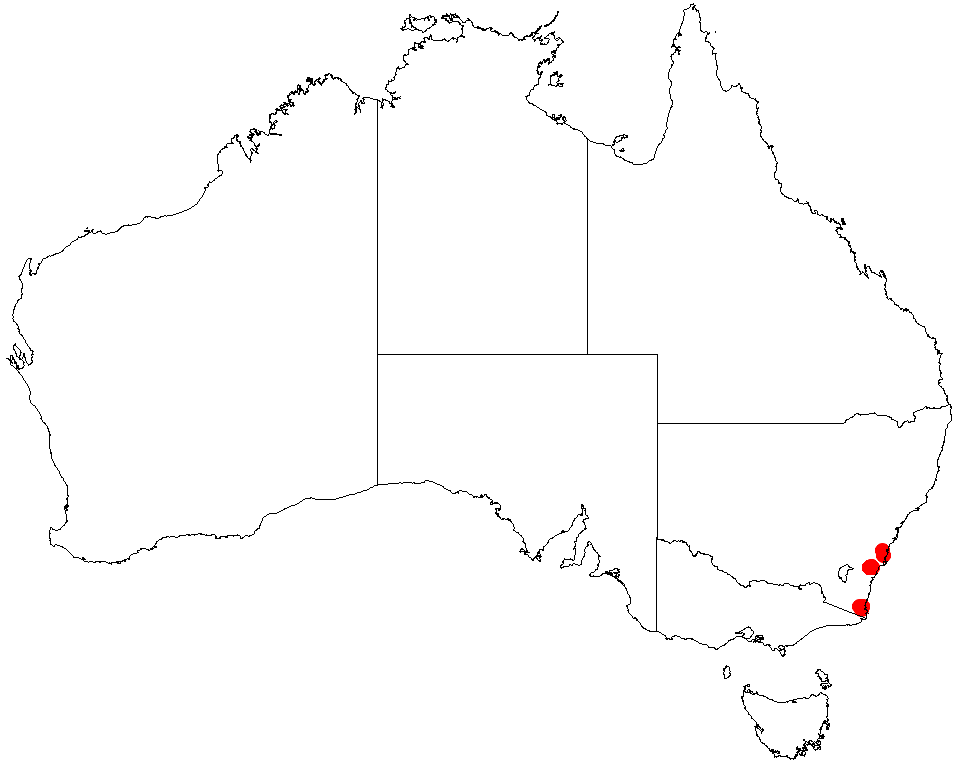
- Occurrence data from AVH

= Darwinia briggsiae =

Species of flowering plant

Darwinia briggsiae is a plant in the myrtle family Myrtaceae and is endemic to New South Wales. It is an erect shrub with linear-shaped leaves and small groups of pink and white flowers.

== Description ==
Darwinia briggsiae is an erect shrub which grows to a height of 1.5 metres (5 ft). It has glabrous, linear leaves 11–18 millimetres (0.4–0.7 in) long, about 1 millimetre (0.04 in) wide with a dished upper surface. The flowers are arranged in groups of up to six, each with a stalk 0.5–1 millimetre (0.02–0.04 in) long in a leaf axil. The floral cup is about 5 millimetres (0.2 in) long and 1–2 millimetres (0.04–0.08 in) in diameter with five ribs. The sepals are triangular and about 0.5 millimetres (0.02 in) long, the petals 1–1.5 millimetres (0.04–0.06 in) long and all are slightly notched on the upper end. The style is 7–8 millimetres (0.28–0.31 in) and protrudes from the flower tube. Flowering occurs from September to March.

== Taxonomy and naming ==
Darwinia briggsiae was first formally described in 1991 by Lyndley Craven and S.R.Jones and the description was published in Australian Systematic Botany. The specific epithet (briggsiae) is in recognition of Australian botanist Barbara G. Briggs.

== Distribution and habitat ==
This darwinia grows in heath and she-oak thickets in the Budawang Range and at Macquarie Pass.
