= Bathurst Showground =

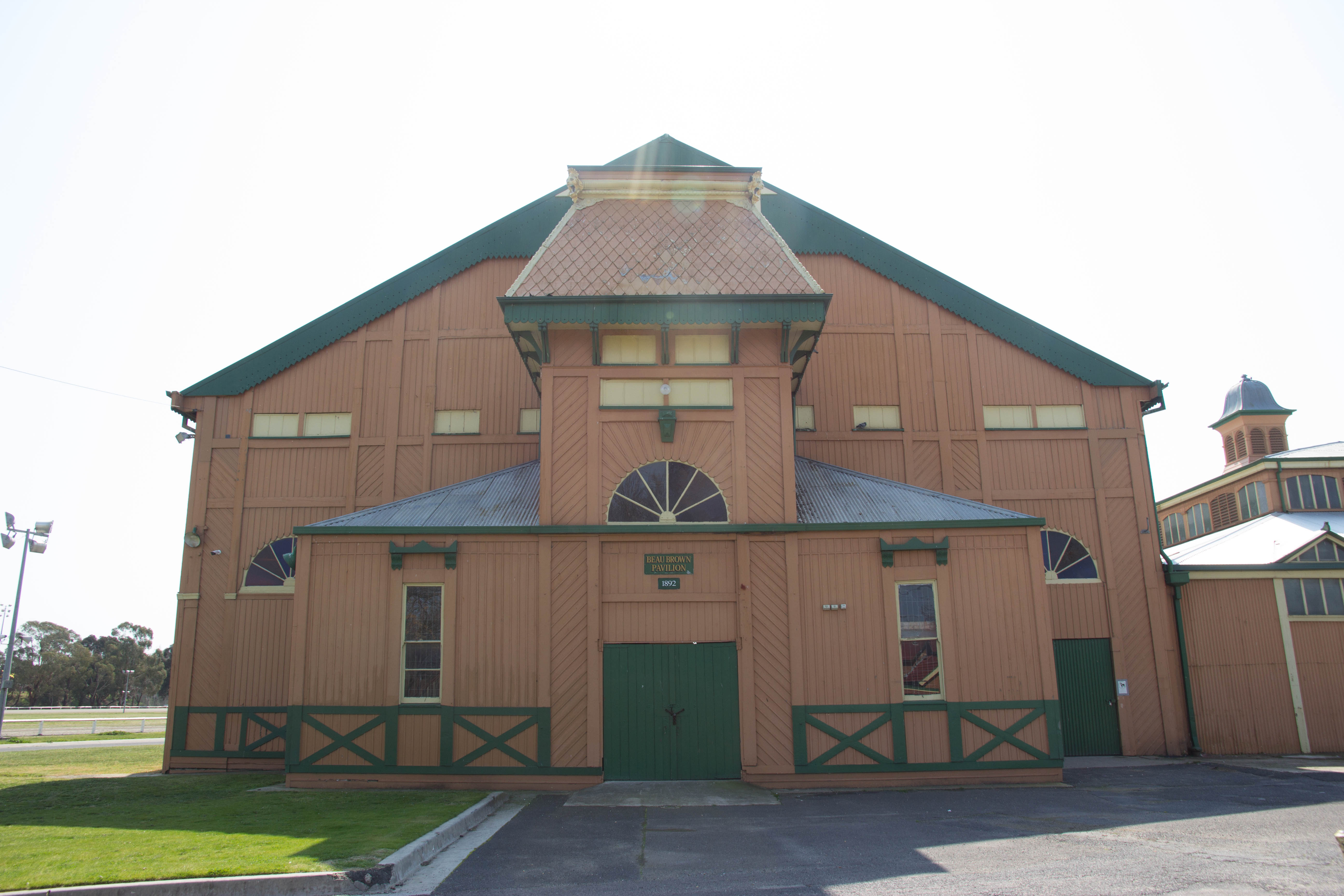
- The Beau Brown Pavilion, erected in 1892

- Location within New South Wales Location within Australia
- 33°24′58″S 149°35′18″E
- Location: Kendall Avenue (Great Western Highway), Bathurst, Bathurst Region, New South Wales, Australia

History
- Built: 1879–

Site notes
- Architects: James Hines; J. J. Copemen; Edward Gell
- Owner: Bathurst Showground Trust; Department of Trade & Investment, Regional Infrastructure & Services

New South Wales Heritage Register
- Official name: Bathurst Showground; Bathurst Showgrounds
- Type: State heritage (complex / group)
- Designated: 4 September 2015
- Reference no.: 1960
- Type: Showground
- Category: Community Facilities
- Builders: Various

The Bathurst Showground is a heritage-listed showground on Kendall Avenue (Great Western Highway), Bathurst, in the Central West region of New South Wales, Australia. It was designed by James Hines, J. J. Copemen and Edward Gell and built from 1879. The property is owned by Bathurst Showground Trust and the New South Wales Department of Trade & Investment, Regional Infrastructure & Services. It was added to the New South Wales State Heritage Register on 4 September 2015.

== History ==
=== Indigenous occupation and European settlement ===
The Macquarie Valley, in which Bathurst was later situated, was inhabited by the Wiradjuri people, their land extending from the western side of the Great Dividing Range to the Darling River. The Wiradjuri were impacted early by the expansion of pastoralist and retaliated with a series of attacks. Governor Brisbane declared martial law in August 1824, but the attacks continued with a man named Windradyne being a prominent figure in resistance. Windradyne became associated with the Suttor family, who maintained friendly relations with the Wiradjuri and advocated on their behalf.

=== Agriculture ===
The Bathurst district was the first European settlement in the interior of the Australian continent, having been proclaimed by Governor Macquarie on 7 May 1815. The area was deemed necessary for the expansion of the colony. Governor Macquarie, being opposed to graziers with large holdings, was hoping the land would be opened up as small holdings for the production of wheat. While wheat was grown, the grazing of first cattle and then sheep, became more important. The wheat industry was hampered by a lack of supply networks to Sydney markets and the majority of the harvests were consumed locally, although Gold Rush towns became a significant market during the 1850s and 1860s. Despite this, four flour mills were open in Bathurst in 1862 and five were operating in 1886. The transportation issue was solved in 1876, when the railway line was extended from Lithgow

Fruit growing began early in the region's history, but commercial production began around the turn of the century. The industry was pioneered by the Bathurst Government Agricultural Experiment Farm (or Agricultural Research Station), established in 1895 and was greatly expanded by soldier settlements after World War I. In response, Gordon Edgell & Sons opened a small cannery in 1926.

=== Bathurst Agricultural, Pastoral and Horticultural Association ===
Although several ploughing matches were held during the 1850s, the first lasting agricultural society was established in 1860 at the village of O'Connell, 23.5 kilometres to the south east of Bathurst. Attempts were made as early as 1855 to establish an association for the promotion of agriculture. The local paper, the "Free Press" argued an association was necessary as farmers in the district were not taking up labour and time saving technology, such as winnowers and thrashers, as eagerly as they aught. While this early attempt at establishing an association failed, the successfully established Association had at its core the aim of encouraging scientific farming methods. The annual Shows must have had mixed success in this respect, as the technological phobias of the districts farmers were mentioned again in 1894, the press believing that farming was carried out in "a very crude manner".

An additional motivation of the Association was to gather the scattered occupants of the region together so that "ignorance would not flourish and to provide an avenue for socialisation". A reporter in 1921 in the "Bathurst Times" summed up the success the show achieved in this respect saying "Not since Bathurst has been Bathurst has there been a time - outside stress time - when the people have been so united as they are over the Show." Towards this end the Show also arranged a wide range of social activities that expanded during its history.

O'Connell held a show on Easter Monday, 9 April 1860, which was well attended. As well as a ploughing contest, there were classes for the best colonial bred bull, draught and blood stallions, brood mares, fine-wooled rams, fine-wooled ewes, pigs. poultry, wheat and farming implements. The show was held again in 1861 and 1862, with extended exhibits on both occasions.

On the completion of the 1862 show a group of prominent Bathurst citizens met with the O'Connell Association with the view to forming an association that would represent the wider region. At a public meeting on 19 June 1862 the O'Connell Association accepted an invitation to join the newly formed Bathurst Agricultural Association. The Association went through several name changes, finally settling on the Bathurst Agricultural, Horticultural and Pastoral Association.

The 1863 show was held at "Alloway Bank", the property of William Henry Suttor. By the following year land had been purchased at Raglan, 8 kilometres east of Bathurst, which was leased to a farmer to create some income. The show continued to be held in Raglan until 1868, when it was transferred to the Bathurst racecourse. The committee believed that the full potential of the show could not be realised at the Racecourse. (Sir) Francis Bathurst Suttor, a member of the New South Wales Legislative Assembly and son of William Henry Suttor, secured from the Government a land grant of 5.08 hectares (12.5 acres). The site had previously been cattle markets, established in around 1833.

The site was ready for the 1878 show, which has been held there ever since. In 1888 an extended area was granted by the Bathurst City Council and substantial alterations and additions were made to the grounds in light of this. During the following year the area was fenced, trees were planted, new horse and cattle stalls were erected and a half mile trotting track was formed. A further grant was given in 1890, which allowed the trotting track to be extended into an oval. This took the site to approximately 16.19 hectares (40 acres). The planting of trees formed a major part of the improvements to the grounds, partly as it was a stipulation of the original land grant, but also because it was seen that plantings added substantially to the public amenity of the Showgrounds. The importance that was placed on the plantings is borne out by the engagement of architect Edward Gell, for 50 pounds, to provide advice on the issue.

During the early 1860s the committee flirted with having both a spring and autumn show. Ultimately, the spring show was unsuccessful and was abandoned. From the move to their own grounds a group of structures were erected to fulfil the needs of the Show. The individual histories of some of these structures are outlined below.

In 1878 the show had been extended to two days and by 1883 it was decided that a three-day show was warranted, to ensure the auctioning of produce did not interfere with the objectives of the show. The objectives were to improve agricultural practices to be able to complete with other areas and to improve the breeding of livestock in the area.

The Bathurst Show was an annual occasion to which the district could look forward to, not only for the amusements, but also as an introduction to new ideas. At the 1876 show, for example, the newspaper noted that the women were fascinated by the preserves exhibited by Mrs. J. Rutherford. These were "in bottles of a peculiar construction and were protected by glass covers which were secured by metal rings." They were particularly applauded for their ability to preserve fruit for substantial lengths of time. Towards the end of the century, the Show brought the first rotary disc ploughs, irrigation pumps, bath heaters, milk separators and shearing equipment seen in the area. The expanding program of the Show also indicates the popularisation of new technologies in the district. The introduction of bicycle races in 1883 is a case in point.

The introduction and extension of the Main Western railway to Bathurst in the 1870s did much for the Show. The Department of Railways, for a time, offered discounted rates for those travelling to the Show. The special rates encouraged visitors from as far as Sydney and Orange to attend, the drawcard not only being the cheap travel, but also who was opening the Show. The Committee had considerable success in attracting prominent men to perform this task, including several Premiers (Sir George Dibbs, Hon. John See), Governors (Lord Hampden) and other dignitaries, including Lord and Lady Jersey. This success is indicative of the esteem with which the show was held.

From 1904 attendance declined due to the announcement by the Department of Railways that it would no longer offer discounted fares. Their introduction again in 1908 lead to a rise in gate takings.

During World War One, plans were proceeding for the 1916 show, despite the war, when the committee was applied to by Captain Eade of the army to use the grounds as a military camp. Eade promised that the grounds would be returned to their previous condition and that trotting meetings could continue. The Committee agreed to the request, abandoned the 1916 show and applied to the Government to have the Government loan reduced by 700 pounds. The military took up the show grounds on 1 January 1916, but on 5 October 1916 the Macquarie River and Vale Creek flooded, forcing the Army off. The Show Committee were unhappy with the state in which the Army had left the grounds and, together with the effects of the flood, the grounds were in no state to hold a show in 1917.

A show was held in 1918, and the 1919 show was in preparation, when the Government forbade large gatherings of people in an attempt to curb the influenza epidemic. Shows continued from 1920 until 1942, when the Defence Department applied to the Committee to use the Showgrounds as a training camp. Having learnt from their experience during World War One, the Committee set a strict agreement in place to allow the Army to occupy the site. The next show was not held until 1946.

The Committee vetted the amusements to maintain propriety and good taste. The most notable additions to the program were Probasco's Circus in 1898 and Wirth's in 1901. During this period there was a continual increase in the number and variety of sideshows. The Bathurst Show became a favourite for the States travelling carnie families, being one of the most profitable, some of whom have continued to return for 100 years.

A range of concerts and dances were introduced, expanding the social element of the show. The first fancy dress ball, in 1903, was attended by 80 couples, but only one couple wore fancy dress. As the AH&P; offices were destroyed by fire in 1910 the evolution of the ball is unclear. A ball was held in 1921, while these balls were a great social success, they were not financially lucrative, and only ran until 1925.

The Show also attracted to Bathurst Musical and Dramatic Societies, circuses, picture shows and jazz shows. Some local residents began to complain about the number, claiming that people were no longer supporting the Bathurst Music and Drama Society and the Bathurst picture show. The number of side-shows was also steadily increasing.

In 1905 a Smoking Evening was held. The evenings allowed men to watch a motion picture while smoking, which they could not do in "mixed" company. The event was revived in 1923 and proved to be very successful, not only socially, but also as fundraisers to reduce the loan on the Showground. Subsidiary shows, such as the smoke evenings, were abandoned during the Great Depression of the 1930s. Despite the downturn in business the Show was still seen as "a great occasion for those who live on the outskirts of the district, as it offers them an excuse for a days rest and a chance to meet old friends."

After World War II the Show continued to grow in reputation and the quality of the exhibits. It was claimed to be second only to the Sydney Royal Easter Show. In 1965 the first track display was held at night under newly installed floodlights. In 1968 the 100th show was celebrated. During the 1970s it was necessary to mortgage the Showground in order to give the Bank of New South Wales security for an overdraft, which the Committee had operated the finances through for many years. An additional loan was taken out in 1976 to renovate the Beau Brown Pavilion. In the late 1970s the trotting track was upgraded in order that the arena could be recognised as first class by the Racecourse Development Committee. On the completion of the improvements the NSW Trotting Authority approved a new race - the Gold Crown, which was run for the first time on 21 March 1987.

In 1986 the grounds were extensively damaged by a flood and major repairs were required to the track, the boundary fence, internal carpets and vehicles parked on the grounds.

To mark the event of the 125th show, in 1993, the Association successfully applied to Buckingham Palace for permission to include "Royal" in the title.

=== Modifications and dates ===
The following developments and modifications have been made to the site:

- 1878, 16–17 April – First show on the AH & P's own (present) ground – some modifications to the land undertaken.
- 1879 – Construction of the first permanent structure on the Showgrounds – the Howard Pavilion, erected as an exhibition building
- 1882 – Gas lighting installed in the Howard Pavilion to provide suitable lighting for the remunerative night openings
- 1883 – Sinclair Pavilion built.
- 1885 – Caretaker's residence and Don Leitch Pavilion built. Also pig pavilion, sheep shed, poultry pavilion & six earth closets
- 1888 – Land adjacent to the showground leased from Bathurst City Council.
- 1889 – Substantial alterations and additions undertaken to make use of new land, included fencing area, planting trees, dismantling and re-erecting the horse and cattle stalls and the laying of a half mile trotting track
- 1891 – Application for more land granted. Part of Bentinck Street Closed and Thomson Street created. Poultry shed converted into an agricultural hall
- 1891–92 – Grandstand and Art Gallery (Beau Brown Pavilion) brought from Ashfield and erected in Bathurst.
- 1893 – Grounds illuminated with electric light
- 1898 – Trevitt Pavilion erected.
- 1902 – NSW Trotting Club established.
- 1916, 1 January – Military occupation of the showground. – modifications, especially to Grandstand, undertaken.
- c. 1924 – Showground connected to sewerage and electricity
- 1928 – Pig section eliminated and sheep used pens instead
- 1940, 3 April – Sam Williams Memorial Gates erected.
- 1942–45 – Military occupation of the showground – further modifications undertaken.
- 1952 – In honour of a visit by Her Majesty the Queen the Noel Moxon Grandstand was painted as well as repairs to the Gatekeepers cottage. Prior Cattle Pavilion built.
- 1954, 14 November – Night trotting introduced, necessitating the erection of lighting.
- 1965 – New floodlights installed in arena
- 1966 – Major renovations undertaken on Noel Moxon grandstand to the value of $16,000. New concrete floor in Howard Pavilion. New office for Show Secretary constructed.
- 1975 – The Owens Stand opened.
- 1986, 5–6 August – Showground flooded; extensive damage.
- 1987 – Major conservation work on Beau Brown Pavilion.
- 1991 – Ron Wood Stable Complex completed.

== Description ==
=== Landscape ===
The showground is located on the edge of the city and is an impressive introduction to the city of Bathurst on the eastern approach. The site is bounded by Kendall Avenue, the Macquarie River and Vale Creek. The slope of the land towards the creek to the west has contained the buildings to the north, east and south of the site. The dominant landscape feature is the gravelled race track, surrounding a levelled grass arena.

Plantings complement the topography and arrangement of the site. Improvements began in 1878 with the planting of a range of deciduous and evergreen species, many of which are still extant. The species chosen included English elm (Ulmus procera), ash (Fraxinus sp), pine (Pinus sp.), cypress (Cupressus sp.), black locust (Robinia pseudoacacia) and Osage orange (Maclura pomifera). Stands were scattered throughout the grounds, while row plantings were restricted to the perimeter of the site. The track was originally ringed with English elms, many of which have now been removed, however a row still exists on the western boundary. More recently a wider range of species have been planted, including some eucalypts including Mugga ironbark (Eucalyptus sideroxylon). Replacement planting has occurred, but has been unsuccessful in some instances due to the use of different genetic stock.

=== Buildings ===
There are roughly 35 buildings in the showgrounds, dating from 1879 to the present. A full description of each is available in the Conservation Management Plan. The CMP divided the showground into six zones: the Historic Exhibition Zone, characterised by pavilions for the display of agricultural produce and handy work and the livestock pens; the Grandstand Zone, focused on the Noel Moxton Grandstand and incorporating subsidiary buildings such as a bar and tote; the Stable Zone, being mainly horse stables; the Arena Zone, consisting of the track and arena; the Display and Development Zone, which was still under development when the Cultural Management Plan was completed; and the Open Zone, a grassed area that also contains the Dog Show Shed. Overall, a unified fairground aesthetic is created, despite the eclectic use of timber, iron and masonry, which is complemented by the setting on the Macquarie River and the plantings described above.

==== The Beau Brown Pavilion ====
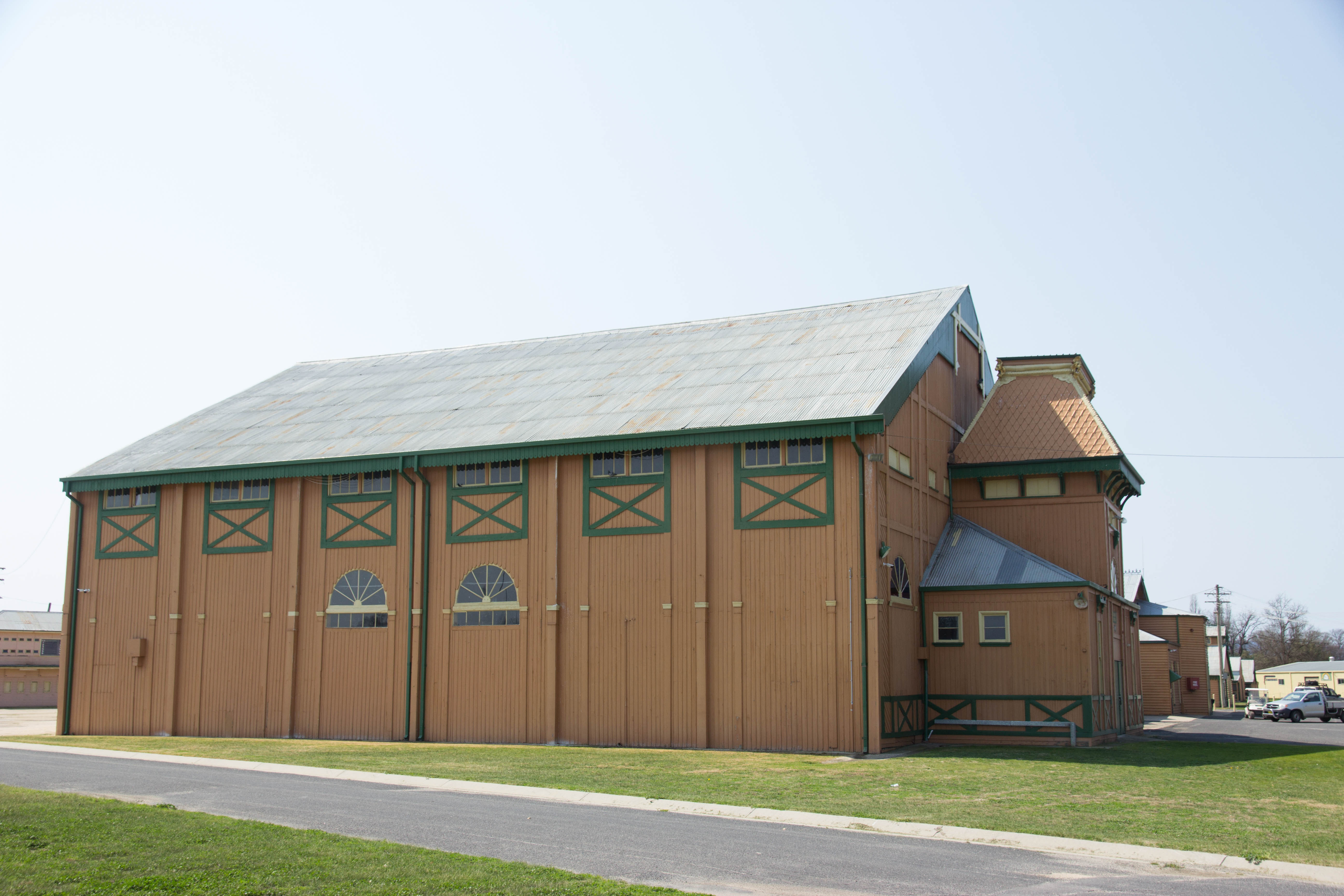
A side view of The Beau Brown Pavilion, looking east.

This pavilion, though not the oldest structure at the Showground, is the largest single enclosed space. The building commenced its life in suburban Sydney in about 1886, when it was erected as a skating rink at the Ashfield Recreation Ground. However, by the end of that decade the management of the Ashfield Recreation Ground, a private company, was in financial trouble and the decision was taken to sell its buildings. The Association purchased the Pavilion and the Grandstand and re-erected both at the Bathurst Showground in time for the show of 1892. The Pavilion was also known as the Art Gallery. In 1895, following a disastrous storm in the previous year which damaged several showground buildings, the Pavilion was "strengthened", presumably by adding more wind bracing.

In 1967 the pavilion was renamed to honour "the work carried out in various capacities by Mr. B. A. Brown". A major renovation programme was instituted in 1987, mainly to halt perceived structural movement. This included steel bracing, a new concrete floor and relining the walls with the present boarding.

The building is timber framed, with a main interior uninterrupted by supports, the space being spanned by bolted and laminated timber trusses, held on stout sawn timber posts. The trusses, which divide the structure into six bays, have bottom chords arranged so as to impart an approximately semicircular form, springing from about 2 metres above the level of the concrete floor, and top chords supporting a pitched roof iron, springing from wall plate height. There are steel lateral truss ties at two levels, the first level with the top of the wall boarding and the second just below wall-plate level.

The trusses are unusual, being wide in span and of bolted laminated sawn timber construction. The main elevation faces south, is distinctively broad and gabled, being marked by its central entrance porch, flanked by small rooms with hipped roofs and surmounted by the stumpy tower. The tower has decorative bracketed eaves and a roof in the form of a truncated square pyramid. The tower's pitched roof has sheet metal tiles in a fish-scale pattern, crowned by a pressed metal cornice, featuring decorative mouldings and lions heads.

There is also a small central pediment motif above the eaves of the south face. It is this tower which imparts to the building its unusual Victorian Second Empire style. Of almost equal interest is the treatment of the remainder of this front, which includes fine panelled and patterned boarding, notched and bracketed barge boards, eaves soffits, scalloped friezes and a radiating design over the semicircular windows, decorated window lintels and a prominent "keystone", all done in cut and fretted timber.

==== The Trevitt Pavilion ====
This pavilion bears the date 1897, and was built originally as a poultry pavilion. Plans by the architect J.J. Copemen were accepted by the Association late in 1897. The successful tenderers for the construction were Frederick and Alfred Rigby. The pavilion was named after 1952 to commemorate the service of Mr Ken Trevitt, manager of the Western District Exhibit at both the Sydney Royal Easter Show and at Bathurst and also to mark the long association of his father and grandfather with the exhibit.

The building, comprises a high centre section with a hipped roof, surrounded by a clerestory, below which are peripheral aisles also having hipped roofs. The centre section has very tall round-log columns supporting a roof structure of sawn timbers. The floor is trowelled concrete.

Being the centre of a group of three, being flanked by the Beau Brown and Howard Pavilions, the pavilion has only its north and south walls visible. The north elevation is very simple, with wall sheeting and one doorway. The south or front elevation consists of nine "bays" of uneven width, marked by wide vertical cover straps and sheeted in corrugated iron. At the centre of the roof ridge there is a large cupola. The dome of the cupola is sheeted in ripple iron with a knob at the crown where it once supported a flagpole.

==== The Howard Pavilion ====
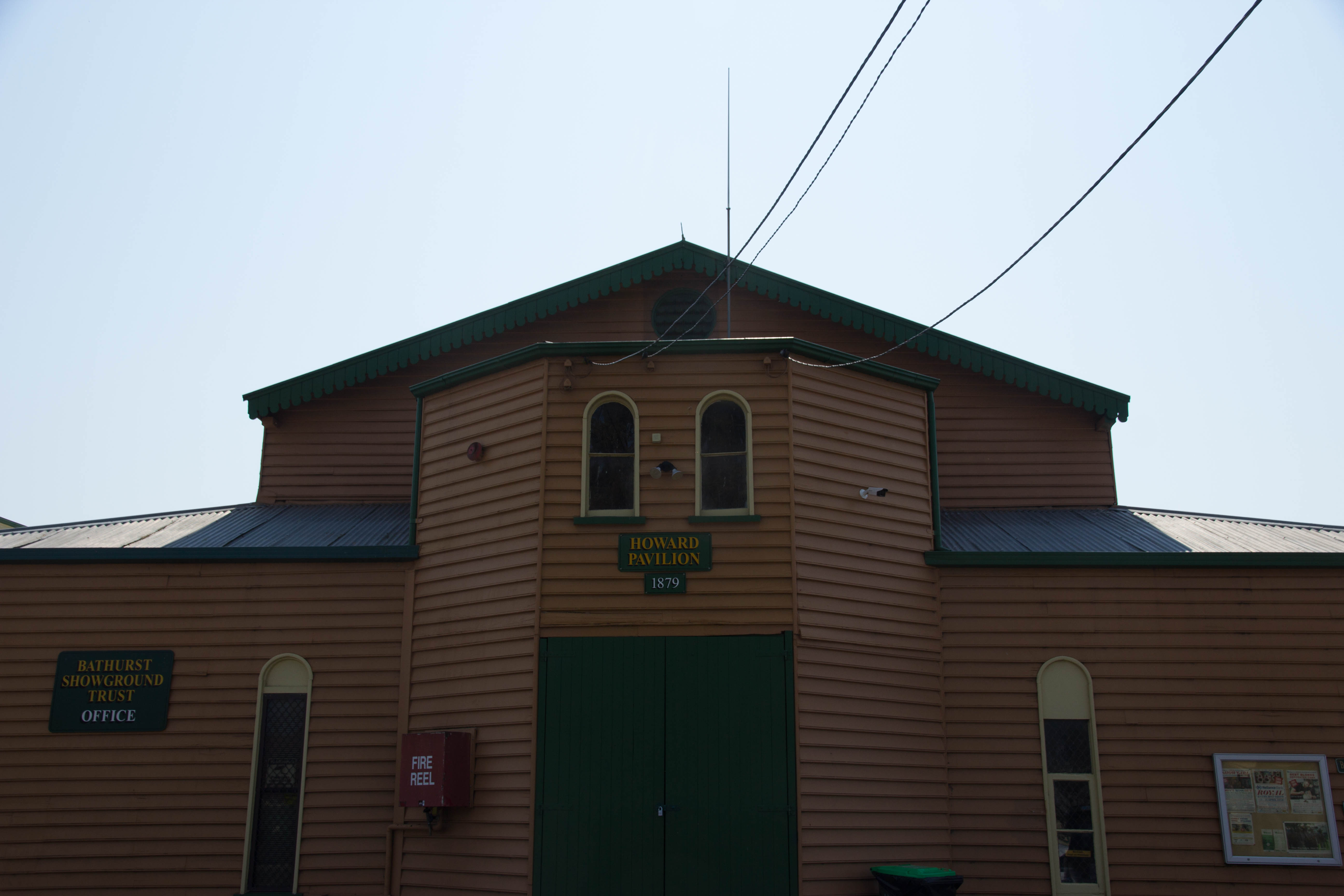
The Howard Pavilion, erected in 1879.

This was the first major building to appear at the showground. It was erected in 1879 as the "Exhibition Building", to the design of Edward Gell, Architect. By 1891 the building was known as the main pavilion. The pavilion was named in about 1957, for James Howard, who was made a life member of the AH & P in 1948 and who, with his son Sidney, gave long service to both the AH & P and the Trotting Club, principally as race starters.

This building is built hard against the east wall of the Trevitt Pavilion. It is timber framed and of basilican form nine bays long, composed or round log posts supporting the trusses of the gabled "nave", with clerestory windows on the east and west sides, above skillion-roofed aisles which extend at the sides and front at the same pitch as the main roof. At the south end there is a semi-octagonal full-height apse, incorporating the entrance door, flanked by rooms under the skillion roof, which is hipped at the south-east and south-west corners.

Walls are generally sheeted with beaded weatherboards. The apse has a facetted roof, a pair of round-headed windows and a large entrance doorway.

The windows of the clerestories are round-headed. The south or front gable has a large circular vent. The roof ridge is decorated with cast iron cresting. The barges at the northern end are unusual, being formed of short vertical boards with rounded ends.

More than half of the interior is open, revealing the form and detail of the robust structure.

==== The CEC English Pavilion ====
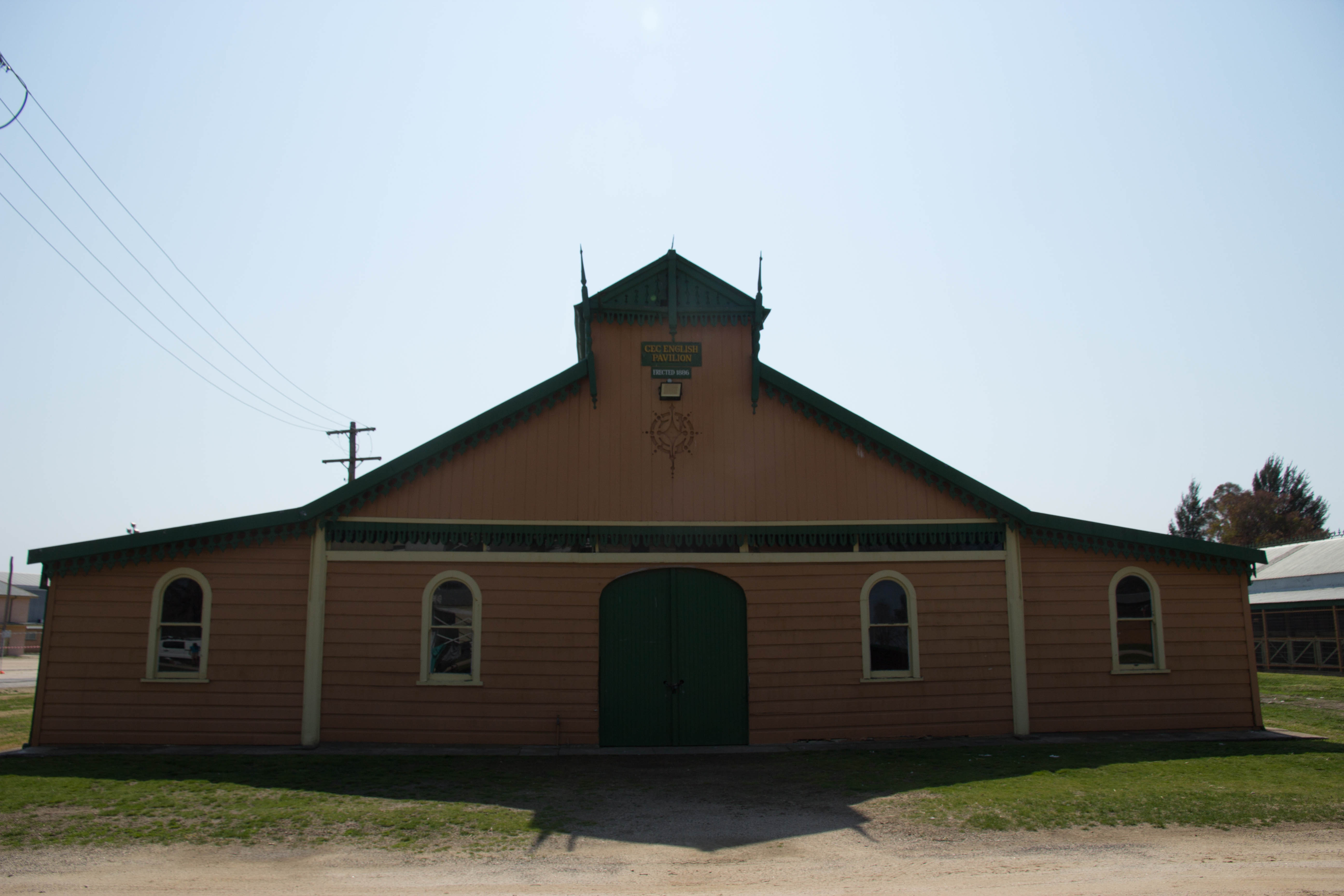
The CEC English Pavilion, erected 1886.

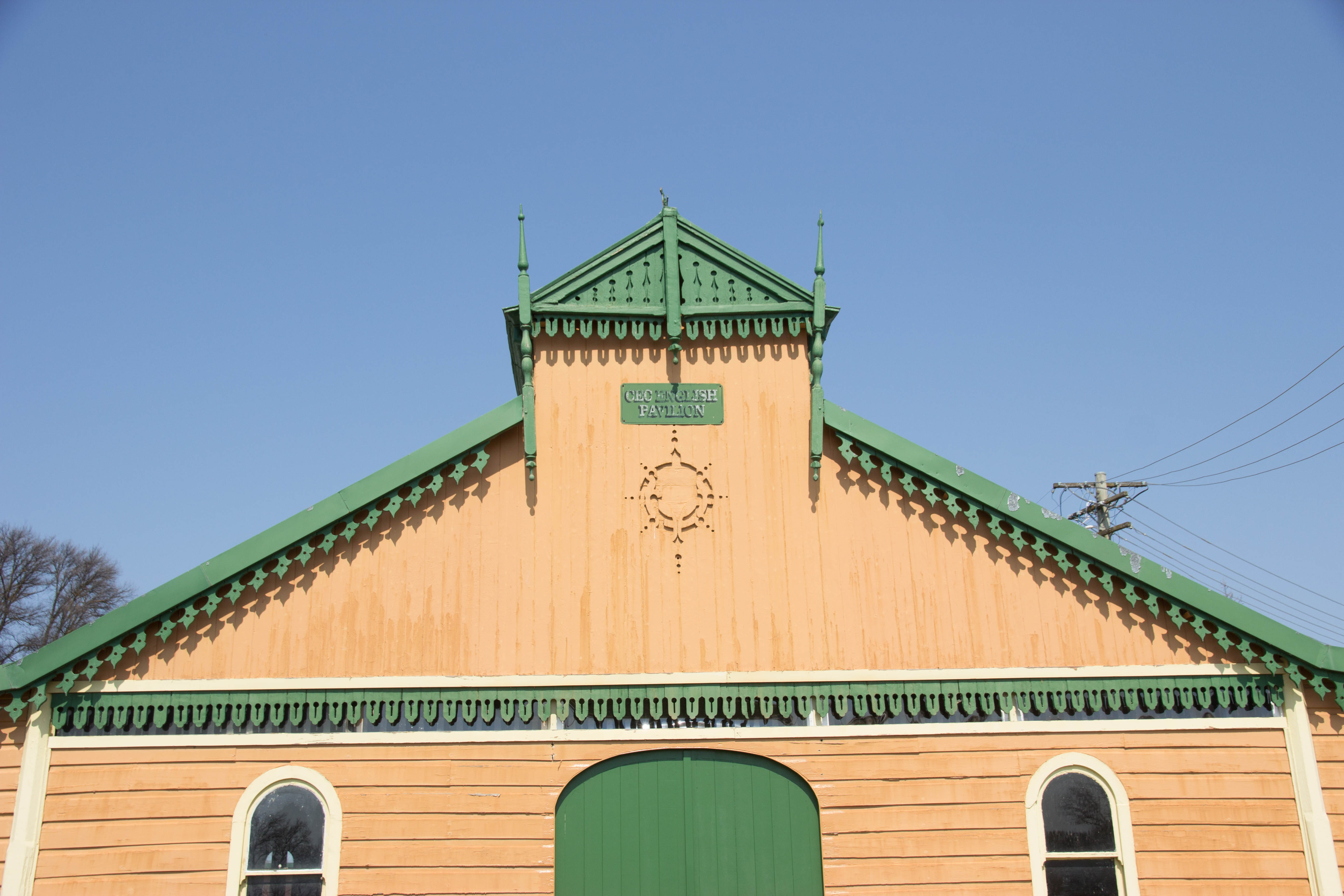
Detail of the northern facade of The CEC English Pavilion.

A painted panel on the front bears the date 1886. The design is of the Bathurst architect James Hine. C. E. C. English was a long-serving steward of the Show and the pavilion was named for him after 1967. This is a freestanding traditional timber framed structure with medium-pitched roof gables facing north and south, skillion aisles of lower pitch on the east and west sides, and a monitor roof light running north-south above the centre of the space. The building has six structural bays. The queen-post roof trusses are constructed of sawn timbers. The floor is concrete. The roofs are of corrugated iron and some translucent panels have been inserted.

The very handsome exterior is unusual in having virtually identical north and south elevations and unadorned sidewalls. The north and south ends feature the roof monitor, which is given ingenious pediment treatment by means of decorative fretwork timber boarding. The main gables are sheeted with vertical boarding and the walls with weatherboards of various profiles including rebated rusticated, bull nose and chamferboard. A fretwork valence appears in each main gable below the monitor ends. Each end elevation has a centre doorway with double doors and a semi-elliptical head, and four semicircular-headed double-hung windows.

==== Sinclair Pavilion ====
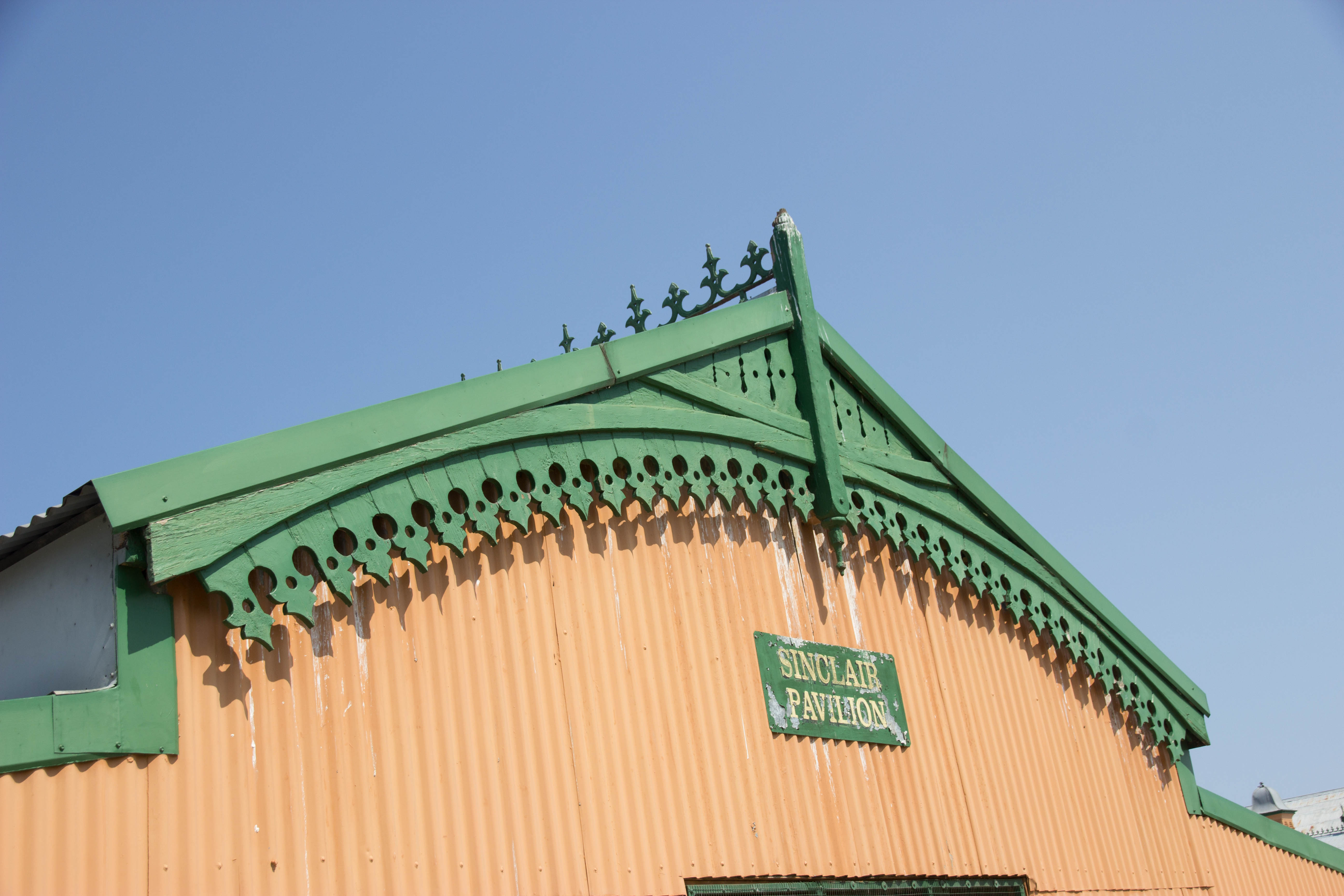
Detail of the decorative northern gable of the Sinclair Pavilion.

This is the second major building to be built at the showground. It was in place in time for the 1883 show. Its function was to provide for the exhibits in the sheep sections, for which it had 150 pens.

The building was named after 1967 to commemorate the name of a long-serving and dedicated steward of the Show. It still serves its original purpose.

This building is comparatively long and narrow, with its axis running north south, and it comprises a gabled main section having a fairly low-pitched roof, to which wide skillion side appendages of low roof pitch have been added, possibly at some time after erection of the main section.

The roof is of corrugated iron. The floor is of gravel and there is a concrete perimeter. The north and south walls are sheeted in corrugated iron.

On the exterior, the north end has a decorative gable treatment incorporating chambered bargeboards, a collar-tie, a curved member extending from eaves to collar, a central finial post, and a valence of fretwork boarding suspended from the curved member. The spandrels are filled with boarding. The finial acts as a stop-end to the cast iron cresting, which embellishes the roof.

==== The Don Leitch Pavilion ====
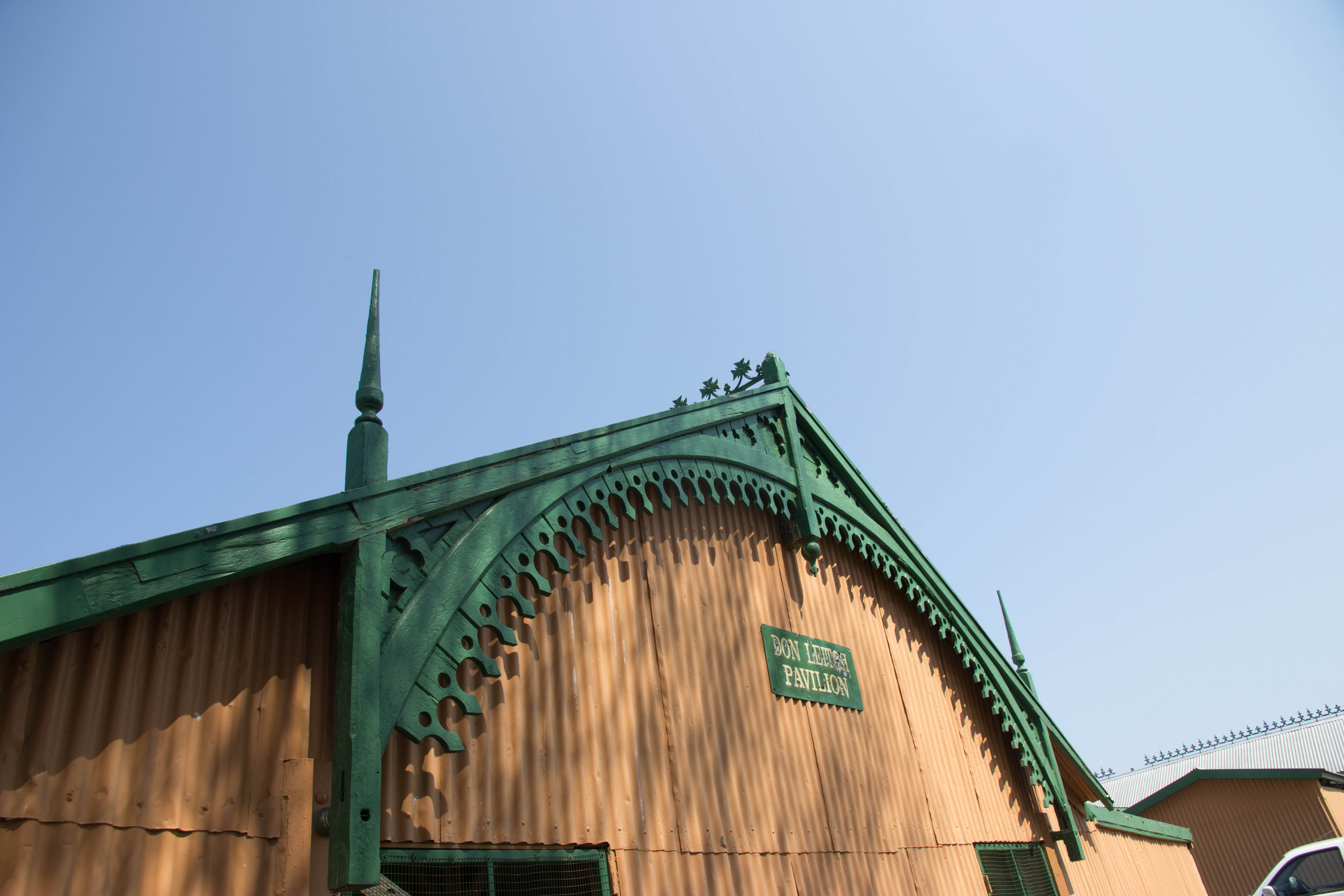
Detail of the decorative northern gable of The Don Leitch Pavilion.

This building was designed by James Hine, architect, and built in 1885 by Mugridge Brothers. The building was first used as a pig pavilion, it quickly earned the nickname of "The Palace". This was presumably because of the distinctive decorative treatment of the curved gable ends and the roof ridge.

The pavilion was named after 1967 to commemorate the service of Don Leitch, a long-serving steward and President of the AH & P Society from 1978-1983.

The Leitch Pavilion is a rectangular building ten bays long, its principal structural bays separated by stout round-log posts, which appear to mark the original perimeter of the space. To this main area are added side skillions of very low pitch. The roof is of broken-back form, sheeted with corrugated iron with some translucent plastic panels.

The floor and the surrounding apron are of gravel.

The exterior end walls are sheeted in corrugated iron and the sides have welded steel mesh and bird wire fixed to steel girders. The gable treatment of the centre section is quite distinctive.

==== Prior Pavilion ====
Simple unpretentious pavilion with classical rural character built 1952. Traditional form and construction blends well with the older buildings. Timber framed, partly open and partly vertical boarded under a broad gabled iron roof with flanking skillions. Roof is supported by undressed poles. The pavilion differs significantly from the traditional pavilion form, probably as a result of scarce steel supplies in the postwar period.

==== Cattle Pens A ====
A long, narrow structure of 14 bays, constructed of rough-hewn timber clad with corrugated iron in 1914. One side is fully open except for removable split hardwood rails mortised into split hardwood posts. Roof is a long, narrow gabled form supported by undressed hardwood poles. Representative of the simple structures built to display livestock. Simpler compared to other surrounding structures, it although makes a contribution to the rural flavor of the showground group, demonstrating an Australian type of construction, now almost a forgotten art.

==== Noel Moxon Stand ====
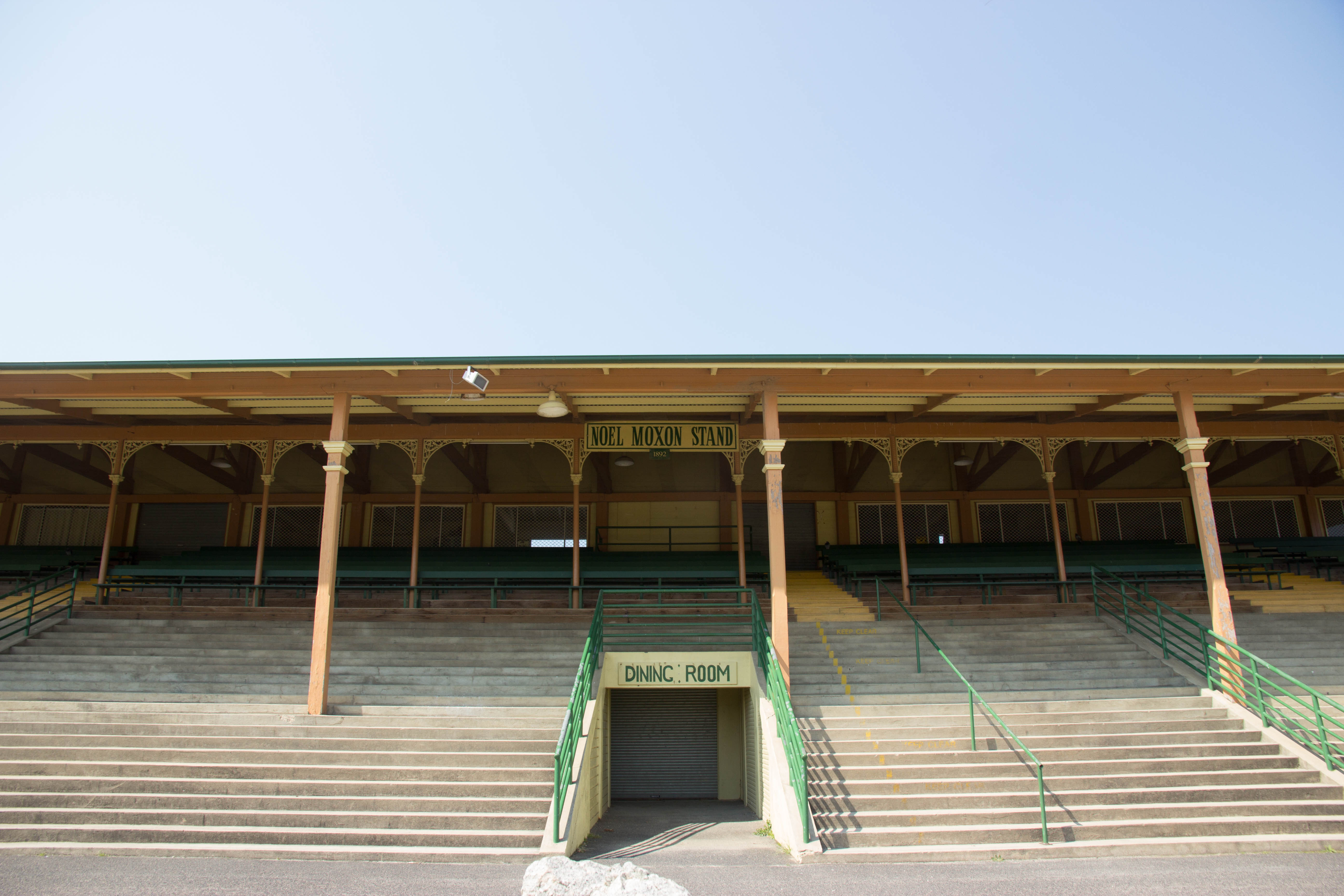
The Noel Moxon Stand, erected 1892.

In July 1891 the association were offered the grandstand and skating rink from the Ashfield Recreation Ground and Garden Palace, who had gone into receivership due to the depression. The grandstand was bought and relocated for a cost of £1,095. The Grandstand was ready for the show of 1892.

Late Victorian grandstand with timber-framed roof structure above a raking stepped concrete base. Cladding is part corrugated iron, part weatherboard under a gabled roof supported by square timber stop chamfered posts with attached mouldings. Some vestiges of timberwork and decorative iron remain but much has been removed. Iron railings to steps. The stand was named in the 20th Century after longtime Showground caretaker, Noel Moxon.

==== Gatekeeper's Lodge ====
The cottage bears the date 1885 in a panel in the frieze over the keystone motif of the ground-floor windows. It was erected in that year by Mugridge Bothers, builders, to the design of Bathurst architect James Hine. With its very compact plan, vertically oriented form, romantic silhouette and modest polychrome brickwork, it has the character of a design derived from the 19th-century pattern-book, but no such source has yet been identified. Gas lighting was installed in the house in 1914.

One of the most historic buildings at the ground, whose pattern-book design and brick construction give it a unique distinctiveness on this site. The romantic silhouette is created by a vertically oriented form, accompanied by modest polychrome brickwork. The floor plan is essentially a T-shape, two storeys with load bearing walls, timber joinery with sheet metal tiles simulating a Marseilles pattern. The main, south, wing is facetted as a semi-octagon, with a hipped and facetted roof, terminating with a prominent wrought iron finial. The building is the work of an important Bathurst architect, James Hines. The aesthetic impact of the building has been reduced by the construction of a 1970s toilet block nearby.

==== Outdoor Bar ====
Originally described as two "strong, substantial booths...walled with tongued and grooved pine, roofed with corrugated iron...intended as luncheon rooms with space at one end for a bar", the remaining one has had its walls removed. The building of four bays, supported on wooden posts, some encased in concrete, is in bad condition.

==== The Arena ====
The arena is approximately 300 metres (980 ft) long and 120 metres (390 ft) wide, on a NNE-SSW axis. The gravel track is 18 metres (59 ft) wide and 810 metres (2,660 ft) in circumference. Surrounded by elms, the grassed arena is a significant aspect of the showground landscape.

The arena has been an integral and highly important component of the Showground since 1888. The trotting track reached its oval form in 1890 and more extensive tree planting commenced.

The arena has been the focus of showground activity ever since it was created, featuring not only equestrian and other competitive events, but demonstrations such as the first aeroplane flight to be seen in the central west, by "Wizard" Stone in 1912.

Trotting races have been popular events at the show since 1889, when the first track was formed. The first meeting of the Bathurst Trotting Club was held in 1910.

Trotting activities, suspended during World War Two, recommenced in 1946 and night trotting commenced at the end of 1953, when light standards were installed around the track.

== Heritage listing ==
The Bathurst Showground is of state significance for its association with the larger agricultural region which contributed significantly to the economy and development of the state. The Bathurst Show became recognised as one of the best agricultural shows in NSW in regards to the quality of the livestock and exhibits, demonstrating both the success of farming in the region and the pride locals took in their produce and show.

The showground demonstrates a continuity of historical activity, the site being used continually as a showground since 1878. This is one of the earliest sites that has been used continuously and has some of the earliest extant showground buildings including the Howard Pavilion which was designed by Edward Gell and erected in 1879. Additionally, the showground is of high architectural merit with particular care being taken with the placement of buildings and the architectural styles in which they were built. This attention was extended to the landscape setting, thereby creating a landmark in the town of Bathurst and the region. The Bathurst showground along with Glen Innes, Singleton Showgrounds contains the most comprehensive array and aesthetically cohesive suite of showground buildings in NSW regional towns and is thus one of a small group of iconic or'ideal' country show grounds.

The site serves as a notable example of an agricultural showground, acting as a hub for rural communities and supporting regional social, technical, and economic development. Its long-running events have drawn visitors from across the region, making it a key representative of historic country showgrounds due to its architectural preservation and longevity.

Bathurst Showground was listed on the New South Wales State Heritage Register on 4 September 2015 having satisfied the following criteria.

The place is important in demonstrating the course, or pattern, of cultural or natural history in New South Wales.

The Bathurst Showground is of state significance for its association with the larger agricultural region which contributed significantly to the economy and development of the state. The Bathurst district was the first agricultural region to be developed inland of the Blue Mountains and provided significant pasture land. In the nineteenth century the region became a significant commercial orchard district for the provision of Sydney markets and the canning industry.

The Bathurst Show became recognized as a major regional agricultural event in New South Wales regards to the quality of the livestock and exhibits, demonstrating the region's agricultural history. The event provides an opportunity for regional farmers to showcase their produce and highlight the importance of their production to the wider community. The care given to the buildings and grounds has contributed to the Bathurst Show being placed within the top ten shows in New South Wales.

The Bathurst Showground is significant as the location of the first aeroplane flight in the central west region and the first display of a motor vehicle. The Bathurst Royal Show was the means by which many regional people gained access to a wide range of new technologies.

The Bathurst Showground is of state significance as it demonstrates a continuity of historical activity, the site being used continually as a showground since 1878. This is one of the earliest sites that has been used continuously and has some of the earliest extant showground buildings.

The place is important in demonstrating aesthetic characteristics and/or a high degree of creative or technical achievement in New South Wales.

The Bathurst Showground is of state significance as a showground of high architectural merit. Even from the earliest years of its development, care was taken with the placement of buildings and the architectural styles in which they were built. Prominent local architects were consulted or employed to design the majority of the buildings, including the Cattle Pens. This care was extended to the landscape setting, which architect Edward Gell was paid the significant sum of 50 pounds for his advice. The aesthetic effect of the careful planting of a range of exotic trees on the grounds is heightened its situation on the confluence of Vale Creek and the Macquarie River. The attention to design and layout of the showground has resulted in Bathurst showground being one of a small group of showgrounds in NSW containing a comprehensive array of aesthetically cohesive showbuildings which remain intact and in use for show purposes. Its aesthetic values make it a landmark in the town of Bathurst and the wider region.

The place has strong or special association with a particular community or cultural group in New South Wales for social, cultural or spiritual reasons.

The Bathurst Showground is of state significance as an example of an agricultural showground that has become a focus for rural communities. The Bathurst Showground is a representation of this rural establishment, having attracted people from a wide geographical area, including Sydney, Lithgow, Orange, Portland and further afield, thereby widening the significance of the showground. The show was a significant social event for many who took advantage of the cheap rail tickets to visit the show and it was recognised as "a great occasion for those who live on the outskirts of the district, as it offers them an excuse for a days rest and a chance to meet old friends".

The place possesses uncommon, rare or endangered aspects of the cultural or natural history of New South Wales.

The Bathurst Showground is of state heritage significance one of a small number of a showgrounds with a full complement of showground buildings demonstrating the breadth of activities associated with a regional show and the development of the show as the agricultural economy of the region developed.

The collection of buildings in their landscape setting is also rare as they are still intact and unaltered. Many other NSW showgrounds have retained their grandstands and in some cases a couple of other pavilions but many of the historic pavilions are either demolished or in a state of dilapidation. Along with Singleton, Maitland and Glen Innes, Bathurst Showground retains a diverse collection of buildings and has strived to ensure new buildings are largely sympathetic with the historic buildings. Glen Innes is a rare example of an aesthetically cohesive group of showground buildings in a carefully planned and maintained landscape setting.

The place is important in demonstrating the principal characteristics of a class of cultural or natural places/environments in New South Wales.

The site provides an intact example of a regional agricultural showground, demonstrating the role such venues played in the social and technological development of rural communities. The Bathurst Showground is distinguished by its architectural preservation, continuous use, and central arena layout.
