= Tongarra =

- Suburb
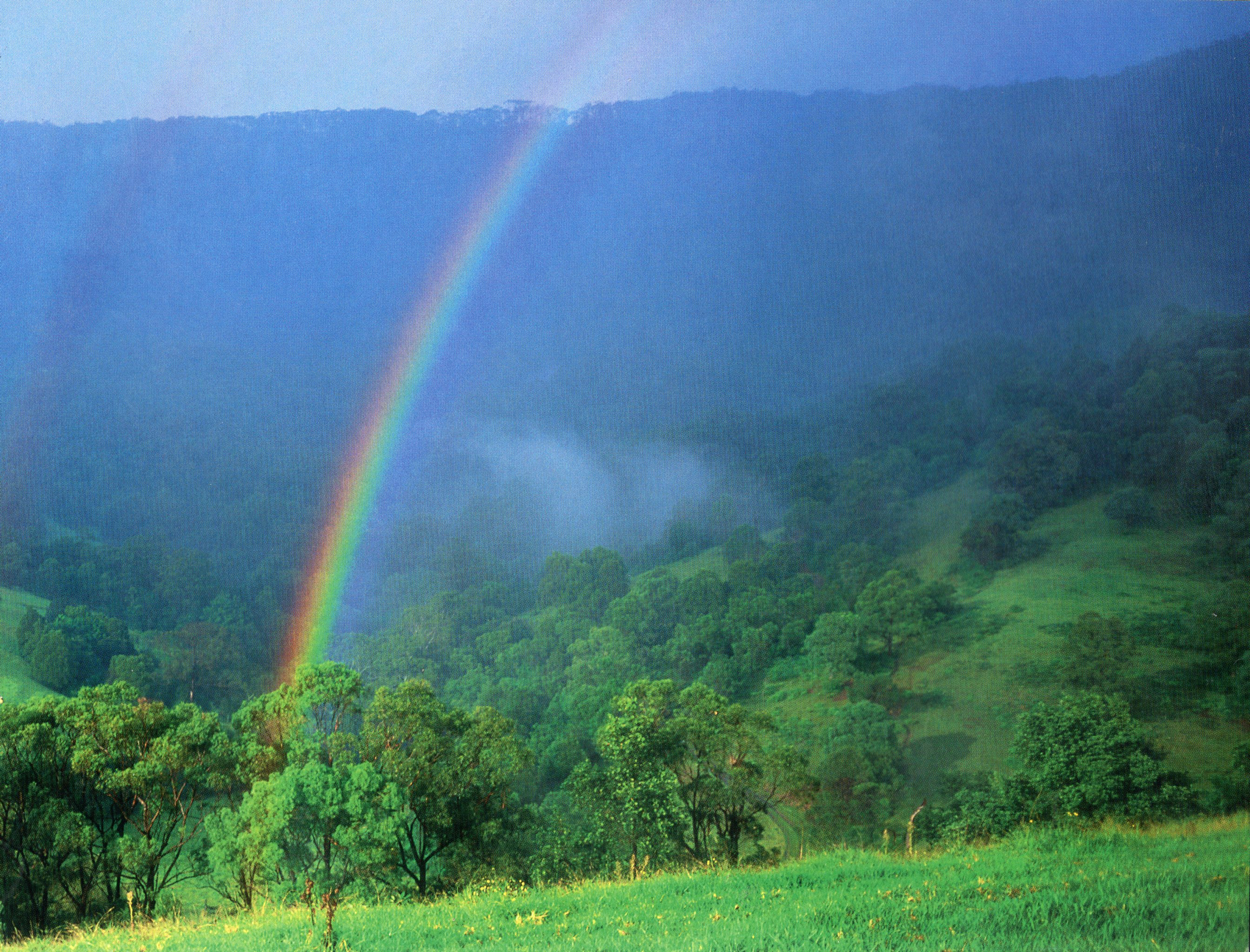

- Coordinates: 34°34′48″S 150°42′05″E
- Country: Australia
- State: New South Wales
- City: Illawarra
- LGA: City of Shellharbour
- Location: 37 km (23 mi) E of Bowral; 27 km (17 mi) WNW of Kiama; 30 km (19 mi) WSW of Wollongong; 121 km (75 mi) SSW of Sydney

Government
  - State electorate: Kiama
  - Federal division: Whitlam
- Elevation: 55 m (180 ft)

Population
  - Total: 141 (2021 census)
- Postcode: 2527
Suburbs around Tongarra
Mount Murray	Marshall Mount	Calderwood
Macquarie Pass	Tongarra	Tullimbar
Knights Hill	Knights Hill	Yellow Rock

Tongarra is a rural locality located in the Shellharbour LGA, west of Albion Park. It remains untouched from urban development. At the 2021 census, it had a population of 141.
