= Haywards Bay =

- Suburb
- Coordinates: 34°32′45″S 150°47′37″E
- Country: Australia
- State: New South Wales
- Region: Illawarra
- City: Wollongong
- LGA: City of Wollongong

Government
  - State electorate: Shellharbour
  - Federal division: Whitlam

Population
  - Total: 1,280 (2021 census)
- Postcode: 2530
- County: Camden
- Parish: Calderwood
Suburbs around Haywards Bay
	Dapto
Yallah	Haywards Bay	Lake Illawarra
	Albion Park Rail

Haywards Bay is a suburb of the City of Wollongong to the south of Dapto. At the 2021 census, it had a population of 1,280.
