= Albion Park Rail =

Suburb of New South Wales, Australia

- Suburb
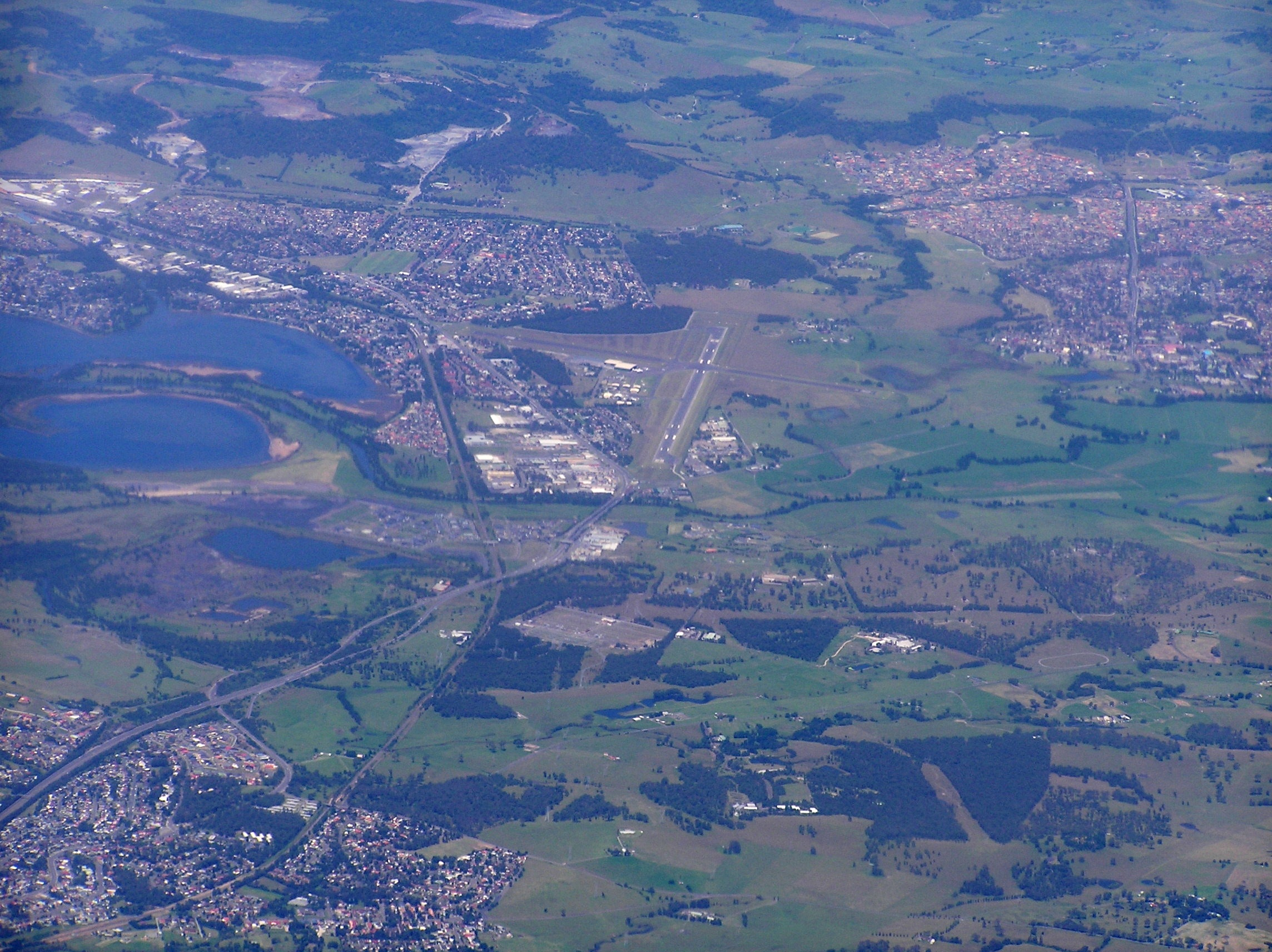
- Albion Park Rail is on the top left of this aerial photo, with Albion Park on the right

- Interactive map of Albion Park Rail
- Coordinates: 34°34′S 150°47.5′E
- Country: Australia
- State: New South Wales
- Region: Illawarra
- City: City of Shellharbour
- LGA: City of Shellharbour

Government
  - State electorate: Kiama, Shellharbour
  - Federal division: Whitlam
- Elevation: 8 m (26 ft)

Population
  - Total: 6,920 (SAL 2021)
- Postcode: 2527
- County: Camden
- Parish: Terragong
- Mean max temp: 22.6 °C (72.7 °F)
- Mean min temp: 11.7 °C (53.1 °F)
- Annual rainfall: 1,026.2 mm (40.40 in)
Suburbs around Albion Park Rail
Marshall Mount	Yallah	Haywards Bay
Calderwood	Albion Park Rail	Oak Flats
Albion Park	Croom	Dunmore

Albion Park Rail is a suburb of Shellharbour, Australia situated in the Macquarie Valley (Shellharbour). The South Coast railway line was opened to the railway station and Bombo in 1887. At the time the nearest town was Albion Park, several kilometres away. Over time, houses were built around the railway station, and Albion Park Rail developed into a town in its own right, and with its own name.

Albion Park Rail has a community area set up with a community centre, playing fields and a recently built skatepark. It only has one school but it accommodates many students from Pre-School to Year 6. Albion Park Rail is located along the shores of Lake Illawarra, near Koona Bay. It is a fifteen-minute drive on the freeway to Wollongong.

Albion Park Rail is the site of the Illawarra Regional Airport which is the location of the Historical Aircraft Restoration Society.

== Heritage listings ==
Albion Park Rail has a number of heritage-listed sites, including:

- Princes Highway: Albion Park railway station

== Museum ==
The Illawarra Light Railway Museum located just south of the airport is dedicated to the preservation and display of historic light railway locomotives and rolling stock. It holds regular open days featuring light and miniature train rides.

== Geography ==
=== Climate ===
Albion Park Rail experiences a humid subtropical climate bordering on an oceanic climate (Köppen: Cfa/Cfb) with very warm, wetter summers and quite mild, drier winters. The wettest recorded day was 22 March 2011 with 249.0 mm (9.80 in) of rainfall. Extreme temperatures ranged from 45.8 °C (114.4 °F) on 18 January 2013 to −2.0 °C (28.4 °F) on 15 June 2006 and 9 August 2009

Climate data has been recorded at the Illawarra Regional Airport since 1998.

Climate data for Albion Park (Shellharbour Airport) (34.56°S 150.79°E) (8 m (26 ft) AMSL) (1999-2025)
Month	Jan	Feb	Mar	Apr	May	Jun	Jul	Aug	Sep	Oct	Nov	Dec	Year
Record high °C (°F)	45.8 (114.4)	41.0 (105.8)	39.6 (103.3)	34.8 (94.6)	28.0 (82.4)	25.0 (77.0)	28.0 (82.4)	29.4 (84.9)	35.1 (95.2)	38.0 (100.4)	41.8 (107.2)	43.4 (110.1)	45.8 (114.4)
Mean daily maximum °C (°F)	26.9 (80.4)	26.3 (79.3)	25.4 (77.7)	23.4 (74.1)	20.6 (69.1)	18.1 (64.6)	17.8 (64.0)	18.9 (66.0)	21.5 (70.7)	23.0 (73.4)	24.1 (75.4)	25.7 (78.3)	22.6 (72.8)
Mean daily minimum °C (°F)	17.2 (63.0)	17.2 (63.0)	15.8 (60.4)	12.3 (54.1)	9.1 (48.4)	7.3 (45.1)	6.5 (43.7)	6.8 (44.2)	8.6 (47.5)	11.1 (52.0)	13.6 (56.5)	15.3 (59.5)	11.7 (53.1)
Record low °C (°F)	8.6 (47.5)	9.7 (49.5)	5.0 (41.0)	2.0 (35.6)	−1.0 (30.2)	−2.0 (28.4)	−1.7 (28.9)	−2.0 (28.4)	0.6 (33.1)	1.0 (33.8)	4.5 (40.1)	6.1 (43.0)	−2.0 (28.4)
Average precipitation mm (inches)	83.3 (3.28)	145.1 (5.71)	149.1 (5.87)	81.9 (3.22)	77.6 (3.06)	84.5 (3.33)	74.0 (2.91)	64.7 (2.55)	48.2 (1.90)	70.4 (2.77)	86.4 (3.40)	67.4 (2.65)	1,026.2 (40.40)
Average precipitation days (≥ 0.2 mm)	11.7	12.0	13.3	11.0	8.8	9.7	7.6	8.3	8.2	10.2	11.9	11.0	123.7
Average afternoon relative humidity (%)	63	67	64	61	58	57	54	49	53	58	63	61	59
Average dew point °C (°F)	16.8 (62.2)	17.6 (63.7)	16.0 (60.8)	13.1 (55.6)	9.9 (49.8)	7.6 (45.7)	6.2 (43.2)	5.9 (42.6)	8.8 (47.8)	10.9 (51.6)	13.5 (56.3)	14.9 (58.8)	11.8 (53.2)
Source: Bureau of Meteorology (1999-2025)
