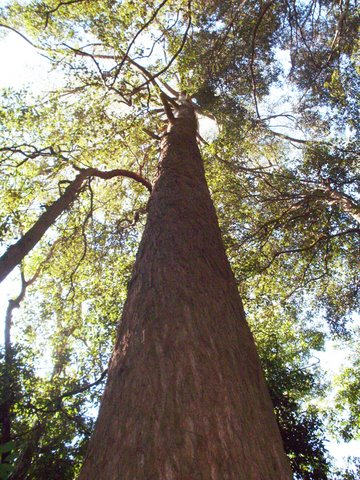
- 45 metre tall brown barrel at Macquarie Pass National Park

Scientific classification
- Kingdom: Plantae
- Clade: Embryophytes
- Clade: Tracheophytes
- Clade: Spermatophytes
- Clade: Angiosperms
- Clade: Eudicots
- Clade: Rosids
- Order: Myrtales
- Family: Myrtaceae
- Genus: Eucalyptus
- Species: E. fastigata

Binomial name
- Eucalyptus fastigata H.Deane & Maiden.

Synonyms
- Eucalyptus regnans var. fastigata (H.Deane & Maiden) Ewart

= Eucalyptus fastigata =

Brown barrel

Species of eucalyptus

Eucalyptus fastigata, commonly known as brown barrel or cut-tail, is a species of medium-sized to tall tree that is endemic to southeastern Australia. It has fibrous or stringy bark on the trunk and larger branches, smooth bark above, lance-shaped to curved adult leaves, flower buds in groups of eleven or more, white flowers and conical or pair-shaped fruit.

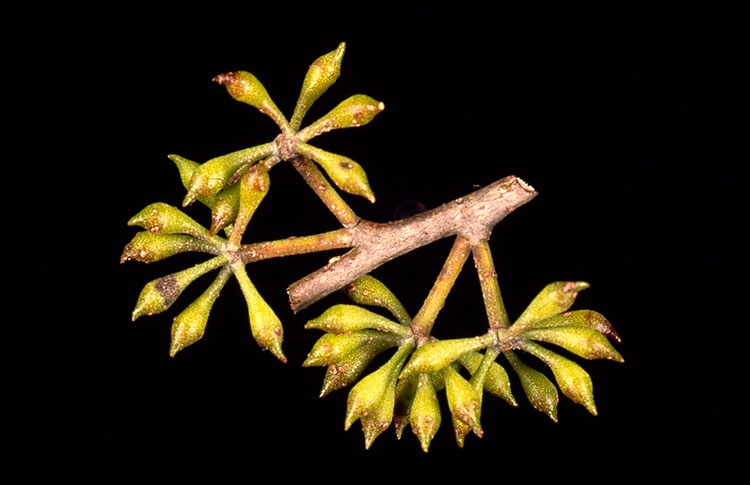
Flower buds

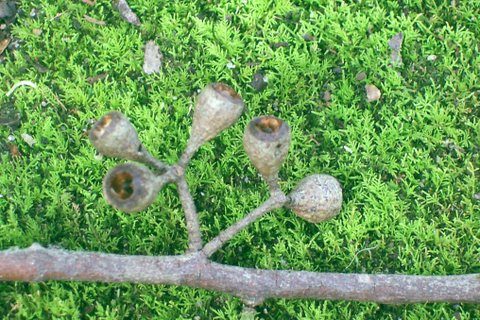
Fruit

== Description ==
Eucalyptus fastigata is typically a tall, straight tree that grows to a height of 45–60 m (148–197 ft) but does not form a lignotuber. It has rough, fibrous or stringy bark on the trunk and larger branches, smooth white to brown bark above which often hangs in strings in the crown. Young plants and coppice regrowth have petiolate, broadly elliptical to egg-shaped leaves 45–120 mm (1.8–4.7 in) long and 18–50 mm (0.71–1.97 in) wide. Adult leaves are more or less the same glossy green on both sides, lance-shaped to curved, 70–205 mm (2.8–8.1 in) long and 15–36 mm (0.59–1.42 in) wide on a petiole 10–17 mm (0.39–0.67 in) long. The flower buds are arranged in leaf axils in groups of eleven, thirteen fifteen or more, the groups often paired, on a peduncle 4–14 mm (0.16–0.55 in) long, the individual buds on pedicels 1–5 mm (0.039–0.197 in) long. Mature buds are oval or club-shaped, 3–6 mm (0.12–0.24 in) long and 2–3 mm (0.079–0.118 in) wide with a conical or rounded operculum. Flowering occurs between December and February and the flowers are white. The fruit is a woody conical or pear-shaped capsule, 5–9 mm (0.20–0.35 in) long and 4–8 mm (0.16–0.31 in) wide with the valves at about rim level.

Eucalyptus regnans is similar to E. fastigata but has rough bark only at the base of the trunk, smaller buds and fruit, and a wider distribution in Victoria.

== Taxonomy and naming ==
Eucalyptus fastigata was first formally described in 1897 by Henry Deane and Joseph Maiden in Proceedings of the Linnean Society of New South Wales. The specific epithet is from the Latin word (fastigatus) meaning "bring to a point" or "sharpen".

== Distribution and habitat ==
Brown barrel grows in tall open forest in valleys and on slopes between the Ebor district on the Northern Tablelands of New South Wales to the Errinundra Plateau in far north-eastern Victoria. It is widely planted in New Zealand.
