= Calderwood, New South Wales =

Calderwood New South Wales
- Coordinates: 34°33′27″S 150°44′32″E
- Population: 3,013 (SAL 2021)
- Postcode(s): 2527
- LGA(s): Shellharbour
- Region: Illawarra
- County: Camden
- Parish: Calderwood
- State electorate(s): Kiama
- Federal division(s): Whitlam
Suburbs around Calderwood:
	Marshall Mount	Yallah
Tullimbar	Calderwood	Albion Park Rail
Tongarra	Tullimbar	Albion Park

Calderwood is a suburb in the City of Shellharbour in New South Wales, Australia, lying to the northwest of Albion Park. At the 2021 census, Calderwood had a population of 3,013. It is currently undergoing suburban redevelopment through Lendlease.

== Population ==
At the 2021 census, there were 3,013 people in Calderwood, up from 173 at the 2016 census.

- The most common birth location was Australia (84.9%) followed by England (2.6%), India (1.9%), Philippines (1.3%), New Zealand (0.8%) and South Africa (0.5%).
- 88% of people only spoke English at home.
- The most common responses for religion were no religion (40.2%), Catholic (28.1%) and Anglican (12.8%).

== Education ==
There is currently one school in Calderwood:

- Calderwood Christian School

== Recreation ==
The main recreational attraction in Calderwood is the Calderwood Valley Golf Course, which has a total of 18 holes totaling 5091 metres.
