= Hoddles Cross Roads, New South Wales =

Coordinates: 34°34′54″S 150°15′04″E

Hoddles Crossroads is a locality in the Southern Highlands of New South Wales, Australia, in Wingecarribee Shire. It is located at the junction of the Hume Highway and Illawarra Highway. It was formerly known as The Cross Roads.
