= Macquarie Valley (Shellharbour) =

The Macquarie Valley, also known as Albion Park, Rural West or Western Valley, is an area located in the Shellharbour, a local government area in the Illawarra region of New South Wales, Australia.

The valley includes the towns of Albion Park Rail, Albion Park and Tullimbar, as well as the Macquarie Pass National Park.

== Description ==
The valley differs from other areas in Illawarra, as the escarpment heads inland forms several hills along with it, thus creating the area known as the Macquarie Valley. The area also experiences a greater range of temperature forecasts compared to other areas in Illawarra. The Macquarie Valley has had the Illawarra's hottest and coldest temperatures recorded and also experiences significant rainfall each year. It is also less populated compared to other areas in the LGA and Illawarra, with only roughly 20,000 people living in the valley, as compared to other areas in Shellharbour LGA.
