= Tullimbar =

- Suburb
- Coordinates: 34°34′33″S 150°44′07″E
- Country: Australia
- State: New South Wales
- Region: Illawarra
- City: Illawarra
- LGA: City of Shellharbour
- Location: 43 km (27 mi) E of Bowral; 21 km (13 mi) NW of Kiama; 24 km (15 mi) SSW of Wollongong; 115 km (71 mi) SSW of Sydney
- Established: 2016

Government
  - State electorate: Kiama
  - Federal division: Whitlam
- Elevation: 16 m (52 ft)

Population
  - Total: 1,840 (2021 census)
- Postcode: 2527
- County: Camden
- Parish: Jamberoo
Suburbs around Tullimbar
Calderwood	Calderwood	Calderwood
Tongarra	Tullimbar	Albion Park
Yellow Rock	Yellow Rock	Albion Park

Tullimbar is a suburb situated in the Macquarie Valley in the City of Shellharbour, New South Wales, Australia.

A store was in operation at Tullimbar in 1856 by Robert Wilson. A Post Office was established at Tullimbar in 1872. A school was opened at Tullimbar on 31 October 1881.

Tullimbar Public School, was built from Yellow Rock sandstone by a government contractor. It replaced the older Macquarie River School, with students transferring to the new hilltop location. It remained in operation until 1965, when it officially closed. In the 1970s, a severe bushfire swept through the Macquarie Valley, destroying the school building. Today, the stone ruins can still be seen within the grounds of the teachers’ residence gardens.
