= Marshall Mount =

- Suburb
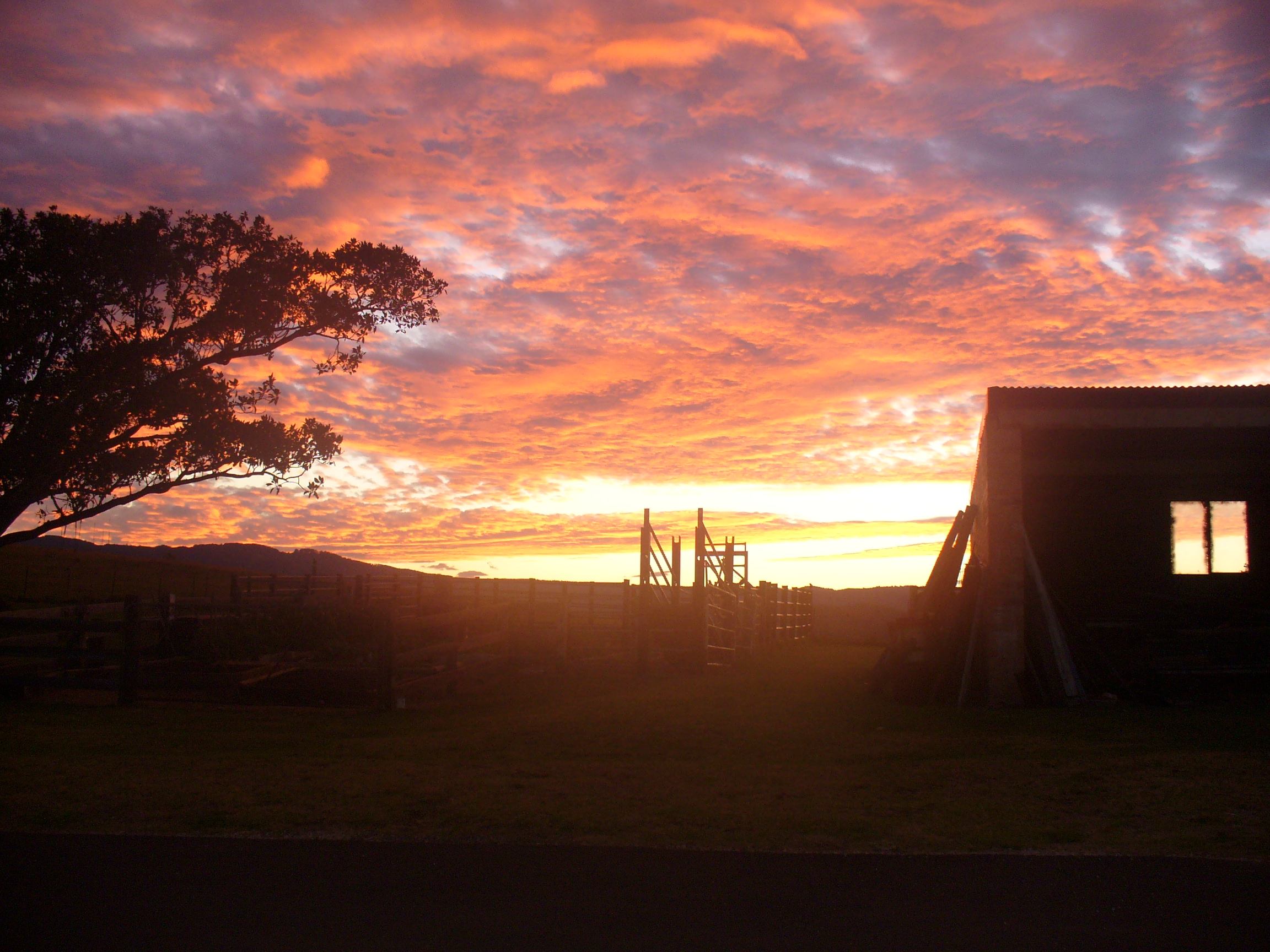
- Sunset at Marshall Mount

- Coordinates: 34°32′42″S 150°44′12″E
- Country: Australia
- State: New South Wales
- Region: Illawarra
- LGA: City of Wollongong
- Location: 4 km (2.5 mi) SW of Dapto; 2 km (1.2 mi) NNW of Albion Park
- Established: 1829

Government
  - State electorate: Kiama
  - Federal division: Whitlam

Population
  - Total: 177 (2021 census)
- Postcode: 2530
- County: Camden
- Parish: Calderwood
Suburbs around Marshall Mount
Avon	Avondale	Dapto
Avon	Marshall Mount	Yallah
Calderwood	Calderwood	Calderwood

Marshall Mount is a suburb of Wollongong in New South Wales, Australia. It is located between the larger centres of Dapto and Albion Park.

== History ==
In 1829 Henry Osborne, a wealthy Irish immigrant, was granted 2,560 acres (10.4 km^{2}) in the Dapto district known as Marshall Mount, where he settled with his wife Sarah Osborne (née Marshall) in 1833. By the 1840s Henry had added to his estate by securing Charles Throsby Smith's "Calderwood" 1,280 acres (5.2 km^{2}), Elyard's "Avondale", William Browne's "Athanlin" (Yallah), Brook's "Exmouth" and numerous smaller grants. Marshall Mount was expanded to reach from Mullet Creek in the north to the Macquarie Rivulet in the south.

In 1841, Marshall Mount House was completed as the Osborne's new residence and in 1843, Osborne held a cattle show at his property which led to the founding of the Illawarra Agricultural Association.

By the 1850s the Osbornes had become one of the most powerful families in the region, and in 1851 Henry Osborne was elected to the Legislative Council as member for East Camden, representing his constituency in the first Legislative Assembly. (McDonald, 1976; Dowd, B.T., 1960; Hagan, 1997.)

A school opened at Marshall Mount in 1859, and after the death of Henry Osborne in the same year, Marshall Mount road became a public thoroughfare. Marshall Mount remained primarily the property of Osborne's descendants until 1890, when Hamilton Osborne sold twenty-two lots of property to new owners.

Marshall Mount is an agricultural/rural district and it had a population of 142 at the 2016 census. Under the West Dapto Local Environmental Plan, Marshall Mount has been rezoned for residential development by the NSW State Government in 2018.

== Notable attractions ==
Marshall Mount is the site of the Marshall Mount Old Time Dance, a fortnightly gathering run by the Marshall Mount Progress Association.

The Marshall Mount Public School and Schoolmaster's Residence, opened in 1859, are still standing on Marshall Mount Road and offer an example of typical architectural style of the period.

Marshall Mount House, a colonial-style built on the original site of the Osborne residence, has been a heritage listed building since 1978, due to the significance of its original owner.
