= Macquarie Pass =

Section of highway in New South Wales, Australia

Coordinates: 34°34′S 150°40′E

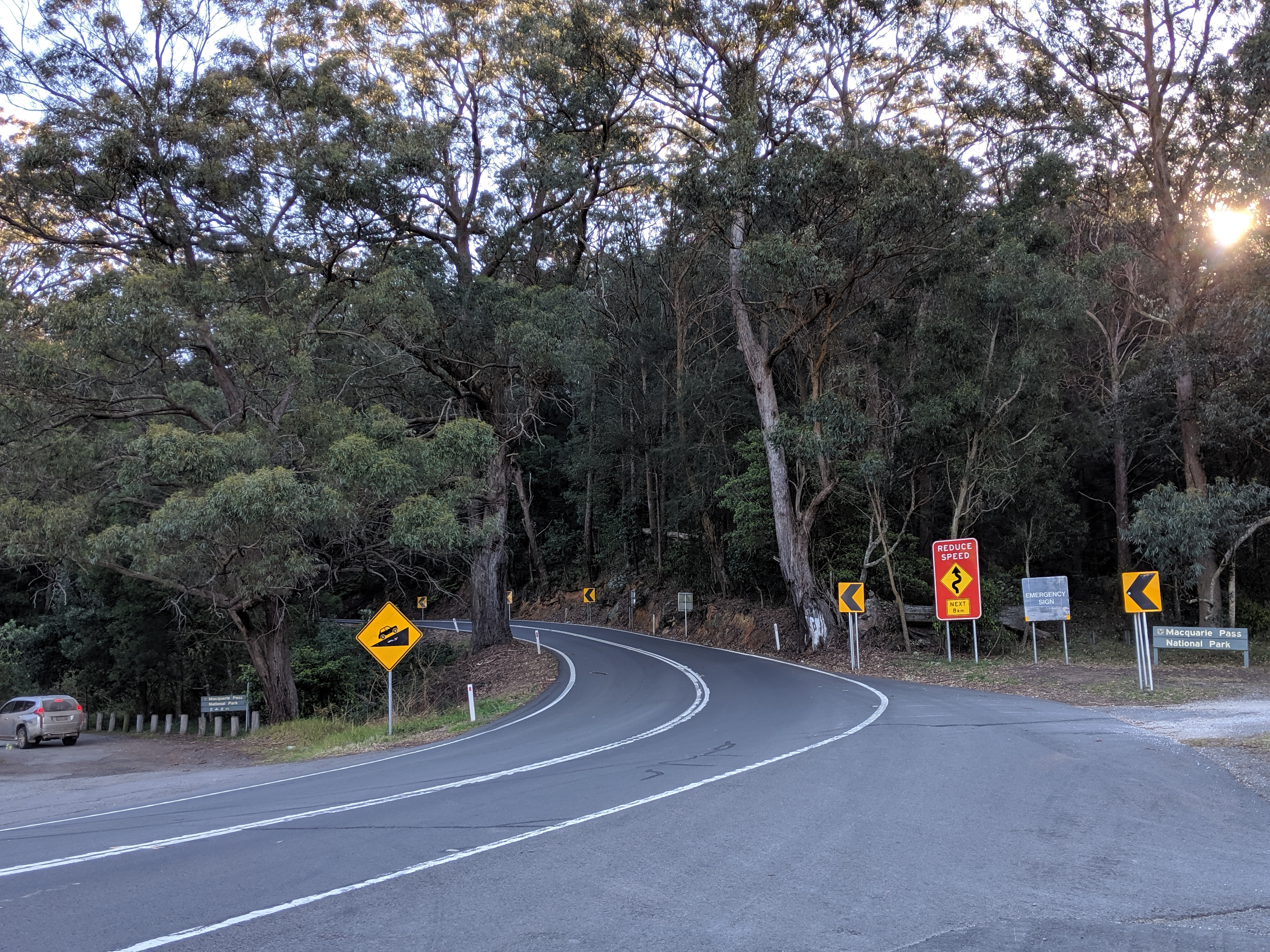
- Entry of Macquarie Pass

General information
- Type: Highway
- Length: 8 km (5.0 mi)
- Route number(s): A48
- Former route number: National Route 48 State Route 80

Highway system
- Highways in Australia; National Highway • Freeways in Australia

Macquarie Pass is an 8 km (5 mi) section of the Illawarra Highway, opened in 1898, passing through Macquarie Pass National Park.

Macquarie Pass links the Southern Highland town of Robertson to the coastal town of Albion Park, descending the Illawarra Escarpment via a very narrow bitumen roadway, which has several single-lane sections and is mostly two lanes with double "no overtaking" lines. It is in the Shellharbour local government area.

This section of roadway is very steep, and contains many hairpin bends, resulting in buses and trucks needing to reverse on some of the bends. The pass is quite notorious for accidents due to its nature, and drivers and riders are required to be cautious.

After heavy rain, the Macquarie Pass can be closed due to flooding on the top half of the pass. Cars and motorcycle riders may opt to use Jamberoo Mountain Road between Robertson and Jamberoo, while trucks are advised to use Mount Ousley Road (Southern Freeway) and Picton Road as an alternative.

The road is very popular with motorcyclists on weekends and public holidays. The Shellharbour and Wingecarribee Councils and Transport for NSW have therefore published a safety brochure entitled 'Motorcycling Macquarie Pass.'

== Caloola Pass proposal ==
During the 1980s, construction of an alternative roadway was proposed —ascending the Illawarra Escarpment from Albion Park to Robertson (adjacent to Yellow Rock). The proposal was not proceeded with.

== Future of Macquarie Pass ==
While debate continues as to whether the road should be closed to trucks (diverting all trucks bound for the Highlands and Canberra north to Mount Ousley), there is pressure from private developers for a new multi-lane highway over the escarpment to connect Shellharbour to the Highlands. However, residents of the Southern Highlands are strongly opposed to this, and neither state nor federal government has acted on the proposal.
