= Macquarie Pass National Park =

National park in Australia

- IUCN category II (national park)
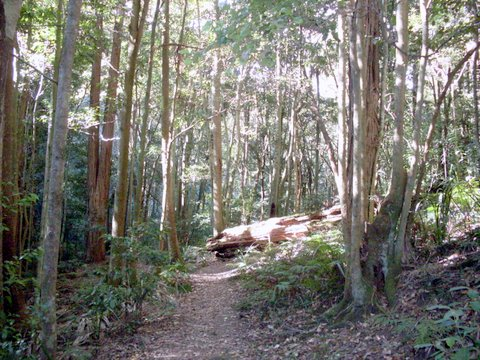
- Rainforest in the park

- Location within New South Wales
- Location: New South Wales
- Coordinates: 34°34′10″S 150°39′25″E
- Area: 11 km^{2} (4.2 sq mi)
- Established: 3 December 1969
- Governing body: National Parks and Wildlife Service (New South Wales)

Macquarie Pass National Park is a national park in New South Wales, Australia, 90 km southwest of Sydney. It is located around the pass of the same name, which is on the Illawarra Highway and part of the Illawarra escarpment.

Macquarie Pass National Park was established in 1970 and protects a range of eucalypt forests and rainforest, including one of Australia's most southerly stands of subtropical rainforest. The pass was opened in 1898 and has been a major route into and out of the Illawarra coastal plain ever since. There is a major power line running east–west through the park.

As well as a diverse array of birdlife, the park has swamp wallabies and wombats.

== History ==
The area was heavily logged for cedar in the first half of the 19th century.

== Facilities ==
Picnic facilities are provided at two sites at the bottom of Macquarie Pass. Barbecues are provided at two other picnic areas.

=== Walking tracks ===
The Macquarie Rivulet track is two kilometres long and easy to medium grade. A track goes along 30 metres to a parking area near a picnic area and rivulet. An old track continues on along the north side of the rivulet which is flat for several hundred metres, then becomes steeper, dropping back to the rivulet by a large boulder. Birds which may be seen here include dollarbird, azure kingfisher, sacred kingfisher, golden whistler, yellow-throated scrubwren, black-faced monarch and rufous fantail.

The Cascade Falls Walk is a one kilometre track, easy grade. It goes beside Cascade Creek at the base of Macquarie Pass to a small waterfall. Birds found here include green catbird, rose robin, red-browed finch, yellow-throated scrubwren, brown gerygone, Lewin's honeyeater, crimson rosella. Fungi are apparent here.

Clover Hill Road is a 3.5 kilometre track, easy grade. It follows a maintenance trail to Macquarie Rivulet and several waterfalls and a large boulder. The track goes to a parking area after 3 kilometres. The track then deteriorates near a Turpentine grove. It then comes to a dilapidated concrete causeway over the rivulet. Crossing it, it goes to Rainbow Falls and a balancing rock. The rock is about 50 metres tall and the waterfall is behind it. Birds here include white-throated treecreeper, large-billed gerygone, Bassian thrush, topknot pigeon, brown cuckoo-dove, wonga pigeon, Australian king parrot, grey goshawk, Lewin's honeyeater, and nocturnal spotlighting may produce a powerful or sooty owl.

The Glenview walk is a two kilometre track, easy grade. It goes through tall forest past power lines and eastwards, ceasing at the park boundary. Birds here include variegated fairy-wren, brush cuckoo, fan-tailed cuckoo, crested shrike-tit, golden bronze-cuckoo.

The Upper Cascade Creek Walk is a two kilometre track of moderate grade.

The Brown Barrel Walk is an easy to moderate grade track half a kilometre in length that goes from Nurrewin past power lines and through rainforest and moist eucalypt forest. Birds here include superb lyrebird, pilotbird, cicadabird, logrunner, rose robin, golden whistler, king parrot, topknot pigeon. Its name derives from Eucalyptus fastigata, or brown barrel.

The Mount Murray Road Track is a one and a half kilometre track of easy grade. It follows the powerline easement in a loop track. Birds include red-browed treecreeper, satin flycatcher, black-faced monarch and rufous fantails in late spring to autumn months.

== Locality ==
The locality of Macquarie Pass is defined as a suburb of the City of Shellharbour, "containing, more or less, the Macquarie Pass National Park, about 11 km west of Albion Park". At the 2021 census, it had no population.

== See also ==
- Protected areas of New South Wales
