= Albion Park =

- Suburb
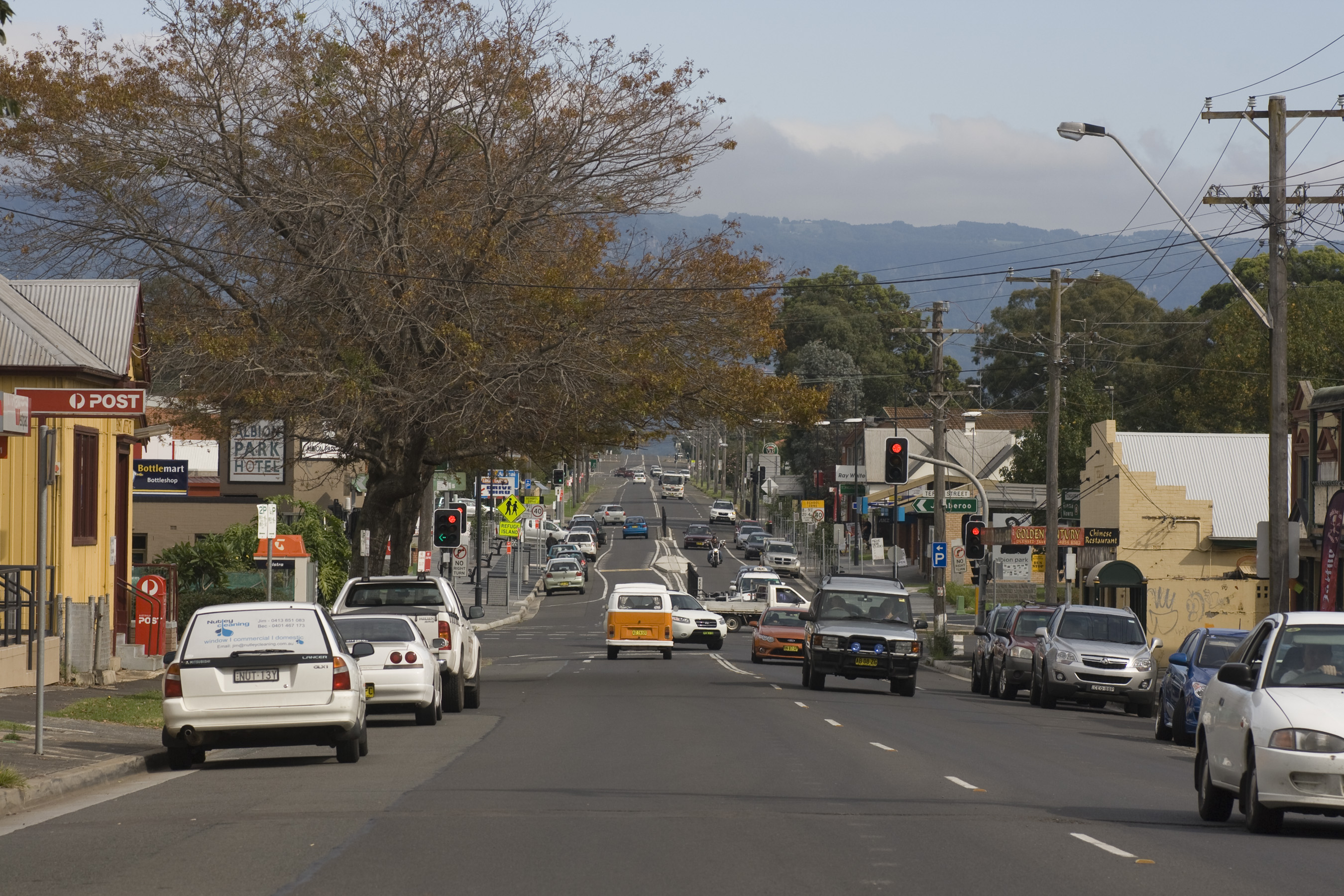
- Main Street

- Interactive map of Albion Park
- Coordinates: 34°34′S 150°48′E
- Country: Australia
- State: New South Wales
- Region: Illawarra
- City: Illawarra
- LGA: City of Shellharbour
- Location: 104 km (65 mi) south of Sydney; 18 km (11 mi) south of Wollongong

Government
  - State electorate: Kiama
  - Federal division: Whitlam

Population
  - Total: 13,826 (2021 census)
- Postcode: 2527
- County: Camden
- Parish: Jamberoo
Suburbs around Albion Park
| North Macquarie | Calderwood | Albion Park Rail |
| Tullimbar | Albion Park | Croom |
| Yellow Rock | Curramore | Croom |

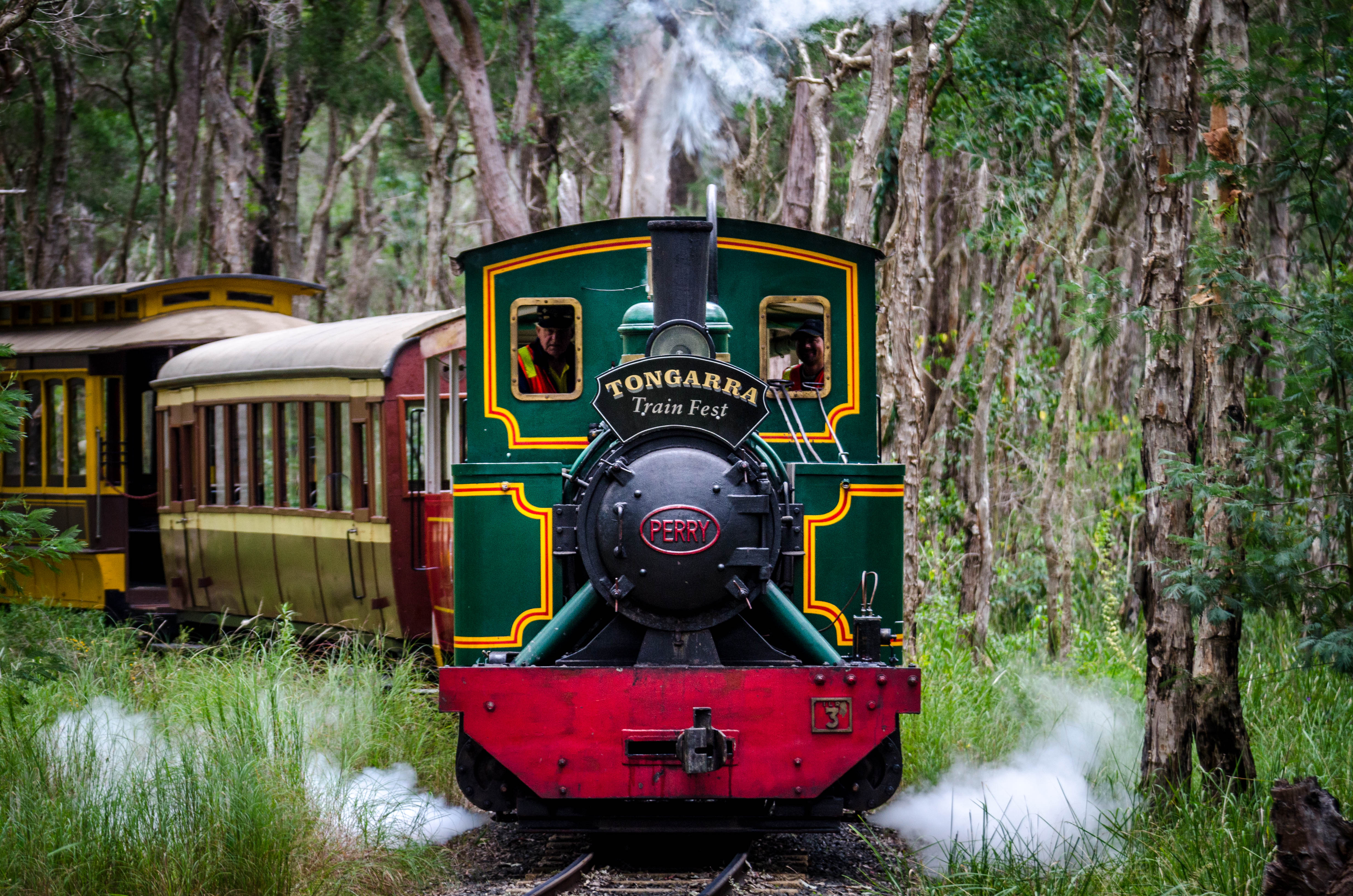
Tully Sugar Mill No.6 at Illawarra Light Railway Museum, Albion Park Rail

Albion Park is a suburb situated in the Macquarie Valley in the City of Shellharbour, which is in turn one of the three local government areas that comprise the Wollongong Metropolitan Area, New South Wales, Australia. Although it is surrounded by a 'green belt' of farms, Albion Park had a population of 13,316 as at the 2016 census.

The Illawarra escarpment is to the west, Dapto is to the north, Jamberoo is to the south and Shellharbour is to the east.

== History ==
On 9 January 1821 the area around Albion Park was part of a grant of land of over 2000 acres given to Samuel Terry, a former convict who became one of the richest men in New South Wales. Terry owned and operated the Terry's Meadows Estate, which operated as a cattle stud. In 1834, Terry suffered from a stroke and died in 1838.

The land was inherited by Samuel Terry's nephew, John Terry Hughes. Hughes renamed the site to Albion Park.

The township began to grow around the centre of the estate. For European settlers, this had been a natural meeting place as it was where the road from Wollongong in the north crossed the road from the timber industry in Calderwood and Tongarra in the west as it ran out towards the port at Shellharbour.

The arrival of the railway line in 1887, and the completion of the road through Macquarie Pass to the Southern Highlands hastened the town's growth.

== Heritage listings ==
Albion Park has a number of heritage-listed sites, including Toongla on Tullimbar Road.

== Etymology ==
The term "Albion" is an ancient name of Great Britain. The name was given to the area by John Terry Hughes after originally being known as the Terry's Meadow Estate.

== Population ==
According to the 2021 census of Population, there were 13,826 people in Albion Park.

- Aboriginal and Torres Strait Islander people made up 4.5% of the population.
- 84.1% of people were born in Australia. The next most common countries of birth were England 4.2%, New Zealand 0.8%, Scotland 0.6% and Germany 0.6%.
- 90.4% of people only spoke English at home.
- The most common responses for religion were No Religion 39.0%, Catholic 24.3%, and Anglican 17.2%.

== Infrastructure ==
=== Trains ===
In order to avoid the highest parts of the ridge between Albion Park and Minnamurra, the railway needed to keep closer to the shore of Lake Illawarra. After the opening of Albion Park railway station two kilometres to the east in 1887, a new town began to develop next to it, now known as Albion Park Rail.

=== Roads ===
The Illawarra Highway runs through Albion Park and joins the Princes Highway just north of the suburb. This road brings many people through the region. Albion Park is also on the most direct link between Jamberoo Action Park and Sydney via the Princes Motorway and thus is directly on the route for those travelling south.

== Education ==
There are currently 4 Primary Schools and 3 High Schools in Albion Park:

- Albion Park Public School
- Albion Park High School
- Mount Terry Public School
- St. Joseph's Catholic School, Albion Park
- St. Paul's Catholic Primary School, Albion Park
- Calderwood Christian School
- Tullimbar Public School

== Recreation ==
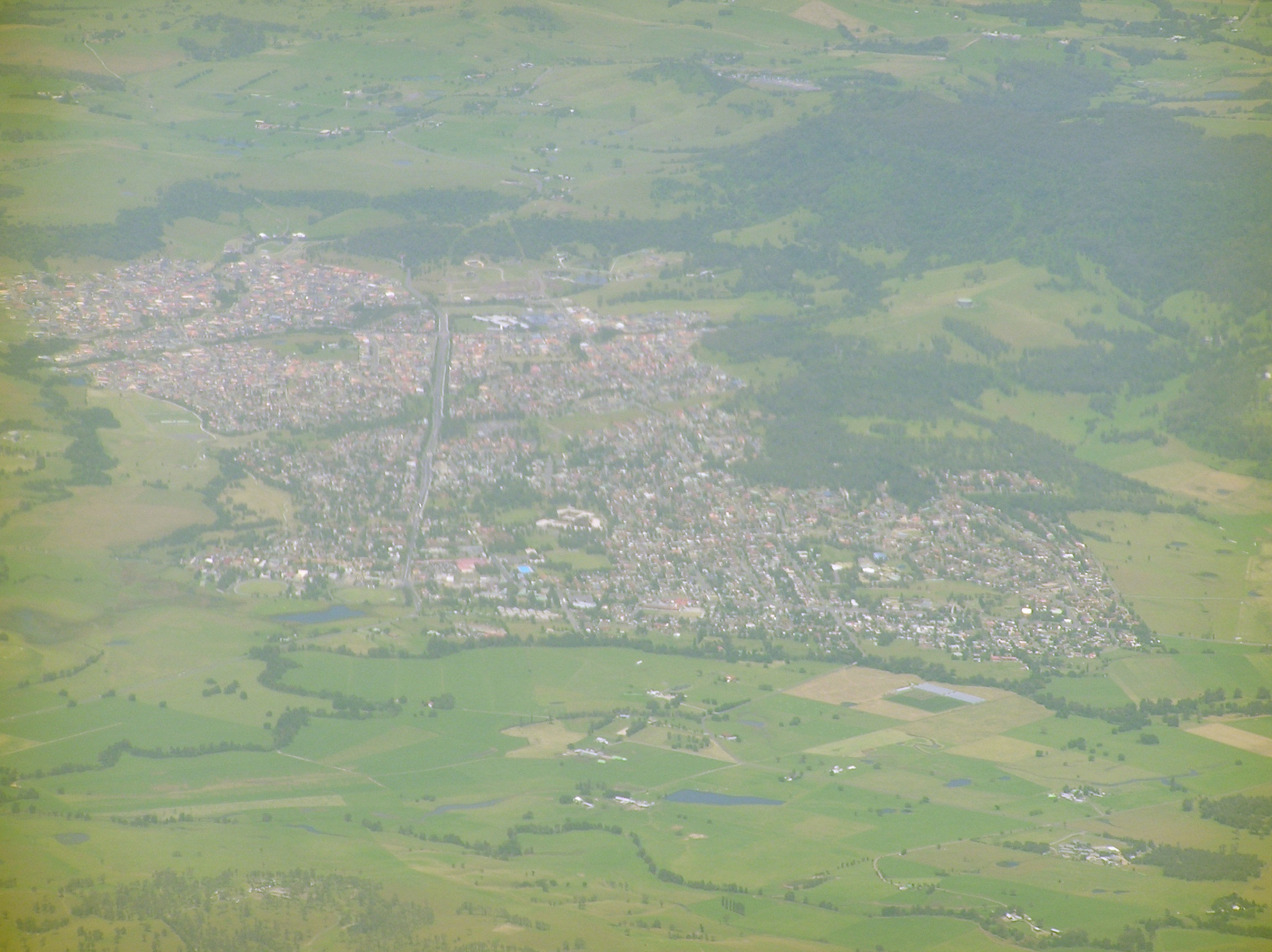
Aerial shot of Albion Park

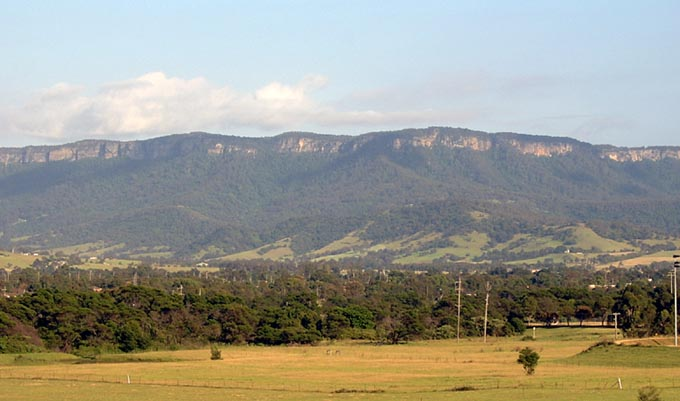
The Illawarra Escarpment as viewed from the plains of Albion Park

Albion Park is home to the Shellharbour Regional Sporting Complex, which consists of two all-weather hockey fields, several football (rugby league) fields, a multi-purpose indoor basketball stadium, a turf cricket / AFL field, an athletics field, a BMX track, a remote control car racing track, and several tennis courts. A cycleway also courses its way through the Sporting Complex and links it to a polo field and a complex of soccer fields. Albion Park is also home to a Shellharbour Council Swimming Pool, which is open during the summer months and now costs a fee of $2.00 entry, to a pool paid for by the members of the town.

=== Sport ===
Albion Park is also home to various sporting teams such as:

- Albion Park-Oak Flats Eagles
- Albion Park Hockey Club
- Albion Park Bowls and Recreation Club
- Albion Park Cows Football Club
- Albion Park Cricket Club
- Albion Park White Eagles
- Albion Park Crows Junior AFL Club

=== Museums ===
Albion Park has the Tongarra Museum, which showcases the history of the region, and the Historical Aircraft Restoration Society Museum located at the Illawarra Regional Airport.

=== Commercial area ===
There is a small Vicinity Centres shopping complex in Albion Park. In 2009, the local Council started a program to revitalize the town centre and it has attracted more tourists to the town.

== Climate ==
Albion Park has a humid subtropical climate (Köppen: Cfa) with warm summers and mild winters. Rainfall is spread through the months but has a bias to the first half of the year.

Climate data for Albion Park (Shellharbour Airport), 1999–present
| Month | Jan | Feb | Mar | Apr | May | Jun | Jul | Aug | Sep | Oct | Nov | Dec | Year |
|---|---|---|---|---|---|---|---|---|---|---|---|---|---|
| Record high °C (°F) | 45.8 (114.4) | 41.0 (105.8) | 39.6 (103.3) | 34.8 (94.6) | 28.0 (82.4) | 25.0 (77.0) | 28.0 (82.4) | 29.4 (84.9) | 35.1 (95.2) | 38.0 (100.4) | 41.8 (107.2) | 43.4 (110.1) | 45.8 (114.4) |
| Mean daily maximum °C (°F) | 26.9 (80.4) | 26.3 (79.3) | 25.4 (77.7) | 23.4 (74.1) | 20.6 (69.1) | 18.1 (64.6) | 17.8 (64.0) | 18.9 (66.0) | 21.5 (70.7) | 23.0 (73.4) | 24.1 (75.4) | 25.7 (78.3) | 22.6 (72.7) |
| Mean daily minimum °C (°F) | 17.2 (63.0) | 17.2 (63.0) | 17.2 (63.0) | 12.3 (54.1) | 9.1 (48.4) | 7.3 (45.1) | 6.5 (43.7) | 6.8 (44.2) | 8.6 (47.5) | 11.1 (52.0) | 13.6 (56.5) | 15.3 (59.5) | 11.7 (53.1) |
| Record low °C (°F) | 8.6 (47.5) | 9.7 (49.5) | 5.0 (41.0) | 2.0 (35.6) | 2.0 (35.6) | −2.0 (28.4) | −1.7 (28.9) | −2.0 (28.4) | 0.6 (33.1) | 1.0 (33.8) | 4.5 (40.1) | 6.1 (43.0) | −2.0 (28.4) |
| Average precipitation mm (inches) | 86.7 (3.41) | 145.1 (5.71) | 149.1 (5.87) | 81.9 (3.22) | 77.6 (3.06) | 84.5 (3.33) | 74.0 (2.91) | 64.7 (2.55) | 48.2 (1.90) | 70.4 (2.77) | 86.4 (3.40) | 67.4 (2.65) | 1,029.5 (40.53) |
| Average precipitation days (≥ 1.0 mm) | 8.5 | 8.5 | 9.2 | 7.2 | 5.3 | 6.0 | 5.1 | 4.7 | 5.4 | 6.9 | 7.9 | 7.7 | 82.7 |
| Average afternoon relative humidity (%) | 63 | 67 | 64 | 61 | 58 | 57 | 54 | 49 | 53 | 58 | 63 | 61 | 59 |
| Average dew point °C (°F) | 16.8 (62.2) | 17.6 (63.7) | 16.0 (60.8) | 13.1 (55.6) | 9.9 (49.8) | 7.6 (45.7) | 6.2 (43.2) | 5.9 (42.6) | 8.8 (47.8) | 10.9 (51.6) | 13.5 (56.3) | 14.9 (58.8) | 11.8 (53.2) |
Source: Bureau of Meteorology
