= List of schools in Illawarra and the South East =

This is a list of schools in the Illawarra, South Coast, Southern Highlands, Southern Tablelands, Monaro and Snowy Mountains regions of the Australian state of New South Wales. The New South Wales education system traditionally consists of primary schools, which accommodate students from Kindergarten to Year 6 (ages 5–12), and high schools, which accommodate students from Years 7 to 12 (ages 12–18).

== Public schools ==
=== Primary schools (K–6) ===
Name	Suburb	LGA	Opened
Adaminaby Public School	Adaminaby	Snowy Monaro	1869
Albion Park Public School	Albion Park	Shellharbour	1872
Albion Park Rail Public School	Albion Park Rail	Shellharbour	1959
Austinmer Public School	Austinmer	Wollongong	1867
Avoca Public School	Avoca	Wingecarribee	1872
Balarang Public School	Oak Flats	Shellharbour	1968
Balgownie Public School	Balgownie	Wollongong	1889
Bargo Public School	Bargo	Wollondilly	1869
Barrack Heights Public School	Barrack Heights	Shellharbour	1976
Batemans Bay Public School	Batemans Bay	Eurobodalla	1869
Bega Valley Public School	Bega	Bega Valley	1860
Bellambi Public School	Bellambi	Wollongong	1956
Bemboka Public School	Bemboka	Bega Valley	1871
Berinba Public School	Yass	Yass Valley	1972
Berkeley Public School	Berkeley	Wollongong	1858
Berkeley South Public School	Berkeley	Wollongong	1962
Berkeley West Public School	Berkeley	Wollongong	1959
Bermagui Public School	Bermagui	Bega Valley	1876
Berridale Public School	Berridale	Snowy Monaro	1883
Berrima Public School	Berrima	Wingecarribee	1855
Berry Public School	Berry	Shoalhaven	1860
Bibbenluke Public School	Bibbenluke	Snowy Monaro	1870
Bigga Public School	Bigga	Upper Lachlan	1884
Binalong Public School	Binalong	Yass Valley	1861
Binda Public School	Binda	Upper Lachlan	1851
Bodalla Public School	Bodalla	Eurobodalla	1867
Bomaderry Public School	Bomaderry	Shoalhaven	1867
Bombala Public School	Bombala	Snowy Monaro	1863
Boorowa Central School	Boorowa	Hilltops	1870
Bowning Public School	Bowning	Yass Valley	1849
Bowral Public School	Bowral	Wingecarribee	1867
Bradfordville Public School	Bradfordville	Goulburn	1970
Braidwood Central School	Braidwood	Queanbeyan–Palerang	1849
Breadalbane Public School	Breadalbane	Upper Lachlan	1875
Bredbo Public School	Bredbo	Snowy Monaro	1882
Broulee Public School	Broulee	Eurobodalla	1995
Bulli Public School	Bulli	Wollongong	1869
Bundanoon Public School	Bundanoon	Wingecarribee	1870
Bungendore Public School	Bungendore	Queanbeyan–Palerang	1868
Burrawang Public School	Burrawang	Wingecarribee	1878
Buxton Public School	Buxton	Wollondilly	1894
Callala Public School	Callala Bay	Shoalhaven	2000
Cambewarra Public School	Cambewarra Village	Shoalhaven	1859
Candelo Public School	Candelo	Bega Valley	1869
Captains Flat Public School	Captains Flat	Queanbeyan–Palerang	1884
Cawdor Public School	Cawdor	Wollondilly	1858
Central Tilba Public School	Central Tilba	Eurobodalla	1879
Cobargo Public School	Cobargo	Bega Valley	1871
Cobbitty Public School	Cobbitty	Camden	1882
Coledale Public School	Coledale	Wollongong	1912
Collector Public School	Collector	Yass Valley	1866
Colo Vale Public School	Colo Vale	Wingecarribee	1882
Coniston Public School	Coniston	Wollongong	1921
Cooma North Public School	Cooma	Snowy Monaro	1953
Cooma Public School	Cooma	Snowy Monaro	1863
Corrimal East Public School	East Corrimal	Wollongong	1952
Corrimal Public School	Corrimal	Wollongong	1890
Cringila Public School	Cringila	Wollongong	1957
Crookwell Public School	Crookwell	Upper Lachlan	1865
Culburra Public School	Culburra Beach	Shoalhaven	1976
Dalgety Public School	Dalgety	Snowy Monaro	1889
Dalton Public School	Dalton	Upper Lachlan	1860
Dapto Public School	Horsley	Wollongong	1875
Delegate Public School	Delegate	Snowy Monaro	1871
Douglas Park Public School	Douglas Park	Wollondilly	1883
Eden Public School	Eden	Bega Valley	1857
Exeter Public School	Exeter	Wingecarribee	1891
Fairy Meadow Public School	Fairy Meadow	Wollongong	1858
Falls Creek Public School	Falls Creek	Shoalhaven	1886
Farmborough Road Public School	Unanderra	Wollongong	1956
Figtree Heights Public School	Figtree	Wollongong	1972
Figtree Public School	Figtree	Wollongong	1956
Flinders Public School	Flinders	Shellharbour	2003
Gerringong Public School	Gerringong	Kiama	1876
Glenquarry Public School	Glenquarry	Wingecarribee	1869
Goulburn East Public School	Goulburn	Goulburn	1887
Goulburn North Public School	Goulburn North	Goulburn	1877
Goulburn Public School	Goulburn	Goulburn	1858
Goulburn South Public School	Goulburn	Goulburn	1881
Goulburn West Public School	Goulburn	Goulburn	1952
Greenwell Point Public School	Greenwell Point	Shoalhaven	1870
Gundaroo Public School	Gundaroo	Yass Valley	1865
Gunning Public School	Gunning	Upper Lachlan	1858
Gwynneville Public School	Gwynneville	Wollongong	1951
Hayes Park Public School	Kanahooka	Wollongong	1969
Helensburgh Public School	Helensburgh	Wollongong	1887
Hill Top Public School	Hill Top	Wingecarribee	1884
Huskisson Public School	Huskisson	Shoalhaven	1871
Illaroo Road Public School	North Nowra	Shoalhaven	1969
Jamberoo Public School	Jamberoo	Kiama	1878
Jerangle Public School	Jerangle	Snowy Monaro	1884
Jerrabomberra Public School	Jerrabomberra	Queanbeyan–Palerang	2001
Jindabyne Central School	Jindabyne	Snowy Monaro	1884
Kangaloon Public School	Kangaloon	Wingecarribee	1869
Kangaroo Valley Public School	Kangaroo Valley	Shoalhaven	1871
Keiraville Public School	Keiraville	Wollongong	1891
Kemblawarra Public School	Port Kembla	Wollongong	1959
Kiama Public School	Kiama	Kiama	1861
Koonawarra Public School	Koonawarra	Wollongong	1970
Laggan Public School	Laggan	Upper Lachlan	1868
Lake Heights Public School	Lake Heights	Wollongong	1956
Lake Illawarra South Public School	Lake Illawarra	Shellharbour	1954
Lakelands Public School	Dapto	Wollongong	1961
Lindsay Park Public School	West Wollongong	Wollongong	1959
Marulan Public School	Marulan	Goulburn	1860
Merimbula Public School	Merimbula	Bega Valley	1870
Michelago Public School	Michelago	Queanbeyan–Palerang	1868
Milton Public School	Milton	Shoalhaven	1878
Minnamurra Public School	Minnamurra	Kiama	1976
Mittagong Public School	Mittagong	Wingecarribee	1865
Mogo Public School	Mogo	Eurobodalla	1869
Moruya Public School	Moruya	Eurobodalla	1879
Moss Vale Public School	Moss Vale	Wingecarribee	1868
Mount Brown Public School	Dapto	Wollongong	1971
Mount Hunter Public School	Mount Hunter	Wollondilly	1859
Mount Keira Public School	Mount Keira	Wollongong	1861
Mount Kembla Public School	Mount Kembla	Wollongong	1859
Mount Ousley Public School	Fairy Meadow	Wollongong	1959
Mount St Thomas Public School	Mangerton	Wollongong	1952
Mount Terry Public School	Albion Park	Shellharbour	1995
Mount Warrigal Public School	Mount Warrigal	Shellharbour	1967
Murringo Public School	Murringo	Hilltops	1860
Nareena Hills Public School	Figtree	Wollongong	1977
Narooma Public School	Narooma	Eurobodalla	1889
Nimmitabel Public School	Nimmitabel	Snowy Monaro	1869
North Nowra Public School	North Nowra	Shoalhaven	1998
Nowra East Public School	Nowra	Shoalhaven	1964
Nowra Hill Public School	Nowra Hill	Shoalhaven	1867
Nowra Public School	Nowra	Shoalhaven	1862
Numeralla Public School	Numeralla	Snowy Monaro	1877
Oak Flats Public School	Oak Flats	Shellharbour	1952
Oakdale Public School	Oakdale	Wollondilly	1871
The Oaks Public School	The Oaks	Wollondilly	1883
Otford Public School	Otford	Wollongong	1885
Pambula Public School	Pambula	Bega Valley	1849
Penrose Public School	Penrose	Wingecarribee	1891
Picton Public School	Picton	Wollondilly	1868
Pleasant Heights Public School	Mount Pleasant	Wollongong	1969
Port Kembla Public School	Port Kembla	Wollongong	1890
Primbee Public School	Primbee	Wollongong	1938
Quaama Public School	Quaama	Bega Valley	1877
Queanbeyan East Public School	Queanbeyan	Queanbeyan–Palerang	1967
Queanbeyan Public School	Queanbeyan	Queanbeyan–Palerang	1864
Queanbeyan South Public School	Queanbeyan	Queanbeyan–Palerang	1969
Queanbeyan West Public School	Queanbeyan	Queanbeyan–Palerang	1958
Reids Flat Public School	Reids Flat	Hilltops	1908
Robertson Public School	Robertson	Wingecarribee	1872
Rugby Public School	Rugby	Hilltops	1887
Russell Vale Public School	Russell Vale	Wollongong	1954
Rye Park Public School	Rye Park	Hilltops	1876
Sanctuary Point Public School	Sanctuary Point	Shoalhaven	1976
Scarborough Public School	Scarborough	Wollongong	1878
Shell Cove Public School	Shell Cove	Shellharbour	2005
Shellharbour Public School	Shellharbour	Shellharbour	1859
Shoalhaven Heads Public School	Shoalhaven Heads	Shoalhaven	1861
St Georges Basin Public School	St Georges Basin	Shoalhaven	1949
Stanwell Park Public School	Stanwell Park	Wollongong	1917
Sunshine Bay Public School	Sunshine Bay	Eurobodalla	1985
Sussex Inlet Public School	Sussex Inlet	Shoalhaven	1947
Sutton Public School	Sutton	Yass Valley	1871
Sutton Forest Public School	Sutton Forest	Wingecarribee	1880
Tahmoor Public School	Tahmoor	Wollondilly	1916
Tallong Public School	Tallong	Goulburn	1865
Tanja Public School	Tanja	Bega Valley	1878
Tarago Public School	Tarago	Goulburn	1878
Taralga Public School	Taralga	Upper Lachlan	1858
Tarrawanna Public School	Tarrawanna	Wollongong	1952
Tathra Public School	Tathra	Bega Valley	1912
Terara Public School	Terara	Shoalhaven	1878
Thirlmere Public School	Thirlmere	Wollondilly	1888
Thirroul Public School	Thirroul	Wollongong	1889
Tirranna Public School	Tirrannaville	Goulburn	1869
Tomerong Public School	Tomerong	Shoalhaven	1862
Towamba Public School	Towamba	Bega Valley	1862
Towradgi Public School	Fairy Meadow	Wollongong	1953
Tullimbar Public School	Tullimbar	Shellharbour	1881
Ulladulla Public School	Ulladulla	Shoalhaven	1861
Unanderra Public School	Cordeaux Heights	Wollongong	1878
Vincentia Public School	Vincentia	Shoalhaven	1992
Waniora Public School	Bulli	Wollongong	1954
Warilla North Public School	Warilla	Shellharbour	1964
Warilla Public School	Warilla	Shellharbour	1956
Warragamba Public School	Warragamba	Wollondilly	1948
Warrawong Public School	Warrawong	Wollongong	1935
Wee Jasper Public School	Wee Jasper	Yass Valley	1899
Windang Public School	Windang	Wollongong	1942
Windellama Public School	Windellama	Goulburn	1871
Wingello Public School	Wingello	Wingecarribee	1885
Wollondilly Public School	Goulburn	Goulburn	1970
Wollongong Public School	Wollongong	Wollongong	1851
Wollongong West Public School	West Wollongong	Wollongong	1925
Wolumla Public School	Wolumla	Bega Valley	1882
Woonona East Public School	Woonona	Wollongong	1964
Woonona Public School	Woonona	Wollongong	1882
Wyndham Public School	Wyndham	Bega Valley	1868
Yanderra Public School	Yanderra	Wingecarribee	1935
Yass Public School	Yass	Yass Valley	1879

=== High schools ===
In New South Wales, a high school generally covers Years 7 to 12 in the education system, and a central or community school, intended to provide comprehensive education in a rural district, covers Kindergarten to Year 12. An additional class of high schools has emerged in recent years as a result of amalgamations which have produced multi-campus colleges consisting of Junior and Senior campuses.

While most schools are comprehensive and take in all students of high school age living within the defined school boundaries, some schools are either specialist in a given Key Learning Area, or selective in that they set examinations or other performance criteria for entrance. In the Illawarra and South East regions, Karabar (in Queanbeyan) and Smith's Hill (in Wollongong) are selective, whilst Wollongong High School of the Performing Arts and Illawarra Sports High School are specialist.

Approximately 2,000 New South Wales students attend schools in the Australian Capital Territory. The Territory has its own education system separate from the New South Wales system. Students who take this option may still apply to enrol in a New South Wales university through the University Admissions Centre upon completing year 12.

Name	Suburb	LGA	Opened
Albion Park High School	Albion Park	Shellharbour	1991
Batemans Bay High School	Batemans Bay	Eurobodalla	1988
Bega High School	Bega	Bega Valley	1952
Bomaderry High School	Bomaderry	Shoalhaven	1968
Bombala High School	Bombala	Snowy Monaro	1973
Bowral High School	Bowral	Wingecarribee	1930
Bulli High School	Bulli	Wollongong	1956
Corrimal High School	East Corrimal	Wollongong	1951
Crookwell High School	Crookwell	Upper Lachlan	1968
Dapto High School	Dapto	Wollongong	1958
Eden Marine High School	Eden	Bega Valley	1972
Figtree High School	Figtree	Wollongong	1969
Goulburn High School	Goulburn	Goulburn	1913
Illawarra Senior College	Port Kembla	Wollongong	1961
Illawarra Sports High School	Berkeley	Wollongong	1957
Kanahooka High School	Kanahooka	Wollongong	1973
Karabar High School	Queanbeyan	Queanbeyan–Palerang	1977
Keira High School	North Wollongong	Wollongong	1944
Kiama High School	Kiama	Kiama	1954
Lake Illawarra High School	Lake Illawarra	Shellharbour	1972
Monaro High School	Cooma	Snowy Monaro	1954
Moruya High School	Moruya	Eurobodalla	1966
Moss Vale High School	Moss Vale	Wingecarribee	1964
Mulwaree High School	Goulburn	Goulburn	1971
Narooma High School	Narooma	Eurobodalla	1979
Nowra High School	Nowra	Shoalhaven	1956
Oak Flats High School	Oak Flats	Shellharbour	1962
Picton High School	Picton	Wollondilly	1958
Queanbeyan High School	Queanbeyan	Queanbeyan–Palerang	1958
Shoalhaven High School	Nowra	Shoalhaven	1983
Smith's Hill High School	Wollongong	Wollongong	1944
Ulladulla High School	Ulladulla	Shoalhaven	1974
Vincentia High School	Vincentia	Shoalhaven	1993
Warilla High School	Barrack Heights	Shellharbour	1966
Warrawong High School	Warrawong	Wollongong	1972
Wollongong High School of the Performing Arts	North Wollongong	Wollongong	1917
Woonona High School	Woonona	Wollongong	1964
Yass High School	Yass	Yass Valley	1961

=== Special schools ===
Special schools are public schools designed for children or youth with chronic disabilities or who for other reasons cannot be accommodated in the comprehensive school system.

Name	Suburb	LGA	Opened	Website
Budawang School	Ulladulla	Shoalhaven	1994	Website
The Crescent School	Goulburn	Goulburn	1969	Website
Havenlee School	North Nowra	Shoalhaven	1981	Website
Highlands School	Mittagong	Wingecarribee	2001	Website
Illawarra Hospital School	Wollongong	Wollongong	1968	Website
Para Meadows School	North Wollongong	Wollongong	1953	Website
Peterborough School	Warilla	Shellharbour	1973	Website
Tangara School	Mittagong	Wingecarribee	1977	Website

=== Defunct primary schools ===
Name	Suburb	LGA	Opened	Closed
Alpine Public School	Alpine	Wingecarribee	1916	1919
Amungula Public School	near Sutton	Yass Valley	1888	1913
Ando Public School	Ando	Snowy Monaro	1914	2012
Anglewood School	Burradoo	Wingecarribee	1943	1993
Anembo Public School	Anembo	Snowy Monaro	1868	1942
Angledale Public School	Angledale	Bega Valley	1881	1965
Arable Public School	Arable	Snowy Monaro	1884	1913
Araluen Public School	Araluen	Queanbeyan–Palerang	1870	1971
Araluen Upper Public School	Araluen	Queanbeyan–Palerang	1872	1888
Araluen West Public School	Araluen	Queanbeyan–Palerang	1867	1919
Arina Public School	near Bargo	Wollondilly	1895	1919
Avon Dam Public School	Avon	Wingecarribee	1920	1927
Avondale Public School	Avondale	Wollongong	1860	1955
Aylmerton Public School	Aylmerton	Wingecarribee	1930	1985
Back Creek Public School	Braidwood	Queanbeyan–Palerang	1874	1931
Bald Hills Public School	Bald Hills	Bega Valley	1900	1911
Ballalaba Public School	Ballalaba	Queanbeyan–Palerang	1892	1938
Balmoral Public School	Balmoral	Wingecarribee	1888	1959
Bamarang Public School	Bamarang	Shoalhaven	1868	1923
Bango Public School	Bango	Yass Valley	1878	1928
Bannaby Public School	Bannaby	Upper Lachlan	1878	1938
Bannister Public School	Bannister	Upper Lachlan	1878	1968
Barrengarry Public School	Barrengarry	Shoalhaven	1874	1930
Bawley Point Public School	Bawley Point	Shoalhaven	1894	1922
Baw Baw Public School	Baw Baw	Goulburn	1879	1941
Beaumont Public School	Beaumont	Shoalhaven	1877	1949
Bedellick Public School	near Cavan	Yass Valley	1878	1903
Bega West Public School	Bega	Bega Valley	1959	2012
Belanglo Public School	Belanglo	Wingecarribee	1885	1936
Bellawongarah Public School	Bellawongarah	Shoalhaven	1874	1927
Bells Creek Public School	Bells Creek	Queanbeyan–Palerang	1870	1909
Benandarah Public School	Benandarah	Eurobodalla	1890	1970
Bendeela Public School	Bendeela	Shoalhaven	1878	1926
Bendoura Public School	Bendoura	Queanbeyan–Palerang	1891	1927
Bergalia Public School	Bergalia	Eurobodalla	1867	1931
Berida Red Cross Home	Bowral	Wingecarribee	1951	1974
Berlang Public School	Berlang	Queanbeyan–Palerang	1871	1893
Berry Training Farm School	Berry	Shoalhaven	1960	1977
Bettowynd Public School	near Mogo	Eurobodalla	1874	1895
Bevendale Public School	Bevendale	Upper Lachlan	1886	1971
Bimbimbie Public School	Bimbimbie	Eurobodalla	1899	1909
Bolaro Public School	Bolaro	Snowy Monaro	1881	1916
Bolong Public School	Bolong	Shoalhaven	1861	1963
Bombo Public School	Bombo	Kiama	1890	1948
Bookham Public School	Bookham	Yass Valley	1882	1983
Boro Lower Public School	Boro	Queanbeyan–Palerang	1870	1947
Bournda North Public School	Bournda	Bega Valley	1884	1918
Box Vale Public School	near Woodlands	Wingecarribee	1900	1914
Brayton Public School	Brayton	Goulburn	1859	1953
Brogo North Public School	Brogo	Bega Valley	1932	1952
Brogo Public School	Brogo	Bega Valley	1882	1968
Brooks Creek Public School	Brooks Creek	Queanbeyan–Palerang	1884	1929
Brooman Public School	Brooman	Shoalhaven	1879	1966
Broughton Vale Public School	Broughton Vale	Shoalhaven	1867	1943
Broughton Village Public School	Broughton Village	Shoalhaven	1867	1901
Buckajo Public School	Buckajo	Bega Valley	1893	1951
Budgong Gap Public School	near Kangaroo Valley	Shoalhaven	1884	1909
Budgong Vale Public School	near Kangaroo Valley	Shoalhaven	1885	1898
Bullio Public School	Bullio	Wingecarribee	1884	1929
Bungarby Public School	Bungarby	Snowy Monaro	1884	1972
Bungonia Public School	Bungonia	Goulburn	1868	1973
Bunyan Public School	Bunyan	Snowy Monaro	1895	1936
Burra Public School	Burra	Queanbeyan–Palerang	1871	1933
Burragate Public School	Burragate	Bega Valley	1868	1959
Burragorang Public School	Nattai	Wollondilly	1883	1957
Burragorang Upper Public School	Nattai	Wollondilly	1909	1950
Burrier Public School	Burrier	Shoalhaven	1868	1952
Burrill Lake Public School	Burrill Lake	Shoalhaven	1898	1903
Burrill Public School	Burrill Lake	Shoalhaven	1876	1934
Burrinjuck Public School	Burrinjuck	Yass Valley	1907	1970
Bywong Public School	Bywong	Queanbeyan–Palerang	1895	1906
Cambewarra West Public School	Cambewarra Village	Shoalhaven	1879	1927
Canyan Leigh Public School	Canyonleigh	Wingecarribee	1895	1920
Caoura Public School	Caoura	Goulburn	1881	1892
Carwoola Public School	Carwoola	Queanbeyan–Palerang	1868	1924
Cataract Dam Public School	Cataract	Wollongong	1903	1907
Cathcart Public School	Cathcart	Snowy Monaro	1870	1975
Cavan Public School	Cavan	Yass Valley	1882	1895
Chakola Public School	Chakola	Snowy Monaro	1882	1921
Chatsbury Public School	Chatsbury	Goulburn	1871	1940
Clonalton Public School	Reids Flat	Hilltops	1887	1949
Colinton Public School	Colinton	Snowy Monaro	1883	1938
Conjola Public School	Conjola	Shoalhaven	1874	1921
Coolagolite Public School	Coolagolite	Bega Valley	1877	1947
Coolalie Public School	Coolalie	Yass Valley	1880	1956
Coolringdon Public School	Coolringdon	Snowy Monaro	1879	1918
Cooma East Public School	Cooma	Snowy Monaro	1955	1972
Coopers Glen Public School	Coopers Gully	Bega Valley	1896	1922
Cootralantra Public School	Cootralantra	Snowy Monaro	1893	1944
Corang River Public School	Corang	Queanbeyan–Palerang	1873	1920
Corunna Public School	Corunna	Eurobodalla	1893	1920
Cottawalla Public School	Cottawalla	Upper Lachlan	1869	1945
Countegany Public School	Countegany	Cooma-Monaro	1883	1946
Cowra Creek Public School	Cowra Creek	Snowy Monaro	1884	1910
Craigie Public School	Craigie	Snowy Monaro	1871	1944
Croobyar Public School	Croobyar	Shoalhaven	1862	1934
Crookwell River Public School	Crookwell	Upper Lachlan	1957	1968
Croome Public School	Curramore	Kiama	1884	1924
Cullerin Public School	Cullerin	Upper Lachlan	1876	1964
Cullulla Public School	Boro	Queanbeyan–Palerang	1885	1941
Currawang Public School	Currawang	Goulburn	1870	1944
Currowan Public School	Currowan	Shoalhaven	1882	1916
Cuttagee Public School	Cuttagee	Bega Valley	1891	1933
Dairymans Plains Public School	Dairymans Plains	Snowy Monaro	1881	1913
Dangelong Public School	Dangelong	Snowy Monaro	1873	1912
Dapto West Public School	Dapto	Wollongong	1883	1972
Darkes Forest Public School	Darkes Forest	Wollongong	1890	1925
Deua River Public School	Deua River	Eurobodalla	1883	1907
Dignams Creek Public School	Dignams Creek	Eurobodalla	1877	1942
Druwalla Public School	Tullimbar	Shellharbour	1879	1920
Durras Lake Public School	South Durras	Shoalhaven	1884	1908
Dwyers Creek Public School	Dwyers Creek	Eurobodalla	1909	1928
Eden Forest Public School	Eden Forest	Upper Lachlan	1908	1931
Eling Forest Public School	Sutton Forest	Wingecarribee	1852	1884
Elmwood Public School	Elmwood	Wingecarribee	1887	1972
Eucumbene Public School	Eucumbene	Snowy Monaro	1954	1967
Euralie Public School	near Good Hope	Yass Valley	1873	1929
Eurobodalla Public School	Eurobodalla	Eurobodalla	1864	1944
Far Meadow Public School	Far Meadow	Shoalhaven	1897	1970
Forest Home Public School	Forest Home	Eurobodalla	1900	1944
Foxground Public School	Foxground	Shoalhaven	1883	1950
Frogmore Public School	Frogmore	Hilltops	1875	1982
Fullerton Public School	Fullerton	Upper Lachlan	1875	1925
Garfield Public School	Numbugga	Bega Valley	1879	1970
Glen Allen Public School	Glen Allen	Snowy Monaro	1896	1921
Glenmore Public School	Glenmore	Wollondilly	1864	1911
Goba Creek Public School	Goba Creek	Hilltops	1909	1914
Godfreys Creek Public School	Godfreys Creek	Hilltops	1896	1968
Golspie Public School	Golspie	Upper Lachlan	1872	1948
Good Hope Public School	Good Hope	Yass Valley	1872	1913
Googong Public School	Googong	Queanbeyan–Palerang	1883	1913
Goondah Public School	Goondah	Yass Valley	1909	1959
Gourlay Public School	Gourlay	Bega Valley	1885	1913
Grabine Public School	Grabine	Upper Lachlan	1913	1928
Graham Public School	Reids Flat	Hilltops	1884	1966
Greenwich Park Public School	Greenwich Park	Goulburn	1880	1950
Greigs Flat Public School	Greigs Flat	Bega Valley	1869	1951
Gullen Public School	Grabben Gullen	Upper Lachlan	1883	1971
Gundaroo Upper Public School	near Gundaroo	Yass Valley	1868	1920
Gundillion Public School	Gundillion	Queanbeyan–Palerang	1871	1938
Gunnary Creek Public School	Gunnary	Upper Lachlan	1874	1902
Gurrundah Public School	Gurrundah	Upper Lachlan	1872	1986
Gurrundah Upper Public School	Gurrundah	Upper Lachlan	1938	1940
Hadley Public School	Hadley	Upper Lachlan	1891	1968
Harley Hill Public School	Harley Hill	Shoalhaven	1885	1926
Harolds Cross Public School	Harolds Cross	Queanbeyan–Palerang	1949	1957
High Range Public School	High Range	Wingecarribee	1870	1933
Hoskinstown Public School	Hoskinstown	Queanbeyan–Palerang	1869	1967
Illaroo Public School	North Nowra	Shoalhaven	1884	1908
Illawambra Public School	Verona	Bega Valley	1902	1911
Jaspers Brush Public School	Jaspers Brush	Shoalhaven	1884	1969
Jeir Public School	Jeir	Yass Valley	1878	1924
Jellat Jellat Public School	Jellat Jellat	Bega Valley	1871	1974
Jellore Public School	Jellore	Wingecarribee	1876	1915
Jembaicumbene Public School	Jembaicumbene	Queanbeyan–Palerang	1870	1934
Jerrabattgulla Public School	Jerrabattgulla	Queanbeyan–Palerang	1892	1957
Jerrara Public School	Jerrara	Kiama	1858	1950
Jerrawa Public School	Jerrawa	Upper Lachlan	1877	1963
Jervis Bay Public School	Jervis Bay	Jervis Bay Territory	1914	1974
Jingera Public School	Jingera	Snowy Monaro	1889	1941
Joadja Public School	Joadja	Wingecarribee	1879	1908
John Richardson School	Unanderra	Wollongong	1978	2009
Junction Point Public School	Junction Point	Upper Lachlan	1870	1916
Kameruka Public School	Kameruka	Bega Valley	1879	1962
Kangaloon East Public School	East Kangaloon	Wingecarribee	1868	1969
Kangaroo River Public School	Kangaroo River	Wingecarribee	1877	1916
Kangaroo River Upper Public School	Upper Kangaroo River	Wingecarribee	1888	1969
Kangiara Public School	Kangiara	Yass Valley	1910	1958
Kanoona Public School	Kanoona	Bega Valley	1865	1928
Kennys Creek Public School	Kennys Creek	Hilltops	1885	1933
Kiah Public School	Kiah	Bega Valley	1899	1968
Kialla Public School	Kialla	Upper Lachlan	1869	1970
Kianga Public School	Kianga	Eurobodalla	1901	1935
Kingsdale Public School	Kingsdale	Goulburn	1885	1929
Kioloa Public School	Kioloa	Shoalhaven	1879	1922
Kiora Public School	Kiora	Eurobodalla	1868	1928
Komungla Public School	Komungla	Goulburn	1927	1945
Kybeyan Public School	Kybeyan	Snowy Monaro	1887	1907
Kydra Public School	Kydra	Snowy Monaro	1886	1907
Lade Vale Public School	Lade Vale	Upper Lachlan	1907	1939
Lake Bathurst Public School	Lake Bathurst	Goulburn	1868	1969
Lakelands Public School	Picton	Wollondilly	1887	1904
Leighwood Public School	Leighwood	Upper Lachlan	1879	1898
Lerida Public School	Lerida	Upper Lachlan	1884	1907
Limerick Public School	Limerick	Upper Lachlan	1895	1973
Limestone Creek Public School	near Bowning	Yass Valley	1883	1948
Little Forest Public School	Little Forest	Shoalhaven	1893	1914
Little Plain Public School	Little Plain	Snowy Monaro	1879	1966
Lochiel Public School	Lochiel	Bega Valley	1869	1970
Lost River Public School	Lost River	Upper Lachlan	1873	1936
Majors Creek Public School	Majors Creek	Queanbeyan–Palerang	1857	1967
Manchester Square Public School	Manchester Square	Wingecarribee	1876	1911
Mangellore Public School	Mandemar	Wingecarribee	1898	1922
Manton Public School	Manton	Yass Valley	1877	1940
Marlowe Public School	Marlowe	Queanbeyan–Palerang	1869	1940
Marshall Mount Public School	Marshall Mount	Shellharbour	1859	1972
Marulan South Public School	South Marulan	Goulburn	1934	1995
Medway Public School	Medway	Wingecarribee	1883	1968
Menangle Public School	Menangle	Wollondilly	1871	1976
Meroo Flat Public School	Meroo Meadow	Shoalhaven	1882	1928
Meroo Meadow Public School	Meroo Meadow	Shoalhaven	1867	1971
Merricumbene Public School	Merricumbene	Eurobodalla	1893	1904
Merrilla Public School	Merrilla	Upper Lachlan	1870	1927
Merryvale Public School	near Roslyn	Upper Lachlan	1881	1941
Meryla Public School	Meryla	Wingecarribee	1883	1901
Middle Arm Public School	Middle Arm	Goulburn	1928	1955
Mila Public School	Mila	Snowy Monaro	1883	1944
Millingandi Public School	Millingandi	Bega Valley	1884	1936
Mittagong Lower Public School	Mittagong	Wingecarribee	1871	1944
Mogendoura Public School	Mogendoura	Eurobodalla	1889	1931
Mogilla Public School	Mogilla	Bega Valley	1877	1959
Monga Public School	Monga	Queanbeyan–Palerang	1947	1971
Mongarlowe Public School	Mongarlowe	Queanbeyan–Palerang	1863	1963
Moonbah Public School	Moonbah	Snowy Monaro	1885	1971
Mount Collins Public School	Mount Collins	Hilltops	1886	1904
Mount Fairy Public School	Mount Fairy	Queanbeyan–Palerang	1910	1951
Mount Murray Public School	Mount Murray	Wingecarribee	1872	1943
Mowbray Park Public School	Mowbray Park	Wollondilly	1907	1948
Mugwill Public School	Bywong	Queanbeyan–Palerang	1875	1929
Mulgowrie Public School	Mulgowrie	Upper Lachlan	1959	1972
Mullengrove Public School	Mullengrove	Upper Lachlan	1884	1964
Mullion Public School	Mullion	Yass Valley	1959	1972
Mummel Lower Public School	Mummel	Goulburn	1938	1959
Mummel Public School	Mummel	Goulburn	1870	1936
Murrah Public School	Murrah	Bega Valley	1891	1963
Murramurrang Public School	South Durras	Shoalhaven	1923	1931
Murrumbateman Public School	Murrumbateman	Yass Valley	1869	1973
Myalla Public School	Myalla	Snowy Monaro	1873	1920
Myra Vale Public School	Myra Vale	Wingecarribee	1877	1968
Myrtle Creek Public School	Tahmoor	Wollondilly	1872	1904
Myrtleville Public School	Myrtleville	Goulburn	1860	1970
Narrawa Public School	Narrawa	Upper Lachlan	1963	1970
Narrawa North Public School	Narrawa	Upper Lachlan	1952	1959
Nattai Public School	Nattai	Wollondilly	1930	1973
Nelligen Public School	Nelligen	Eurobodalla	1865	1969
Nepean Dam Public School	Yanderra	Wollondilly	1926	1936
Nerriga Public School	Nerriga	Queanbeyan–Palerang	1868	1975
Nerrigundah Public School	Nerrigundah	Eurobodalla	1863	1972
Nethercote Public School	Nethercote	Bega Valley	1887	1968
Newstead Public School	Moruya Heads	Eurobodalla	1868	1934
Nullica Public School	Nullica	Bega Valley	1899	1934
Numbaa Public School	Numbaa	Shoalhaven	1883	1953
Numbla Vale Public School	Numbla Vale	Snowy Monaro	1881	1972
Numbugga Public School	Numbugga	Bega Valley	1876	1927
Omega Public School	Gerringong	Kiama	1860	1941
Orangeville Public School	Orangeville	Wollondilly	1866	1964
Parkesbourne Public School	Parkesbourne	Goulburn	1870	1969
Peak View Public School	Peak View	Snowy Monaro	1875	1960
Pebbly Beach Public School	Pebbly Beach	Shoalhaven	1910	1929
Peelwood Public School	Peelwood	Upper Lachlan	1872	1967
Pejar Gully Public School	Pejar	Upper Lachlan	1905	1937
Pericoe Public School	Pericoe	Bega Valley	1884	1937
Port Kembla Hospital School	Port Kembla	Wollongong	1977	1983
Pudman Creek Public School	Pudman Creek	Upper Lachlan	1882	1952
Pyree Public School	Pyree	Shoalhaven	1860	1976
Redground Public School	Redground	Upper Lachlan	1868	1940
Reidsdale Public School	Reidsdale	Queanbeyan–Palerang	1883	1946
Rhyanna Public School	Rhyanna	Upper Lachlan	1879	1962
Rock Flat Public School	Rock Flat	Snowy Monaro	1884	1918
Rocky Hall Public School	Rocky Hall	Bega Valley	1876	1974
Roseby Park Aboriginal School	Orient Point	Shoalhaven	1903	1964
Rosemeath Public School	Rosemeath	Snowy Monaro	1902	1963
Roslyn Public School	Roslyn	Upper Lachlan	1865	1975
Rossi Public School	Rossi	Queanbeyan–Palerang	1874	1972
Rutledge Public School	Bungendore	Queanbeyan–Palerang	1889	1967
Sassafras Public School	Sassafras	Shoalhaven	1887	1903
Shallow Crossing Public School	Currowan	Shoalhaven	1883	1942
Shannons Flat Public School	Shannons Flat	Snowy Monaro	1906	1965
Shaws Creek Public School	Boxers Creek	Goulburn	1873	1961
Silverdale Public School	Silverdale	Wollondilly	1872	1968
Southwood School	Mittagong	Wingecarribee	1938	1976
Springfield Public School	Springfield	Goulburn	1867	1971
Springvale Public School	near Bega	Bega Valley	1876	1962
Stony Creek Public School	near Bega	Bega Valley	1872	1960
Strathaird Public School	Wowagin	Upper Lachlan	1879	1965
Sutton Forest Public School	Sutton Forest	Wingecarribee	1880	Dec 2014
Tangmangaroo Public School	Tangmangaroo	Yass Valley	1871	1969
Tantawangalo Public School	Tantawangalo	Bega Valley	1871	1960
Tanto Public School	Wandella	Bega Valley	1890	1933
Tarlo Gap Public School	Tarlo	Upper Lachlan	1876	1946
Tarraganda Public School	Tarraganda	Bega Valley	1872	1932
Taylors Flat Public School	Taylors Flat	Hilltops	1883	1915
Termeil Public School	Termeil	Shoalhaven	1885	1955
Theresa Park Public School	Theresa Park	Wollondilly	1868	1958
Third Creek Public School	Third Creek	Upper Lachlan	1869	1941
Tombong Public School	Tombong	Snowy Monaro	1883	1923
Tongarra Public School	Tongarra	Wingecarribee	1872	1919
Toolijooa Public School	Toolijooa	Shoalhaven	1871	1951
Toombong School	Mittagong	Wingecarribee	1944	1994
Toothdale Public School	Toothdale	Bega Valley	1884	1946
Toual Public School	Murrumbateman	Yass Valley	1888	1931
Townsend Public School	Townsend	Snowy Monaro	1884	1954
Towrang Public School	Towrang	Goulburn	1885	1968
Tuena Public School	Tuena	Upper Lachlan	1860	1998
Turlinjah Public School	Turlinjah	Eurobodalla	1880	1968
Urila Public School	Urila	Queanbeyan–Palerang	1884	1913
Verona Public School	Verona	Bega Valley	1882	1954
Wallaga Lake Aboriginal School	Wallaga Lake	Bega Valley	1887	1964
Wallagoot Public School	Wallagoot	Bega Valley	1884	1912
Wandandian Public School	Wandandian	Shoalhaven	1868	1970
Wandella Public School	Wandella	Bega Valley	1873	1965
Wapengo Public School	Wapengo	Bega Valley	1881	1925
Waterhole Flat Public School	near Gunnary	Upper Lachlan	1889	1913
Wattamolla Public School	Wattamolla	Shoalhaven	1870	1950
Wheeo Public School	Wheeo	Upper Lachlan	1868	1909
Wolumla North Public School	Wolumla	Bega Valley	1865	1928
Wolumla South Public School	South Wolumla	Bega Valley	1866	1960
Wongawilli Public School	Horsley	Shellharbour	1927	1976
Woodhill Public School	Woodhill	Shoalhaven	1876	1944
Woodhouselee Public School	Woodhouselee	Upper Lachlan	1879	1942
Woronora Dam Public School	Woronora Dam	Wollongong	1927	1943
Worrigee Public School	Worrigee	Shoalhaven	1855	1906
Wreck Bay Aboriginal School	Jervis Bay	Jervis Bay Territory	1931	1964
Yalbraith Public School	Yalbraith	Upper Lachlan	1869	1925
Yalwal Public School	Yalwal	Shoalhaven	1881	1928
Yambulla Public School	Yambulla	Bega Valley	1901	1918
Yarra Public School	Yarra	Goulburn	1869	1970
Yass Aboriginal School	Yass	Yass Valley	1930	1951
Yatteyattah Public School	Yatteyattah	Shoalhaven	1879	1959
Yerriyong Public School	Yerriyong	Shoalhaven	1882	1895
Yowrie Public School	Yowrie	Bega Valley	1892	1933

== Private schools ==
=== Catholic primary schools ===
In New South Wales, Catholic primary schools are usually (but not always) linked to a parish. Prior to the 1970s, most schools were founded by religious institutes, but with the decrease in membership of these institutes, together with major reforms inside the church, lay teachers and administrators began to take over the schools, a process which completed by approximately 1995. The Catholic Education Office (CEO), located in the Canberra-Goulburn and Broken Bay dioceses of the Church, is responsible for coordinating administration, curriculum and policy across the Catholic school system. Preference for enrolment is given to Catholic students from the parish or local area, although non-Catholic students are admitted if room is available.

Name	Suburb	LGA	Website
Holy Cross Catholic Primary School	Helensburgh	Wollongong	Website
Mount Carmel School	Yass	Yass Valley	Website
Nazareth Catholic Primary School	Shellharbour CC	Shellharbour	Website
St Anthony's Primary School	Picton	Wollondilly	Website
St Bede's Primary School	Braidwood	Queanbeyan–Palerang	Website
St Bernard's Primary School	Batehaven	Eurobodalla	Website
St Brigid's Primary School	Gwynneville	Wollongong	Website
St Columbkille's Parish School	Corrimal	Wollongong	Website
St Francis of Assisi's Primary School	Warrawong	Wollongong	Website
St Francis Xavier Primary School	Wollongong	Wollongong	Website
St Gregory's Primary School	Queanbeyan	Queanbeyan–Palerang	Website
St John's Primary School	Dapto	Wollongong	Website
St John Vianney's Primary School	Fairy Meadow	Wollongong	Website
St Joseph's Primary School	Bombala	Snowy Monaro	Website
St Joseph's Primary School	Boorowa	Hilltops	Website
St Joseph's Catholic Primary School	Bulli	Wollongong	Website
St Joseph's Primary School	Eden	Bega Valley	Website
St Joseph's Primary School	North Goulburn	Goulburn	Website
St Mary's Primary School	Moruya	Eurobodalla	Website
St Mary's Star of the Sea Primary School	Milton	Shoalhaven	Website
St Michael's Primary School	Mittagong	Wingecarribee	Website
St Michael's Primary School	Nowra	Shoalhaven	Website
St Michael's Primary School	Thirroul	Wollongong	Website
St Patrick's Parish School	Cooma	Snowy Monaro	Website
St Patrick's Primary School	Bega	Bega Valley	Website
St Patrick's Primary School	Port Kembla	Wollongong	Website
St Paul's Catholic Primary School	Albion Park	Shellharbour	Website
St Paul's Primary School	Moss Vale	Wingecarribee	Website
Sts Peter and Paul Parish School	Goulburn	Goulburn	Website
Sts Peter and Paul School	Kiama	Kiama	Website
St Pius X Primary School	Unanderra	Wollongong	Website
St Therese's Primary School	West Wollongong	Wollongong	Website
St Thomas Aquinas Primary School	Bowral	Wingecarribee	Website
Stella Maris Catholic Primary School	Shellharbour	Shellharbour	Website

=== Catholic high schools ===
Name	Suburb	LGA	Website
Carroll College	Broulee	Eurobodalla	Website
Corpus Christi Catholic High School	Oak Flats	Shellharbour	Website
Holy Spirit College	Bellambi	Wollongong	Website
Lumen Christi Catholic College	Pambula	Bega Valley	Website
St John the Evangelist Catholic High School	Nowra	Shoalhaven	Website
St Joseph's Catholic High School	Albion Park	Shellharbour	Website
Trinity Catholic College	Goulburn	Goulburn	Website

=== Other private schools ===
Name	Suburb	LGA
Cedars Christian College	Farmborough Heights	Wollongong
Chevalier College	Bowral	Wingecarribee
Edmund Rice College	West Wollongong	Wollongong
Elonera Montessori School	Mount Ousley	Wollongong
Frensham School	Mittagong	Wingecarribee
Gib Gate School	Mittagong	Wingecarribee
Illawarra Adventist School	Corrimal	Wollongong
Illawarra Christian School (Tongarra) - now known as Calderwood Christian School	Albion Park	Shellharbour
Illawarra Christian School (Cordeaux)	Cordeaux Heights	Wollongong
The Illawarra Grammar School	Wollongong	Wollongong
Jervis Bay Christian Community School	Vincentia	Shoalhaven
M.E.T. School – Darkes Forest Campus	Darkes Forest	Wollongong
M.E.T. School – Goulburn Campus	Goulburn	Goulburn
M.E.T. School – Queanbeyan Campus	Queanbeyan	Queanbeyan–Palerang
Mumbulla School for Rudolf Steiner Education	Bega	Bega Valley
Nowra Anglican College	Bomaderry	Shoalhaven
Nowra Christian School	Nowra	Shoalhaven
Oxley College	Burradoo	Wingecarribee
St Mary Star of the Sea College	Wollongong	Wollongong
St Pauls International College	Moss Vale	Wingecarribee
St Peter's Anglican College	Broulee	Eurobodalla
Sapphire Coast Anglican College	Bega	Bega Valley
Sapphire Coast Anglican College	Pambula	Bega Valley
Shellharbour Anglican College	Dunmore	Shellharbour
Snowy Mountains Christian School	Cooma	Snowy Monaro
Snowy Mountains Grammar School	Jindabyne	Snowy Monaro
Southern Highlands Christian School	Bowral	Wingecarribee
Tambelin Independent School	Goulburn	Goulburn
Thomas More Christian Montessori School	Bega	Bega Valley
Tudor House School	Moss Vale	Wingecarribee
Wollondilly Anglican College	Bargo	Wollondilly

=== Special-purpose private schools ===
The Government of New South Wales recognises a registration category of schools known as "Prescribed Non-Government Schools" which serve the same purposes as Special Schools but are privately operated.

Name	Suburb	LGA	Opened	Website
Eddy's Annexe	Towradgi	Wollongong	1994	Website
Aspect South Coast School	Corrimal	Wollongong	1986	Website
William Campbell College	North Nowra	Shoalhaven	2009	Website

=== Defunct private schools ===
Name	Suburb	LGA	Closed
Holy Cross College	Bellambi	Wollongong	1982
Marian College	Goulburn	Goulburn	1999
Our Lady of Mercy College	Goulburn	Goulburn	1977
St Joseph's College	North Goulburn	Goulburn	1977
St Michael's High School	Nowra	Shoalhaven	1967
St Patrick's College	Goulburn	Goulburn	1999
St Patrick's School	Berry	Shoalhaven	1979
St Paul's College	Bellambi	Wollongong	1982

== See also ==
- Lists of schools in Australia
- List of schools in New South Wales
