= Mylène Halemai =

Australian-born French tennis player

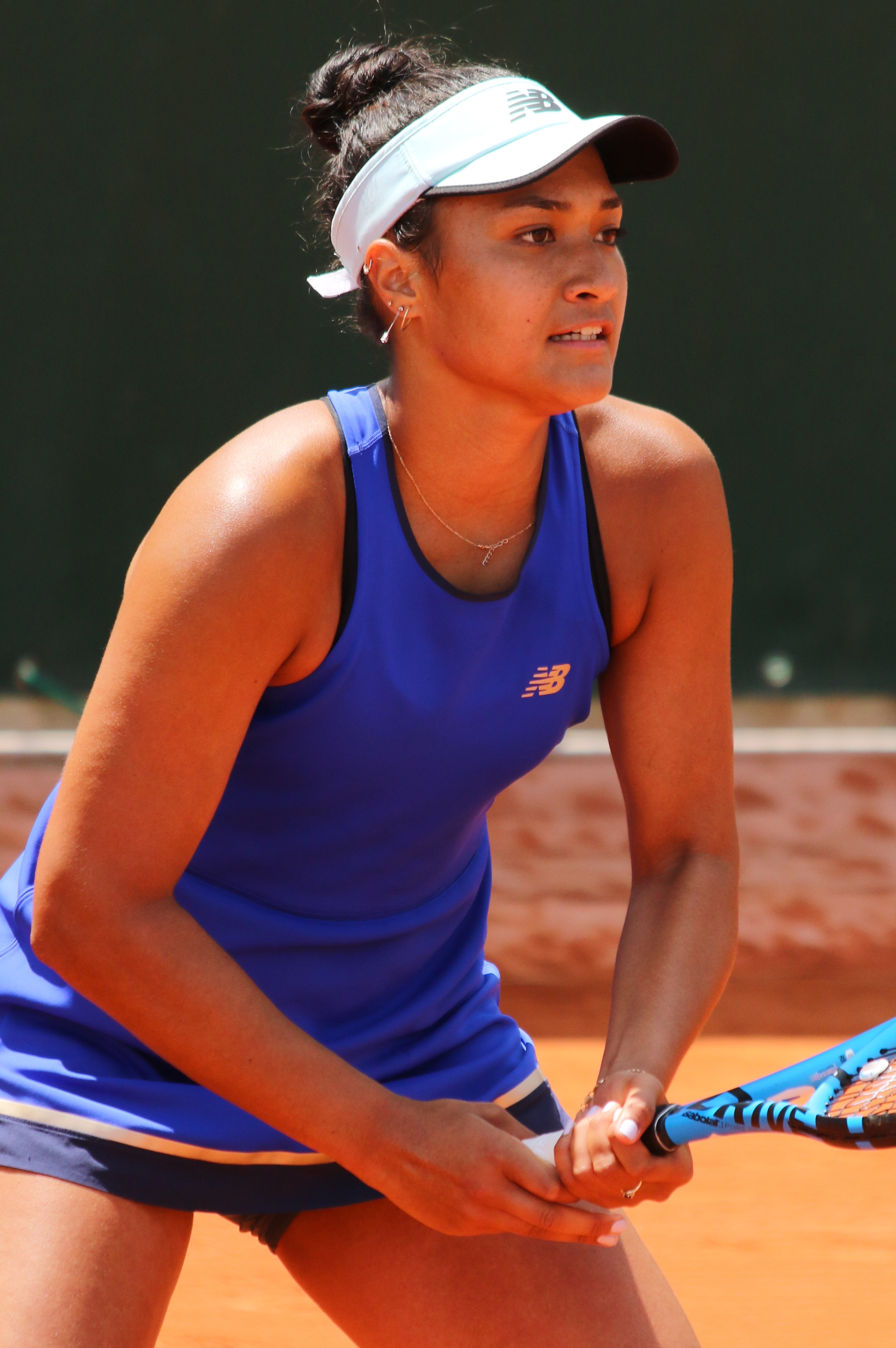
- Halemai at the 2019 French Open
- Country (sports): France
- Residence: Fineveke, Wallis and Futuna, France
- Born: 11 August 2001 (age 23); South Durras, New South Wales, Australia
- Height: 1.77 m (5 ft 10 in)
- Plays: Right-handed (two-handed backhand)
- Prize money: $19,202

Singles
- Career record: 36–38
- Career titles: 0
- Highest ranking: No. 794 (31 December 2018)
- Current ranking: No. 847 (31 August 2020)

Grand Slam singles results
- French Open Junior: 2R (2019)

Doubles
- Career record: 32–17
- Career titles: 5 ITF
- Highest ranking: No. 503 (9 March 2020)
- Current ranking: No. 508 (31 August 2020)

Grand Slam doubles results
- French Open: 1R (2019)
- Last updated on: 2 September 2020.

Mylène Halemai (born 11 August 2001) is a French professional tennis player and beauty pageant titleholder.

Halemai has a career-high WTA singles ranking of 794, achieved on 31 December 2018. She also has a career-high WTA doubles ranking of 503, reached on 9 March 2020.

Halemai has won five doubles titles on tournaments of the ITF Circuit. She made her main-draw debut on a Grand Slam event at the 2019 French Open, after receiving a wildcard for the doubles competition partnering Julie Belgraver.

In 2020, she was crowned Miss Wallis and Futuna 2020, and represented the region at Miss France 2021.

== Personal life and background ==
Halemai was born in South Durras, New South Wales, Australia to parents Jacob Sakopo Halemai and Michelle Campbell Taylor. Her father is from Wallis and Futuna, a French territorial collectivity in Polynesia, while her mother is an Australian of Aboriginal and Scottish descent. Halemai has four siblings: Thierry, Thelesïa, Khalia, and Aurelia, all of whom have played or play high level tennis. Halemai resided in Australia until age seven, when the family relocated to Narbonne in France, and later to Paris.

In 2020, Halemai competed in Miss Wallis and Futuna 2020, and was crowned as the winner. She represented the region at Miss France 2021 in December 2020, becoming the first entrant from Wallis and Futuna since 2005, and only the sixth ever. Halemai had relocated to Wallis and Futuna to reside with her parents during the COVID-19 pandemic in France, and opted to register for the pageant at the last minute.

== Grand Slam performance timelines ==
Key
W	F	SF	QF	#R	RR	Q#	P#	DNQ	A	Z#	PO	G	S	B	NMS	NTI	P	NH

(W) winner; (F) finalist; (SF) semifinalist; (QF) quarterfinalist; (#R) rounds 4, 3, 2, 1; (RR) round-robin stage; (Q#) qualification round; (P#) preliminary round; (DNQ) did not qualify; (A) absent; (Z#) Davis/Fed Cup Zonal Group (with number indication) or (PO) play-off; (G) gold, (S) silver or (B) bronze Olympic/Paralympic medal; (NMS) not a Masters tournament; (NTI) not a Tier I tournament; (P) postponed; (NH) not held; (SR) strike rate (events won / competed); (W–L) win–loss record.
To avoid confusion and double counting, these charts are updated at the conclusion of a tournament or when the player's participation has ended.

=== Doubles ===
Tournament	2019	2020	SR	W–L	Win %
Australian Open	A	A	0 / 0	0–0	–
French Open	1R		0 / 1	0–1	0%
Wimbledon	A		0 / 0	0–0	–
US Open	A		0 / 0	0–0	–
Win–loss	0–1	0–0	0 / 1	0–1	0%

== ITF Circuit finals ==
=== Doubles: 6 (5 titles, 1 runner–up) ===
Legend $100,000 tournaments $80,000 tournaments $60,000 tournaments $25,000 tournaments (0–1) $15,000 tournaments (3–0)	Finals by surface Hard (5–1) Clay (0–0) Grass (0–0) Carpet (0–0)

Result	W–L	Date	Tournament	Tier	Surface	Partner	Opponents	Score
Win	1–0	Jul 2018	ITF Dijon, France	15,000	Hard	(France) Émeline Dartron	(Romania) Karola Patricia Bejenaru (Germany) Yana Morderger	3–6, 7–6, [10–5]
Win	2–0	Jul 2019	ITF Dijon (2)	15,000	Hard	(France) Laia Petretic	(Belgium) Victoria Kalaitzis (Belgium) Justine Pysson	6–4, 6–4
Loss	2–1	Jan 2020	ITF Petit-Bourg, France (Guadeloupe)	25,000	Hard	(France) Manon Léonard	(Brazil) Laura Pigossi (Netherlands) Rosalie van der Hoek	2–6, 1–6
Win	3–1	Feb 2020	ITF Monastir, Tunisia	15,000	Hard	(France) Manon Léonard	(Romania) Ilona Georgiana Ghioroaie (Russia) Anastasia Pribylova	1–6, 6–3, [10–6]
Win	4–1	Feb 2020	ITF Monastir	15,000	Hard	(France) Julie Belgraver	(Bulgaria) Petia Arshinkova (Bulgaria) Gergana Topalova	2–6, 6–1, [10–4]
Win	5–1	Feb 2020	ITF Monastir	15,000	Hard	(Romania) Andreea Prisăcariu	(Bulgaria) Petia Arshinkova (Bulgaria) Gergana Topalova	6–3, 6–4
