= Junction Point =

Junction Point may refer to:

- Junction point, in the NTFS file system, a symbolic link to a directory that acts as an alias of that directory
- Junction Point, New South Wales, a former gold-mining village in New South Wales, Australia; see List of schools in Illawarra and the South East (New South Wales)
- Junction Point Studios, a former video game developer based in Austin, Texas
