= Elonera Montessori School =

Location
- Mount Ousley; Wollongong, New South Wales, 2519; Australia; 34.403074°S 150.888610°E

Information
- Motto: Happy, Harmonious and Hands-on
- Website: https://elonera.nsw.edu.au

Elonera Montessori School is located in Wollongong, New South Wales.

1973 - Elonera Montessori School, was initially established by parents seeking an independent and alternative primary education for their children in the Illawarra.

1987 - the school formally adopted the Montessori educational philosophy and became a Montessori school.

1990 - saw the addition of a preschool and in 1996 an additional primary class.

2001 - the first high school classes added and by 2010 the school adopted the International Baccalaureate Diploma (IB) qualification for senior students in years 11 and 12. Elonera Montessori School is the only IB World School in the Illawarra.

2016 - the first NIDO class commenced catering for young children aged 18 months to 3 years of age.

Since 2023, the principal is Dr. David McGregor, and the school offers Montessori education from 18 months to 18 years of age.

Elonera Montessori School is a member of Montessori Australia and Independent Schools NSW.

== School grounds ==
Elonera Montessori school is located at 21 Mount Ousley Road, Mount Ousley.

== See also ==
- List of non-government schools in New South Wales
- List of schools in Illawarra and the South East
- Education in Australia
