= Cambewarra Village =

- Town
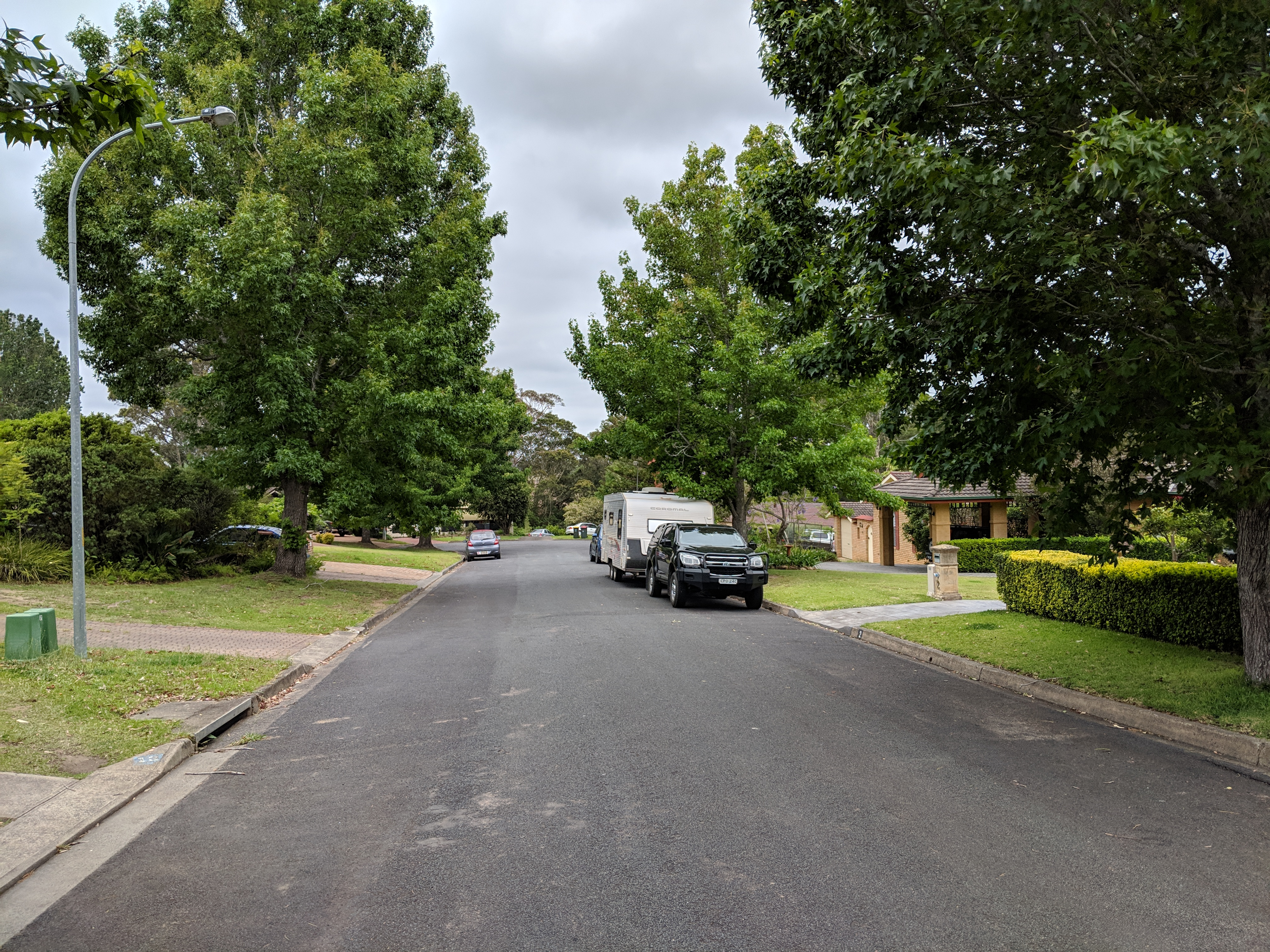

- Coordinates: 34°49′38″S 150°33′30″E
- Country: Australia
- State: New South Wales
- Region: South Coast
- LGA: City of Shoalhaven
- Location: 162 km (101 mi) S of Sydney; 9 km (5.6 mi) NW of Nowra; 19 km (12 mi) SE of Kangaroo Valley; 41 km (25 mi) SW of Kiama

Government
  - State electorate: Kiama
  - Federal division: Gilmore
- Elevation: 70 m (230 ft)

Population
  - Total: 1,211 (SAL 2021)
- Postcode: 2540
- County: Camden
- Parish: Illaroo
Localities around Cambewarra Village
Cambewarra	Cambewarra	Cambewarra
Cambewarra	Cambewarra Village	Cambewarra
Bangalee	Cambewarra	Cambewarra

Cambewarra Village is a locality in the City of Shoalhaven in New South Wales, Australia. It lies on Main Road, which runs west from Cambewarra Road, which forms part of the Kangaroo Valley–Nowra road, about 9 km northwest of Nowra and south of Cambewarra Mountain. At the 2016 census, it had a population of 1,189. Cambewarra Village is largely surrounded by the locality of Cambewarra.
