= Ryan Couchman =

Australian rugby league player

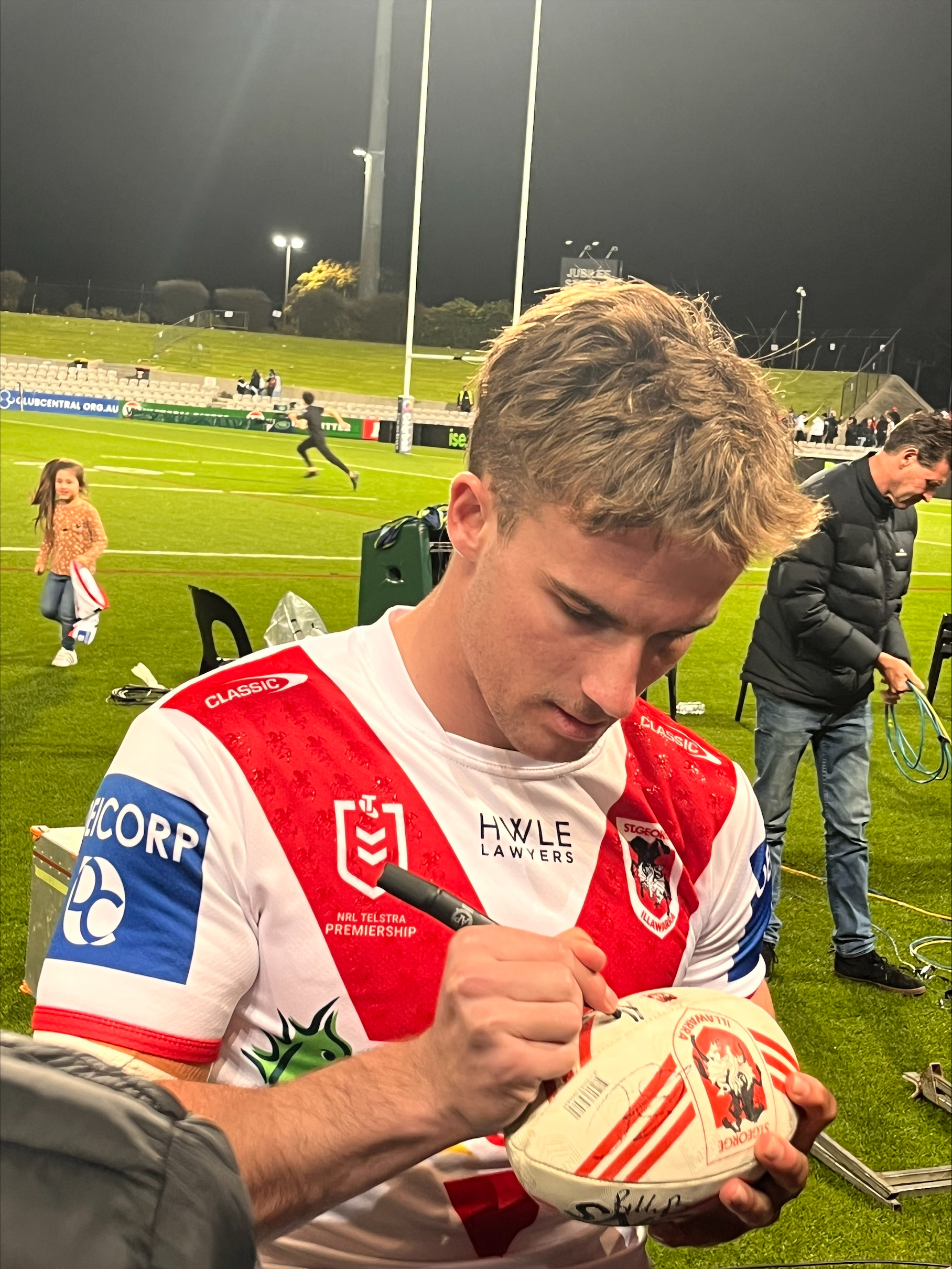

Personal information
- Full name: Ryan Couchman
- Born: 16 September 2003 (age 23) Wollongong, New South Wales, Australia
- Height: 188 cm (6 ft 2 in)
- Weight: 100 kg (15 st 10 lb)

Playing information
- Position: Second-row, Lock
Club
Years	Team	Pld	T	G	FG	P
2023–	St. George Illawarra	32	1	0	0	4
Representative
Years	Team	Pld	T	G	FG	P
2026	Prime Minister's XIII	1	0	0	0	0
- Education: Bulli High School
- Relatives: Toby Couchman (twin brother)

Ryan Couchman (born 16 September 2003) is an Australian professional rugby league footballer who plays as a second-row forward for the St. George Illawarra Dragons in the NRL.

== Background ==
Couchman was born in Wollongong, New South Wales. He has 3 siblings: Toby Couchman (twin brother), Fletcher Couchman and Harvy Couchman. He was educated at Bulli High School and played Junior Rugby League for Thirroul Butchers.

== Playing career ==
=== Early career ===
Ryan played Second Row for NSW CHS at the 2021 ASSRL carnival and his strong performances were rewarded with selection in the Australian Schoolboys Merit Team.

On 12 March 2023, Couchman made his NSW Cup debut against the Canterbury-Bankstown Bulldogs. He has scored 4 tries for the NSW Cup team out of 20 appearances. He played in the second-row.

On 13 March 2023, he and his twin brother Toby both extended their contracts with the Dragons until the end of the 2025 NRL Season.

=== NRL career ===
In round 18 of the 2023 NRL season, Couchman was named as the replacement player for the Dragons in their local derby match with the Cronulla-Sutherland Sharks. He was also named as the replacement player in rounds 19 and 22. In round 23, he made his first grade debut, playing for 37 minutes on the interchange in St. George Illawarra's 26−20 loss to the Parramatta Eels at Western Sydney Stadium.

=== 2024 ===
Couchman played six matches for St. George Illawarra in the 2024 NRL season as the club finished 11th on the table. On 13 November the Dragons announced that Couchman had re-signed with the club on a three year deal.

=== 2025 ===
Couchman played for St. George Illawarra in their round one match against Canterbury-Bankstown but he left the field with a knee injury during the game.

=== 2026 ===
He made his Prime Minister's XIII début on 3 October 2026 in the 10-60 win over PNG Prime Minister's XIII in Port Moresby, together with his twin brother.
