= Durras North =

- Town
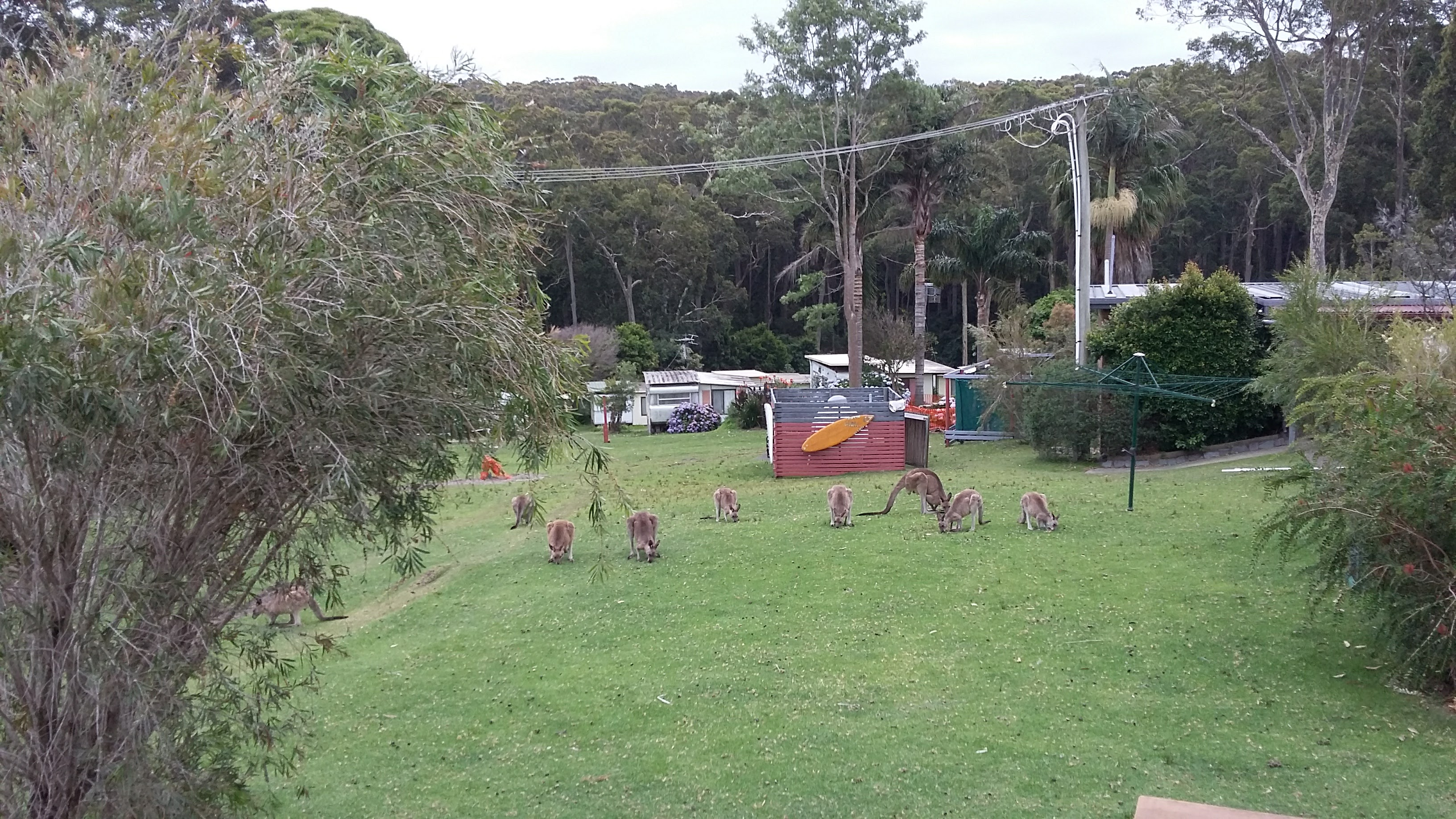
- Durras North camp ground

- Coordinates: 35°37′57″S 150°18′02″E
- Country: Australia
- State: New South Wales
- Region: South Coast
- LGA: City of Shoalhaven
- Location: 280 km (170 mi) S of Sydney; 25 km (16 mi) NE of Batemans Bay

Government
  - State electorate: South Coast
  - Federal division: Gilmore

Population
  - Total: 27 (2016 census)
- Postcode: 2536
- County: St Vincent
- Parish: Kioloa
Localities around Durras North
East Lynne	Pebbly Beach	Depot Beach
East Lynne	Durras North	Tasman Sea
Benandarah	South Durras	Tasman Sea

Durras North is a locality in the City of Shoalhaven in New South Wales, Australia. It lies between the Princes Highway and the Tasman Sea. It is 26 km northeast of Batemans Bay. At the 2016 census, it had a population of 27.

== See also ==
- South Durras, New South Wales
