= Bulli High School =

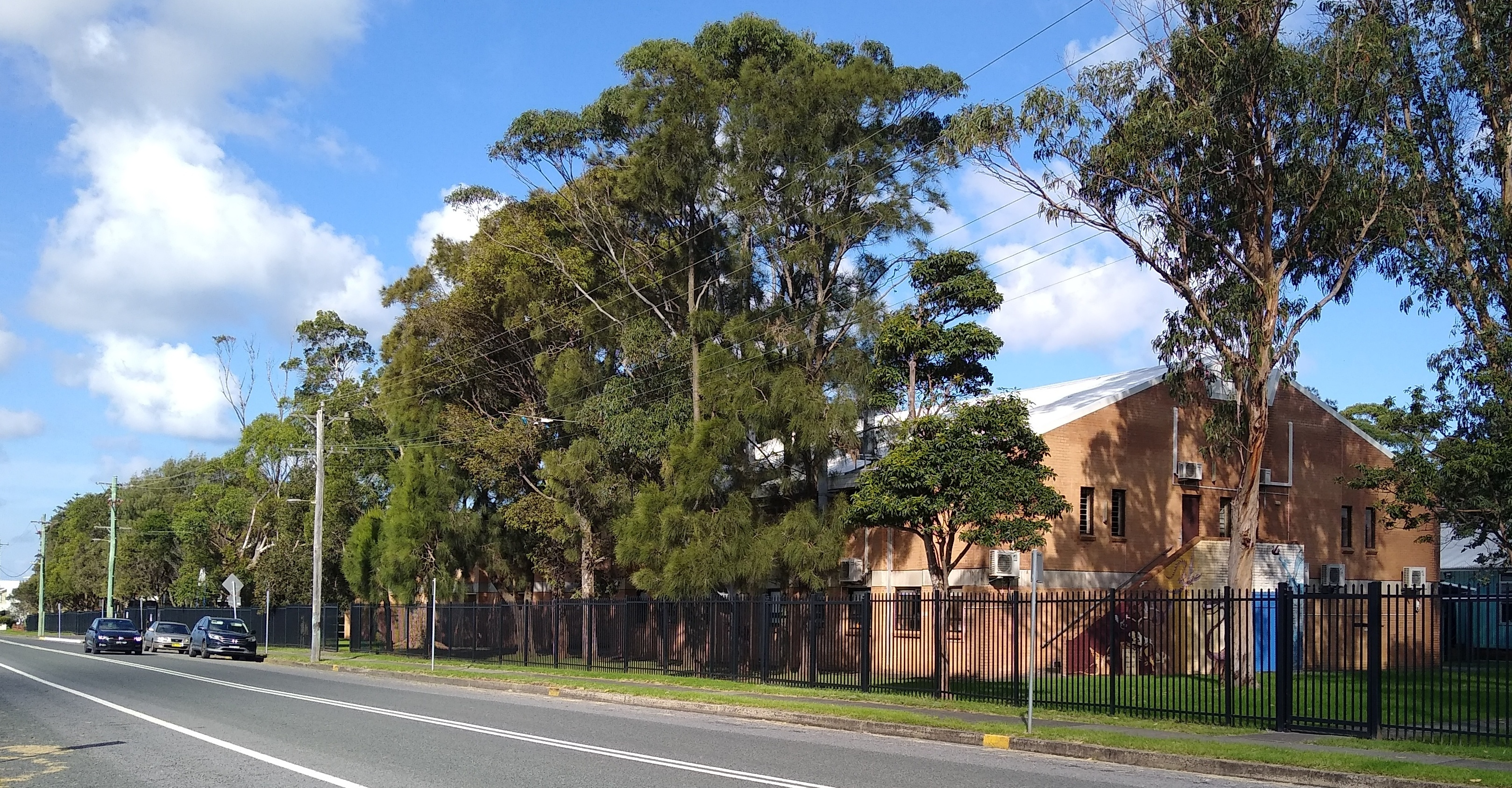

Location
- Ursula Road, Bulli, New South Wales; Australia; 34°20′11″S 150°55′18″E

Information
- Type: Government-funded co-educational comprehensive secondary day school
- Motto: Respect Responsibility Integrity
- School district: Regional South
- Educational authority: New South Wales Department of Education
- Principal: Denise James
- Years: 7–12
- Enrolment: 864 (2018)
- Campus type: Suburban
- Website: bulli-h.schools.nsw.gov.au

Bulli High School is a government-funded co-educational comprehensive secondary day school, located on Ursula Road in Bulli, in the northern Illawarra region of New South Wales, Australia.

In 2018 the school catered for approximately 860 students from Year 7 to Year 12, of whom three percent identified as Indigenous Australians and ten percent were from a language background other than English. The school is operated by the NSW Department of Education. Bulli High School is the only high school in the Seacliff Community of Schools.

== Notable alumni ==
- Nicole Beck – rugby union player
- Ryan Couchman – rugby league player
- Toby Couchman – rugby league player
- Bruce Samazan – actor

== See also ==
- List of government schools in New South Wales: A–F
- List of schools in Illawarra and the South East
- Education in Australia
