= Cambewarra, New South Wales =

Cambewarra
- Town
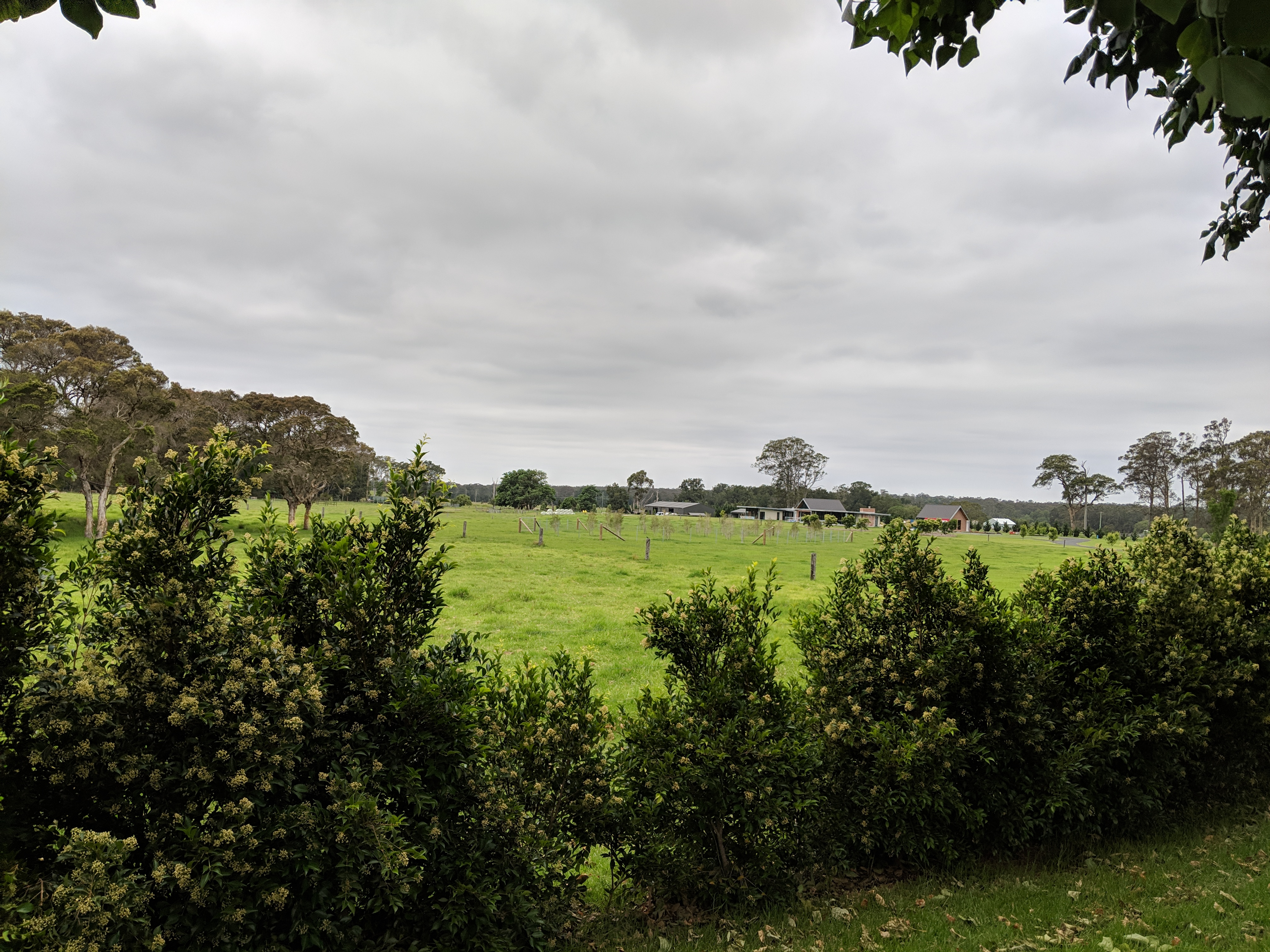

- Coordinates: 34°49′57″S 150°34′02″E
- Country: Australia
- State: New South Wales
- Region: South Coast
- LGA: City of Shoalhaven
- Location: 160 km (99 mi) S of Sydney; 11 km (6.8 mi) NW of Nowra; 18 km (11 mi) SE of Kangaroo Valley; 39 km (24 mi) SW of Kiama

Government
  - State electorate: Kiama
  - Federal division: Gilmore
- Elevation: 77 m (253 ft)

Population
  - Total: 234 (SAL 2021)
- Postcode: 2540
- County: Camden
- Parish: Illaroo
Localities around Cambewarra
Tapitallee	Beaumont	Bellawongarah
Cambewarra Village	Cambewarra	Meroo Meadow
Bangalee	North Nowra	Bomaderry

Cambewarra is located in New South Wales, Australia. It lies on the Kangaroo Valley–Nowra road, about 11 km northwest of Nowra and south of Cambewarra Mountain in the City of Shoalhaven local government area. At the 2016 census, it had a population of 238. Cambewarra is a largely rural area, which surrounds Cambewarra Village.
