= St John the Evangelist Catholic High School, Nowra =

St John the Evangelist Catholic High School
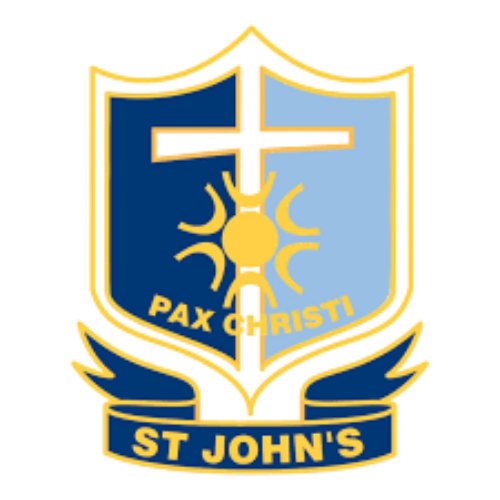
- School Crest

Location
- 31 John Purcell Way, Nowra NSW 2541; Nowra, New South Wales; Australia; 34°53′47″S 150°36′21″E

Information
- Other name: St John's
- Type: Independent co-educational secondary day school
- Motto: Latin: Pax Christi (Peace of Christ)
- Denomination: Roman Catholic
- Patron saint: Saint John the Evangelist
- Established: 1990; 36 years ago
- Founder: Sisters of the Good Samaritan
- Status: Open
- Oversight: Roman Catholic Diocese of Wollongong
- School code: 838
- Principal: James Eirth
- Assistant Principal: Lisa Murphy
- Years: 7–12
- Enrolment: c. 1,000+
- Campus type: Regional
- Song: Pax Christi
- Feeder schools: St Michael's Catholic Primary School
- Website: sjedow.catholic.edu.au

St John the Evangelist Catholic High School, or the colloquial St John's, is an independent co-educational secondary day school, located in Nowra, New South Wales, Australia. The school provides a religious and general education to Catholic and non-Catholic families. Administered by the Catholic Education Office of the Diocese of Wollongong, the Catholic systemic school caters for students from Year 7 to Year 12 and serves the Shoalhaven and surrounding regions.

St John's has approximately 1,000+ students, most of whom come from Catholic families.

== History ==
St John's was founded in 1990. Up until 1967 there was a Catholic secondary school provided at St Michael's school, but it was closed and Catholic students then had to attend the local state high schools, Shoalhaven High School and Nowra High School, with some families opting to send their children to the Catholic boarding school in the Southern Highlands, Chevalier College.

St John the Evangelist High School was founded in 1990. The first principal was Carmel Bambridge. The Sisters of the Good Samaritan had worked in the Nowra Parish since 1893, particularly in the area of the Catholic Education in St Michael's School and State Schools of the region. The Good Samaritans were founded in 1857 by Archbishop John Bede Polding to work with convict women, and then moved into the field of Catholic Education. Polding's patron saint was St John the Evangelist, and as a Benedictine monk he adapted the rule of St Benedict for the Good Samaritan Congregation. The official feast day for the school is that of St John the Evangelist which is celebrated on 27 December each year. Since this falls during the summer school holidays, the feast day is celebrated near Pentecost.

== House system ==
Benedict – Yellow (formerly Cuthbert)
Originally named after Australian athlete Betty Cuthbert, the House name was changed in 2005. Named after St Benedict.

Chisholm – Red (formerly Bradman)
Originally named after Australian cricketer Donald Bradman, the House name was changed in 2005. Named after Caroline Chisholm.

MacKillop – Purple
Formed in 2005 as the fifth house and named after St. Mary MacKillop, the founder of the Sisters of St Joseph of the Sacred Heart

McCabe – Blue (formerly Goolagong)
Originally named after Australian tennis player Evonne Goolagong Cawley, the House name was changed in 2005. Named after Bishop Thomas McCabe, the first Bishop of the Catholic Diocese of Wollongong.

Polding – Orange
Formed in 2006 as the sixth house and named after Archbishop John Polding, the first Roman Catholic Bishop in Australia and founder of the Sisters of the Good Samaritan.

Purcell – Green (formerly Elliott)
Originally named after Australian athlete Herb Elliott, the House name was changed in 2005. Named after Monsignor John Purcell, the Parish Priest at the time of the schools' opening and one of the founders of the school.

== See also ==
- List of Catholic schools in New South Wales
- Catholic education in Australia
