= Batemans Bay High School =

Location
- Beach Road, Batehaven, Batemans Bay; South Coast, New South Wales; Australia; 35°43′45″S 150°11′41″E

Information
- Type: Government-funded co-educational comprehensive secondary day school
- Motto: Bridge to the Future
- Established: 1988; 38 years ago
- School district: Batemans Bay
- Educational authority: NSW Department of Education
- Principal: Paula Hambly
- Teaching staff: 63.9 FTE (2018)
- Years: 7–12
- Enrolment: 695 (2018)
- Colours: Red, white and black
- Website: batemansba-h.schools.nsw.gov.au

Batemans Bay High School is a government-funded co-educational comprehensive secondary day school, located in Batehaven, a suburb of Batemans Bay, in the South Coast region of New South Wales, Australia.

Established in 1988, the school enrolled approximately 700 students in 2018, from Year 7 to Year 12, of whom 16 percent identified as Indigenous Australians and four percent were from a language background other than English. The school is operated by the NSW Department of Education; the principal is Paula Hambly.

== Principals ==
Ordinal	Officeholder	Term start	Term end	Time in office	Notes
1	Stuart Hooper	1988	1996	7–8 years	
2	Kevin Connell	1997	1999	1–2 years	
3	Mark Smith	1999	2003	3–4 years	
4	Neil Simpson	2003	2015	11–12 years	
5	Greg McDonald	2015	2019	3–4 years	
6	Paula Hambly	2019	Incumbent	6–7 years	

== Notable alumni ==
- Ben Cross – rugby league football player; represented NSW Blues
- Brandon McClelland – actor on stage, television and film

== See also ==
- List of government schools in New South Wales (A-B)
- List of schools in Illawarra and the South East
- Education in Australia
