= Shoalhaven Zoo =

- Interactive map of Shoalhaven Zoo
- 34.8704°S 150.5681°E
- Location: 23 Rockhill Road, North Nowra, New South Wales, Australia
- Land area: 16 acres (6.5 ha)
- Website: shoalhavenzoo.com.au

Shoalhaven Zoo, formerly the Nowra Animal Park, is an animal park on the South Coast of New South Wales, Australia.

Shoalhaven Zoo is the largest native animal park on the NSW South Coast and holds over 100 species of mostly native mammals, birds and reptiles. The park is set in 16 acres (6.5 ha) of native bushland and is situated on the Shoalhaven River.

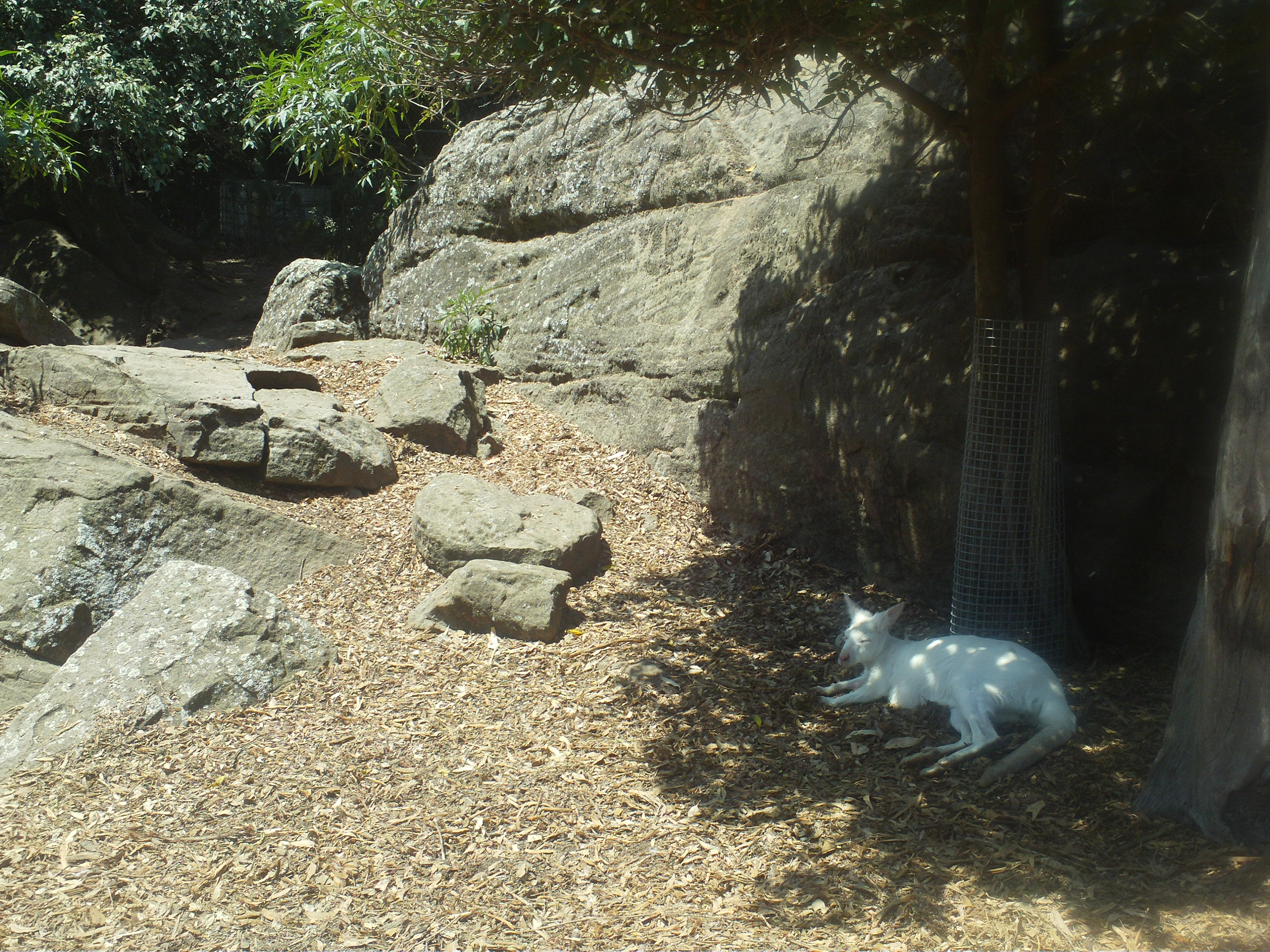
Albino red-necked wallaby

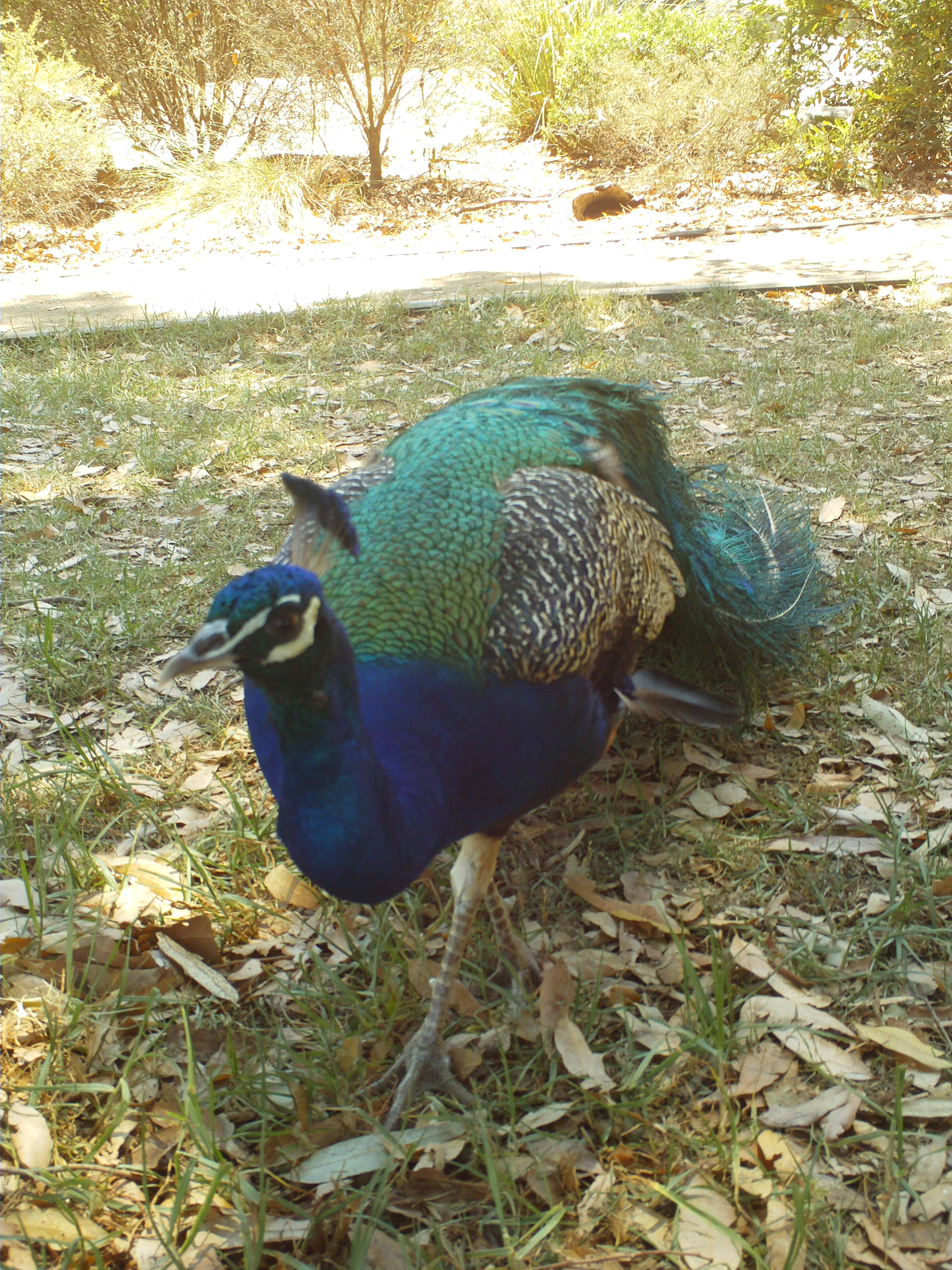
Indian peafowl

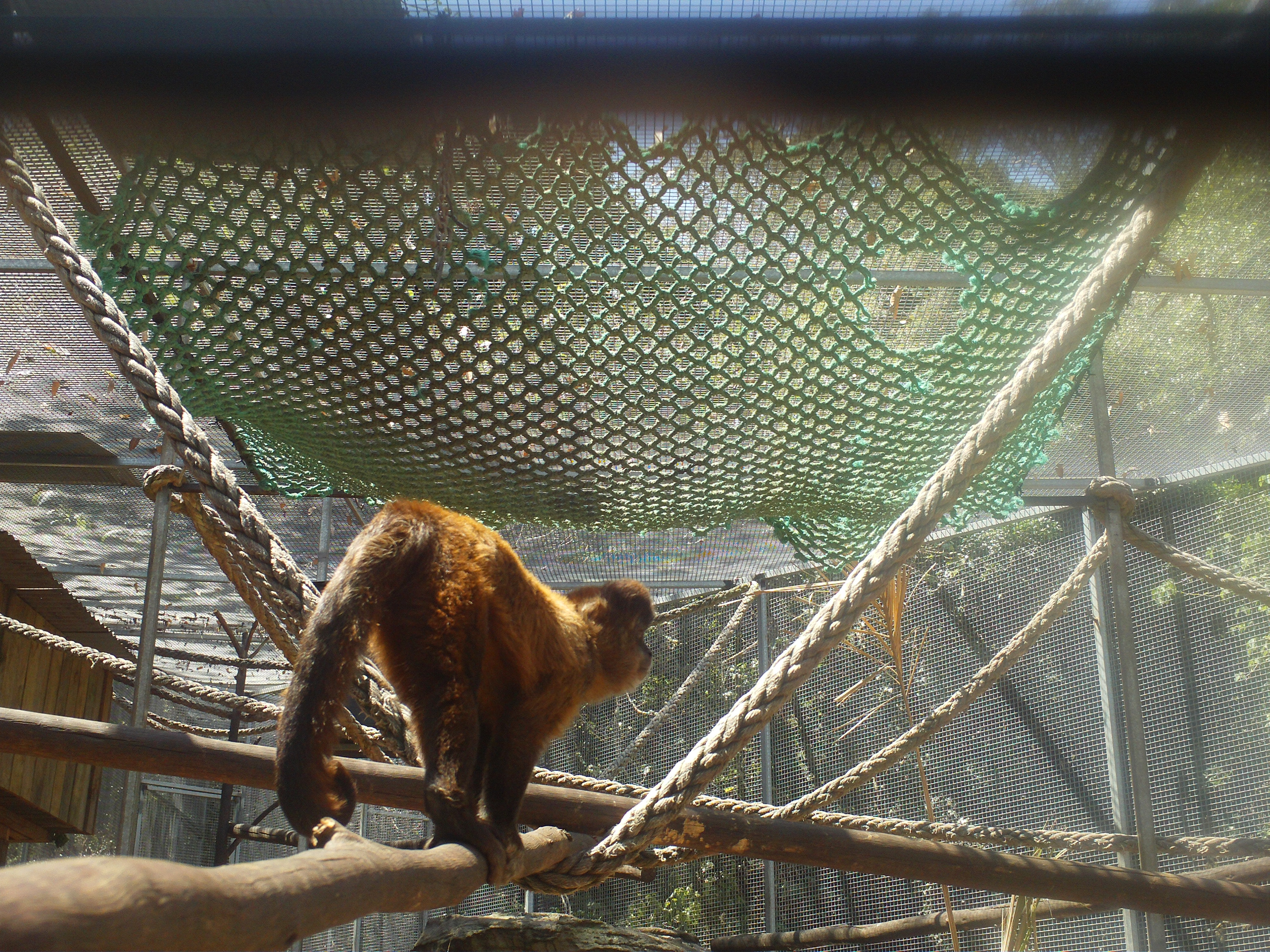
Tufted capuchin monkey

== List of animals ==
Birds

- Australian king parrot
- Blue-and-gold macaw
- Blue-winged kookaburra
- Buff-banded rail
- Bush stone-curlew
- Chestnut-breasted mannikin
- Crimson rosella
- Domestic goose
- Eastern rosella
- Eclectus parrot
- Emu
- Galah
- Gouldian finch
- Indian peafowl
- Laughing kookaburra
- Major Mitchell's cockatoo
- Masked lapwing
- Musk lorikeet
- Rainbow lorikeet
- Southern cassowary
- Star finch
- Sulphur-crested cockatoo
- White-browed woodswallow
- Yellow-tailed black cockatoo

Mammals

- African lion (including white coated)
- Agile wallaby
- Bare-nosed wombat
- Capybara
- Common marmoset
- Cotton-top tamarin
- Dromedary camel
- Eastern grey kangaroo
- Eastern wallaroo
- Goat
- Golden lion tamarin
- Guinea pig
- Horse
- Koala
- Maned wolf
- Meerkat
- Pig
- Quokka
- Rabbit
- Red kangaroo
- Red-necked wallaby (including albino)
- Red-rumped agouti
- Short-beaked echidna
- Southern hairy-nosed wombat
- Spotted-tailed quoll
- Swamp wallaby
- Tufted capuchin monkey
- Western grey kangaroo

Reptiles

- Alligator snapping turtle
- American alligator
- Aldabra giant tortoise
- Carpet python
- Centralian blue-tongued lizard
- Corn snake
- Eastern bearded dragon
- Eastern blue-tongued lizard
- Eastern long-necked turtle
- Elongated tortoise
- Fierce snake
- Frilled lizard
- Lace monitor
- Leopard tortoise
- Olive python
- Reticulated python (albino)
- Ridge-tailed monitor
- Saltwater crocodile
- Veiled chameleon
