= Toby Couchman =

Australian rugby league footballer

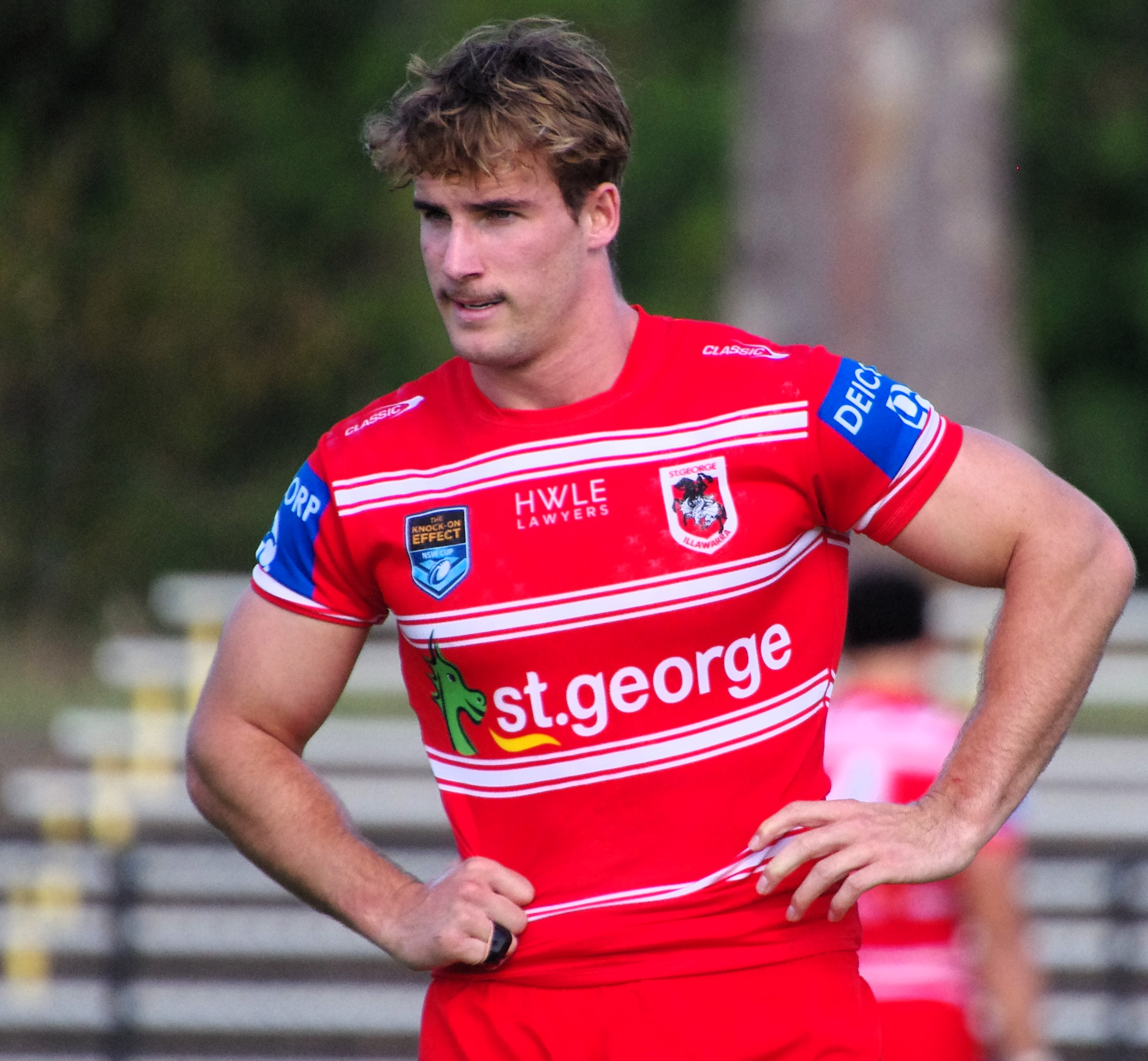

Personal information
- Full name: Toby Couchman
- Born: 16 September 2003 (age 23) Wollongong, New South Wales, Australia
- Height: 188 cm (6 ft 2 in)
- Weight: 102 kg (16 st 1 lb)

Playing information
- Position: Prop
Club
| Years | Team | Pld | T | G | FG | P |
|---|---|---|---|---|---|---|
| 2023– | St. George Illawarra | 61 | 4 | 0 | 0 | 16 |
Representative
| Years | Team | Pld | T | G | FG | P |
| 2026 | Prime Minister's XIII | 1 | 0 | 0 | 0 | 0 |
- Education: Bulli High School
- Relatives: Ryan Couchman (twin brother)

Toby Couchman (born 16 September 2003) is an Australian professional rugby league footballer who plays as a prop for the St. George Illawarra Dragons in the National Rugby League (NRL).

== Background ==
Couchman was born in Wollongong, New South Wales. He has three siblings, Ryan (twin brother), Harvy and Fletcher. He was educated at Bulli High School. He played junior rugby league for Thirroul Butchers.

== Playing career ==
=== Early career ===
Couchman was contracted to the St. George Illawarra Dragons as a junior coming through the ranks through the academy system alongside his twin brother Ryan Couchman. In June 2022, while playing in the Jersey Flegg Cup for the Dragons, Couchman was selected to represent New South Wales in the Under 19's State of Origin match against Queensland.

=== St. George Illawarra Dragons ===
In round 2 of the 2023 NRL season, Couchman made his first grade debut for the St. George Illawarra Dragons in place of the injured Jack de Belin in his side's 32−18 victory over the Gold Coast Titans at Jubilee Oval. Following this, Couchman had his contract extended through the 2025 season. Couchman would play a total of 15 games for the club in the 2023 NRL season as they finished 16th on the table. Couchman played eleven matches for St. George Illawarra in the 2024 NRL season as the club finished 11th on the table. On 13 November the St. George club announced that the Couchman brothers had re-signed with the club on a three-year deal. In the 2025 NRL season, Couchman played 13 games as the club finished 15th on the table.

=== Representative ===
He made his Prime Minister's XIII début on 3 October 2026 in the 10-60 win over PNG Prime Minister's XIII in Port Moresby.

== Statistics ==
| Year | Team | Games | Tries | Pts |
|---|---|---|---|---|
| 2023 | St. George Illawarra Dragons | 15 | 2 | 8 |
| 2024 | St. George Illawarra Dragons | 11 | 2 | 8 |
| 2025 | St. George Illawarra Dragons | 13 | - | - |
| 2026 | St. George Illawarra Dragons | 8 | - | - |
| 2027 | St. George Illawarra Dragons | | | |
| | Totals | 47 | 4 | 16 |
