= Vincentia High School =

Location
- Vincentia, New South Wales; Australia; 35°4′40″S 150°39′54″E

Information
- Type: Government-funded co-educational comprehensive secondary day school
- Motto: "Learning for life"
- Established: 1993; 33 years ago
- Educational authority: NSW Department of Education
- Principal: Ruth Winfield
- Teaching staff: 89.6 FTE (2018)
- Years: 7–12
- Enrolment: 1,026 (2018)
- Campus type: Regional
- Colours: Grey, white, maroon
- Website: vincentia-h.schools.nsw.gov.au

Vincentia High School is a government-funded co-educational comprehensive secondary day school, located in the town of Vincentia in the South Coast region of New South Wales, Australia. The school is located adjacent to Jervis Bay.

Established in 1993, the school enrolled approximately 1,000 students in 2018, from Year 7 to Year 12, of whom 16 percent identified as Indigenous Australians and five percent were from a language background other than English. The school is operated by the NSW Department of Education. In 2025, the Minns Labor Government revealed plans for improved facilities and classrooms by 2027, including a two-storey building with 15 permanent classrooms.

== See also ==
- List of government schools in New South Wales
- List of schools in Illawarra and the South East
- Education in Australia
