= Bangalee, New South Wales =

Bangalee
- Suburb
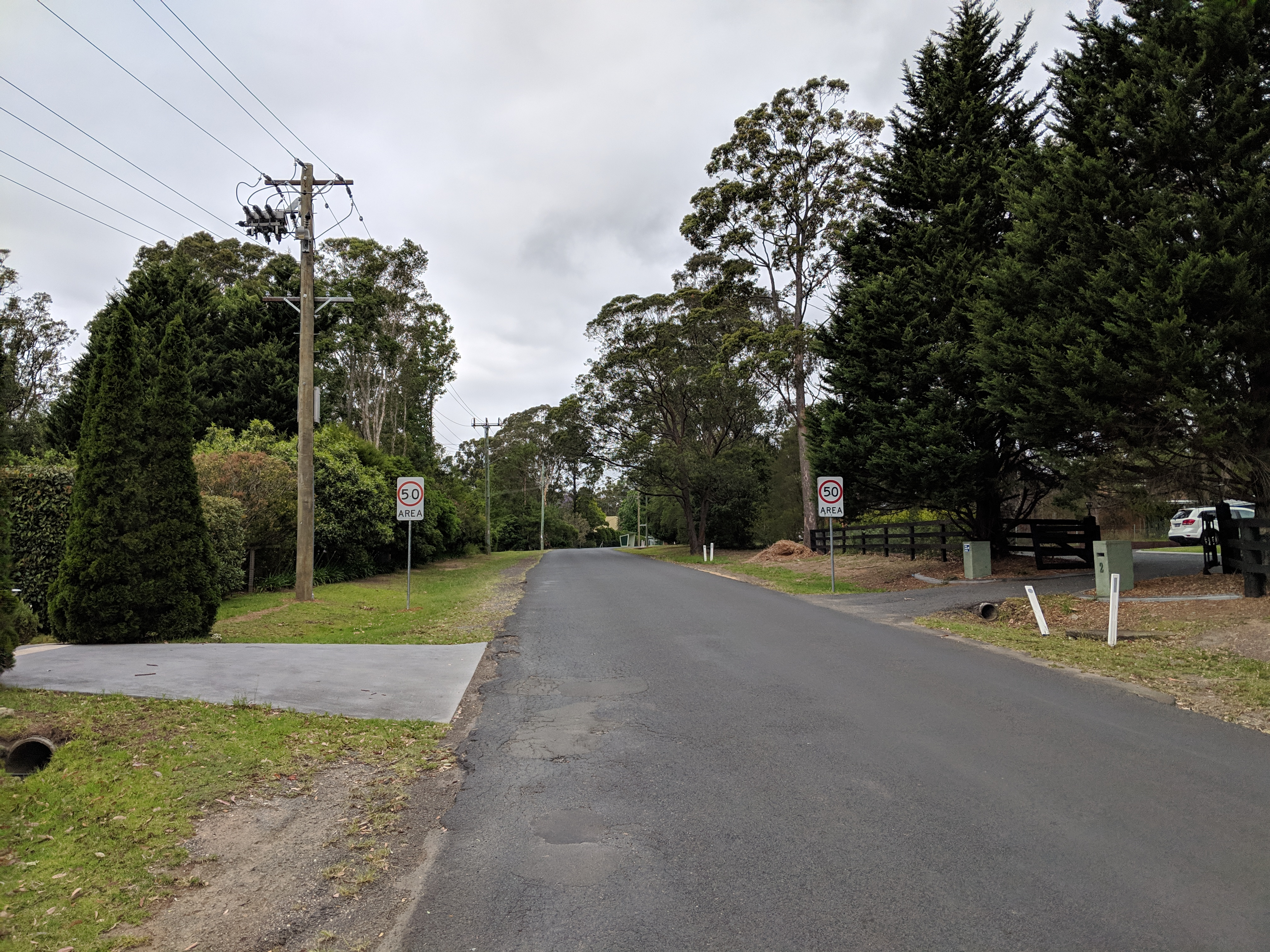

- Coordinates: 34°50′34″S 150°33′06″E
- Country: Australia
- State: New South Wales
- Region: South Coast
- LGA: City of Shoalhaven
- Location: 163 km (101 mi) S of Sydney; 8 km (5.0 mi) NW of Nowra; 21 km (13 mi) SW of Berry

Government
  - State electorate: Kiama
  - Federal division: Gilmore
- Elevation: 53 m (174 ft)

Population
  - Total: 657 (2016 census)
- Postcode: 2541
- County: Camden
- Parish: Illaroo
Suburbs around Bangalee
| Cambewarra | Cambewarra | Cambewarra |
| Tapitallee | Bangalee | North Nowra |
| Watersleigh | North Nowra | North Nowra |

Bangalee is a suburb of Nowra in the City of Shoalhaven in New South Wales, Australia. It lies north of the Shoalhaven about seven km to the northwest of Nowra. At the 2016 census, it had a population of 657.

Bangalee is an Aboriginal name meaning "sandy beach" and was the original name for the Shoalhaven River. Bangalee was also a name "used by Cliff Richards for his pleasure grounds which were situated near where [Bengalee] Creek runs into the Shoalhaven River".
