= Nowra High School =

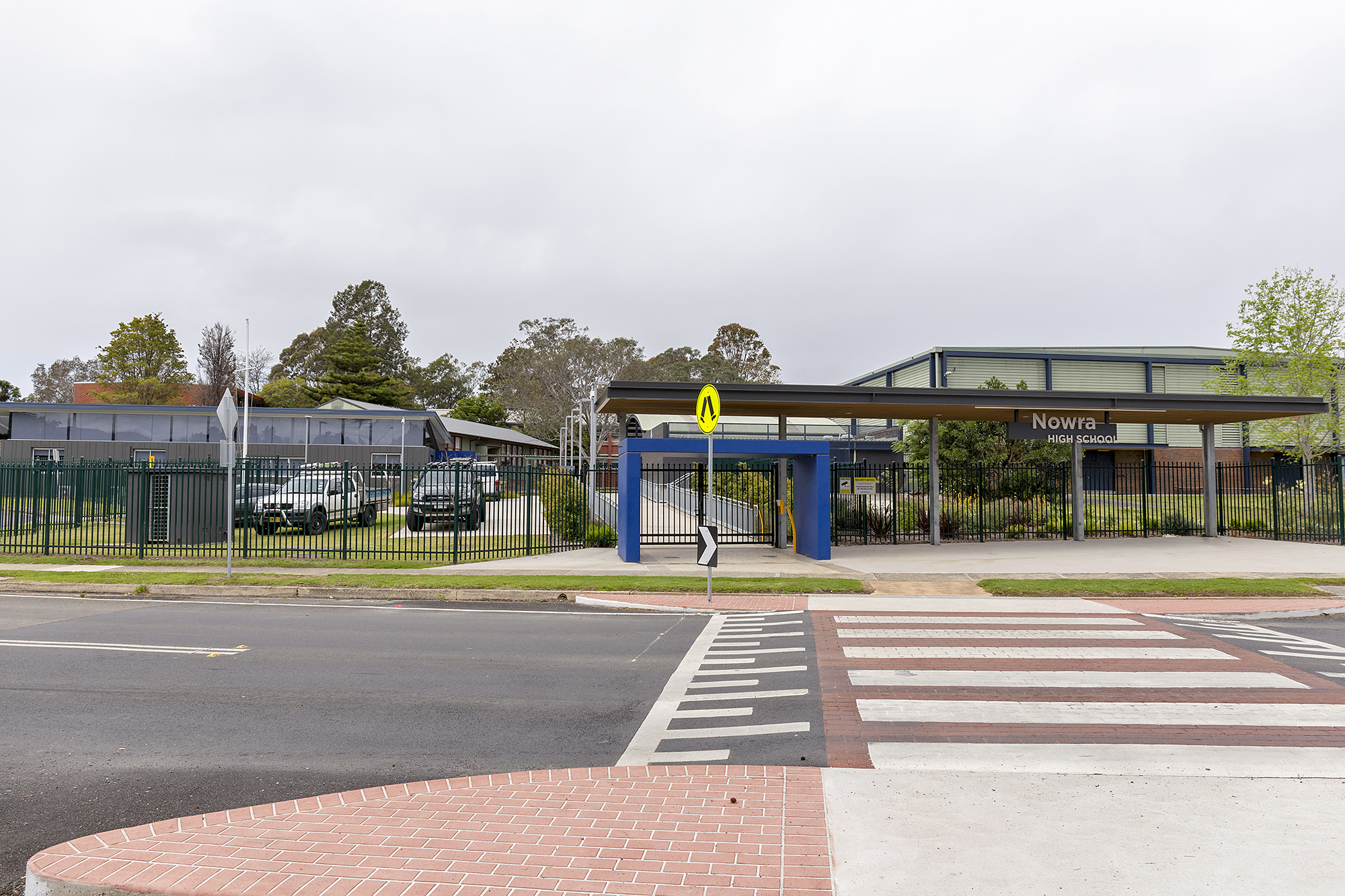
- Entrance to the school, pictured in 2018

Location
- Nowra, New South Wales; Australia; 34°52′17″S 150°36′37″E

Information
- Type: Government-funded co-educational comprehensive secondary day school
- Motto: Wisdom through knowledge
- Established: 1956; 70 years ago
- School district: South Coast
- Educational authority: New South Wales Department of Education
- Principal: Renee Gilbert
- Teaching staff: 69.6 FTE (2018)
- Years: 7–12
- Enrolment: 916 (2018)
- Campus: Regional
- Colours: Navy blue, sky blue, and white
- Website: nowra-h.schools.nsw.gov.au

Nowra High School is a government-funded co-educational comprehensive secondary day school, located in Nowra, in the South Coast region of New South Wales, Australia.

Established in 1956, the school enrolled approximately 910 students in 2018, from Year 7 to Year 12, of whom eleven percent identified as Indigenous Australians and seven percent were from a language background other than English. The school is operated by the NSW Department of Education; the Principal is Renee Gilbert. The school motto is "Wisdom Through Knowledge".

== Overview ==
On 17 May 2007 the Governor-General hosted a meeting in the school with indigenous students from the city's high schools.

== Notable alumni ==
- Anna Bligh AC – a former politician and Premier of Queensland who spent the last six months of her schooling at Nowra High
- Fiona Phillips – federal MP
- Karen Phillips- Olympic swimmer
- Maddy Collier- AFLW player

=== Notable former staff ===
- Brian McGowan – a teacher during the 1960s; and a former member of the NSW Legislative Assembly

== See also ==
- List of government schools in New South Wales: G–P
- List of schools in Illawarra and the South East
- Education in Australia
