= Murramarang National Park =

National park in Australia

- IUCN category II (national park)
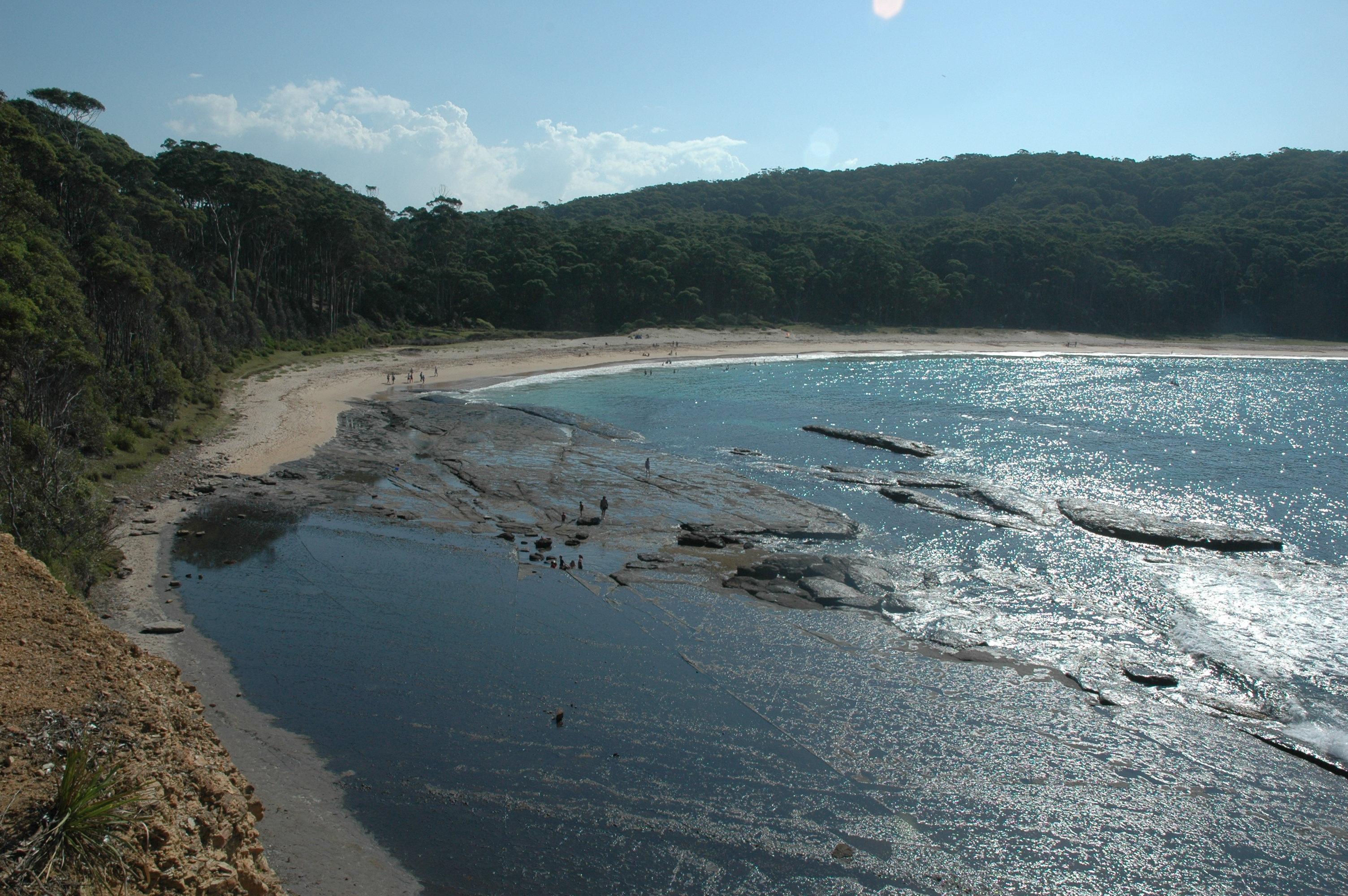
- Depot Beach

- Location within New South Wales
- Location: New South Wales
- Nearest city: Batemans Bay
- Coordinates: 35°36′04″S 150°19′52″E
- Area: 121 km^{2} (47 sq mi)
- Established: 4 May 1973
- Governing body: National Parks and Wildlife Service (New South Wales)

Murramarang is a national park in New South Wales, Australia, 206 km (128 mi) southwest of Sydney. It follows the coastline from Long Beach north to Merry Beach near Ulladulla. It is surrounded by three state forests, Kioloa, South Brooman, and Benandarrah. The park forms part of the Ulladulla to Merimbula Important Bird Area, identified as such by BirdLife International because of its importance for swift parrots.

Murramarang National Park is of great cultural and historical significance for Aboriginal people.

== Access and facilities ==
There are several entrances to the park off the Princes Highway. There are two major entrances, at the northern end via Bawley Point and Merry Beach, and in the southern section off the highway near East Lynne to Pebbly Beach and Durras North. Roads in the park are generally unsealed. A campground is located just in the bush behind the beach.

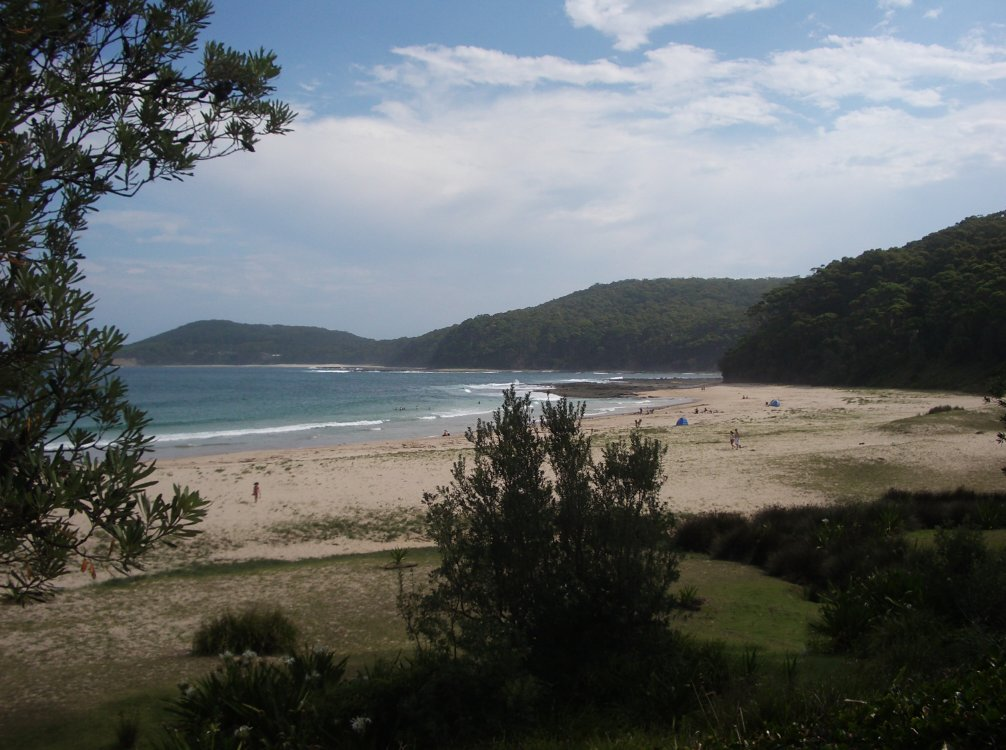
Pebbly Beach in the Murramarang National Park

=== Attractions ===
- Pebbly Beach, one of the park's major attractions, lies between two headlands and forms a sand beach used for bathing and surfing, followed by hilly grassland towards the bush.
- Kangaroos graze close to the beach. Birds, including parrots, are plentiful. Goannas live in the area.
- Walks and dives along the headlands.
- Tidal rock pools.
- Wasp Head, Depot, Pebbly, and Merry Beaches are popular surfing spots. These beaches also include numerous walking trails.
- Myrtle Beach is a popular beach for nudists.
- Durras Mountain includes a steep but enjoyable hiking trail.
- Murramarang Aboriginal Area is located in the northern region of the park, and it encompasses the largest midden on the south coast.

== See also ==
- Protected areas of New South Wales
