= Numbugga, New South Wales =

Numbugga New South Wales
- Population: 125 (2016 census)
- Postcode(s): 2550
- Elevation: 156 m (512 ft)
- LGA(s): Bega Valley Shire
- State electorate(s): Bega
- Federal division(s): Eden-Monaro

Numbugga (36°39′S 149°42′E), New South Wales, Australia, is a locality about 15 km from the town of Bega, in Bega Valley Shire, consisting of mainly farmland, rural residential dwellings and National Parks. At the 2016 census, Numbugga had a population of 125 people.

== History ==
Numbugga was settled around the same times as the nearby towns of Bega and Bemboka. The present route of the Snowy Mountains Highway follows the old route, except for a few deviations that are now roads in their own right, such as Coopers Gully Road and Garfield Road. The area used to have three schools until the mid-1970s. A hall used to stand close to the location of the current Numbugga Bushfire Brigade shed. The Numbugga Bushfire Brigade is part of the NSW RFS

== Photo gallery ==
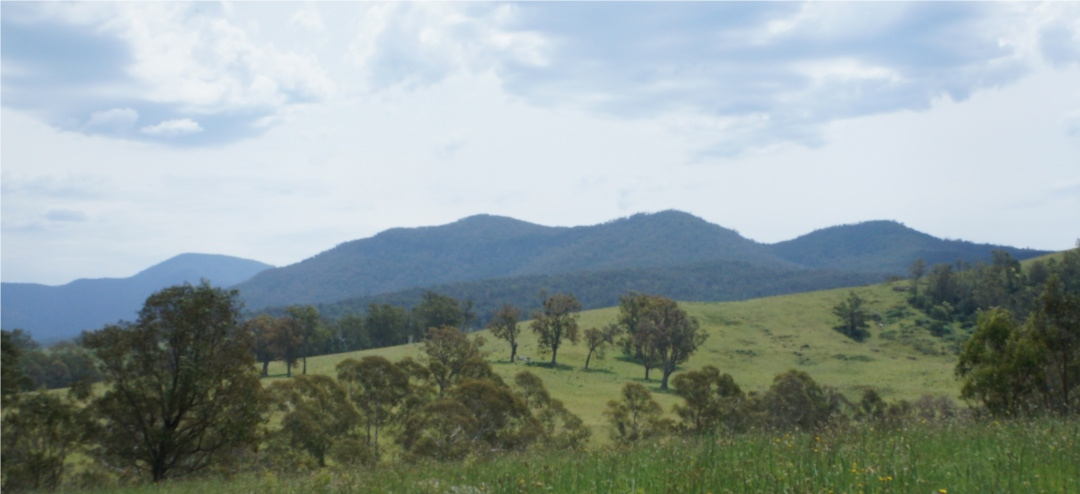
Part of the Numbugga Walls mountain range
