= Bendeela, New South Wales =

Coordinates: 34°44′5.88″S 150°28′45.22″E

Bendeela is a historical locality near the Southern Highlands of New South Wales, Australia, in City of Shoalhaven. It is located to the west of Kangaroo Valley.
