= South Durras, New South Wales =

South Durras
- Town
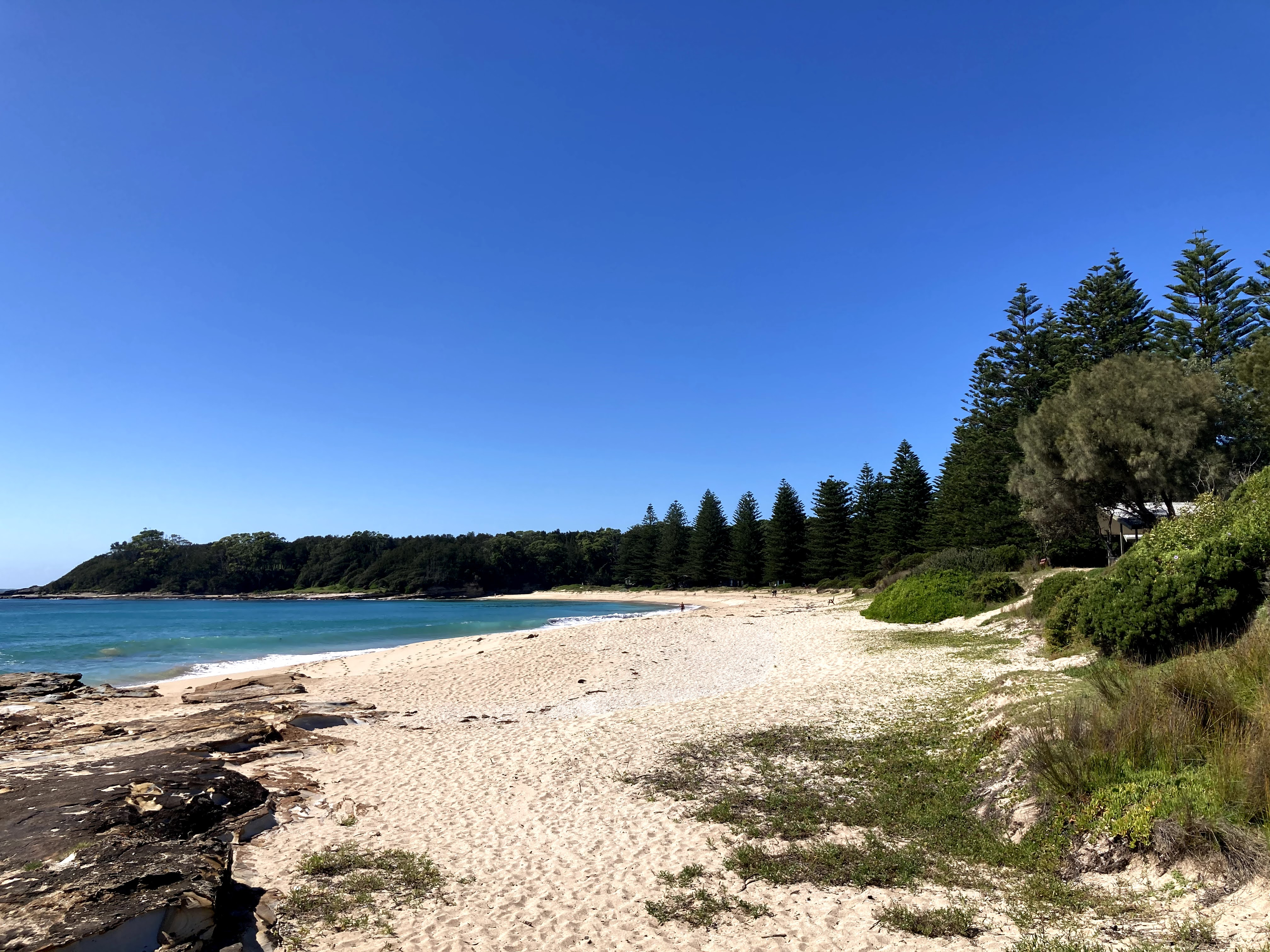
- Mill Beach in South Durras

- Coordinates: 35°39′44″S 150°17′32″E
- Country: Australia
- State: New South Wales
- Region: South Coast
- LGA: Eurobodalla Shire
- Location: 280 km (170 mi) SSW of Sydney; 151 km (94 mi) ESE of Canberra
- Established: 1937

Government
  - State electorate: Bega
  - Federal division: Gilmore

Area
  - Total: 3.214 km^{2} (1.241 sq mi)
- Elevation: 25 m (82 ft)

Population
  - Total: 341 (2016 census)
  - Density: 106.10/km^{2} (274.8/sq mi)
- Postcode: 2536
- Mean max temp: 24.1 °C (75.4 °F)
- Mean min temp: 5.9 °C (42.6 °F)
- Annual rainfall: 956.8 mm (37.67 in)

South Durras is a small village on the South Coast of New South Wales, Australia. South Durras is located approximately 280 kilometres south of Sydney and 15 kilometres north of Batemans Bay, in the local government area of Eurobodalla Shire. The village is surrounded by the Murramarang National Park.

== History ==
Prior to white settlement, South Durras was home to the Yuin people whose land covered much of the South Coast of New South Wales. Just north of South Durras in the Murramarang Aboriginal Area is what is believed to be the largest midden on the South Coast. While there was some initial hostility between the Yuin and the white settlers, introduced diseases such as smallpox killed off around 95% of the tribe, leaving them in no state to fight for their land.

The first land grant in the area was made to John Whitehead McNee in 1840 and the name Durras was in use at that time to describe the area. For the next ninety years or so, the area was primarily used for timber cutting with a mill in operation at Wasp Head but the mill's closure in 1929 caused a reappraisal of the area's potential. The land south of Durras Creek was subdivided in 1937 to form the village of Durras which didn't become known as South Durras until the establishment of another settlement north of Durras Lake. In the 1940s and 50s, a school, post office and store were established in the town with electricity introduced in 1960.

== Coastal locations ==
The southern end of the wide bay is known as Beagle Bay, which includes two beaches (Mills Beach and Cookies Beach) and extends south to Wasp Head, a famous geological site, marking the southern boundary of the Sydney Basin sediments. On the southern side of Wasp Head is Wobbegong Bay.

== Attractions ==
- Murramarang National Park is adjacent to South Durras.
- The beach at South Durras features tidal rock pools. Kangaroos graze close to the beach. Wildlife is plentiful, including parrots and goannas.
- A campground is located just in the bush behind the beach.

== Population ==
At the 2016 census, South Durras had a population of 341. In the summer months the population swells substantially.

== Radio stations ==
- East Coast Radio 2EC 105.9 FM (commercial)
- POWERFM NSW South Coast 104.3 FM (commercial)
- Eurobodalla Community Radio 107.5 FM
- ABC South-East 103.5 FM
- ABC Radio National 105.1 FM
- ABC Classic 101.9 FM
- Triple J 98.9 FM (from the adjacent Illawarra region). A local service from Mount Wandera is planned, subject to the clearance of local analogue television stations.

== Climate ==
The climate of South Durras is moderated by the sea, with warm summers and mild sunny winters. Nights can be cold in winter. Thunderstorms can occur between November and March, with rainfall maximums in summer.

Climate Table
	Jan	Feb	Mar	Apr	May	Jun	Jul	Aug	Sep	Oct	Nov	Dec	Year
Mean daily maximum temperature (°C)	23.9	24.1	23.3	21.6	19.1	16.8	16.1	17.1	18.6	20.1	21.4	22.8	20.4
Mean daily minimum temperature (°C)	16.0	16.3	15.1	12.3	9.4	7.2	5.9	6.5	8.4	10.7	12.8	14.7	11.3
Mean total rainfall (mm)	97.3	93.6	108.9	89.1	85.9	86.5	55.9	54.3	61.6	77.3	76.1	74.2	960.6
Mean number of rain days	10.8	9.9	10.3	8.8	8.0	7.7	6.9	7.1	8.5	10.1	10.5	10.7	109.4
Source: Bureau of Meteorology Records For Moruya Heads, 20km South of Bateman's Bay

== See also ==
- Durras North

== Sources ==
- South Coast Secrets - Batemans Bay
- Protected areas of New South Wales (Australia)
- NPWS page
- 2002 NPWS Plan of Management
- The Heritage of Australia, Macmillan Company, 1981, pp. 2/148, 2/164.
- Guide to New South Wales National Parks, National Parks and Wildlife Service of New South Wales, 2002, p. 45
