= Myra Vale, New South Wales =

Village in New South Wales, Australia

Coordinates: 34°38′55″S 150°30′55″E

Myra Vale is a small village in the Southern Highlands of New South Wales, Australia, in Wingecarribee Shire.

The population is about 500 including the villages of Avoca and Fitzroy Falls.
