= North Nowra =

Suburb in New South Wales, Australia

- Suburb
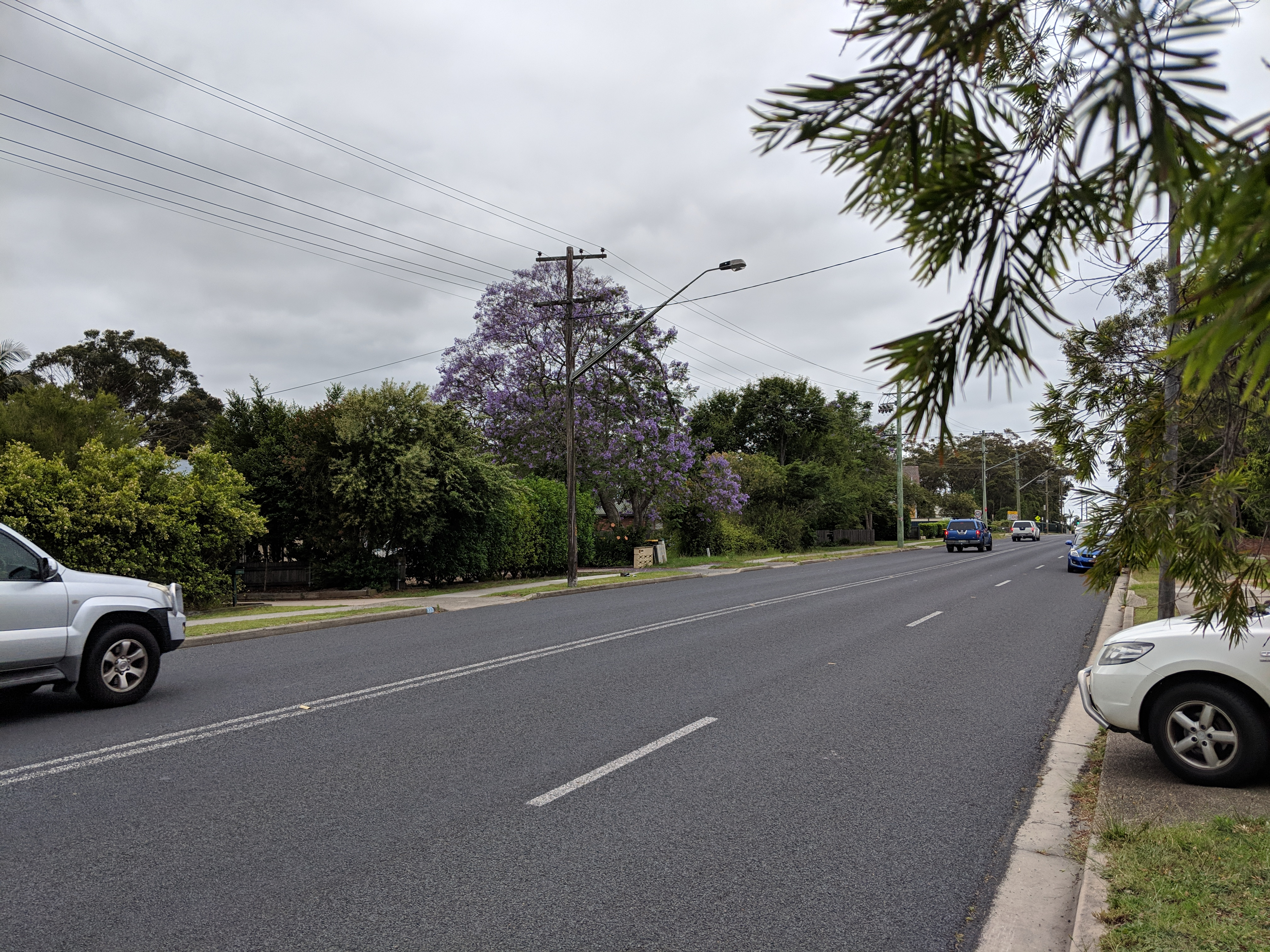

- Coordinates: 34°51′57″S 150°35′02″E
- Country: Australia
- State: New South Wales
- Region: South Coast
- LGA: City of Shoalhaven
- Location: 157 km (98 mi) S of Sydney CBD; 18 km (11 mi) SW of Berry; 5 km (3.1 mi) NW of Nowra

Government
  - State electorate: Kiama
  - Federal division: Gilmore
- Elevation: 53 m (174 ft)

Population
  - Total: 5,794 (2016 census)
- Postcode: 2541
- County: St Vincent
- Parish: Bunberra
Suburbs around North Nowra
Bangalee	Cambewarra	Meroo Meadow
Longreach	North Nowra	Bomaderry
Mundamia	Nowra	Terara

North Nowra is a suburb of Nowra in the City of Shoalhaven in New South Wales, Australia. It lies northwest of Nowra. At the 2016 census, it had a population of 5,794. There are four schools; a pre-school, a junior school, a special needs school and a stage school. Shoalhaven Zoo is found there on the north bank of the Shoalhaven River. Notable former residents include actress Christie Hayes.
