= Darkes Forest =

- Suburb
- Coordinates: 34°13′11″S 150°54′23″E
- Country: Australia
- State: New South Wales
- City: Wollongong
- LGAs: City of Wollongong; Wollondilly Shire

Government
  - State electorate: Heathcote
  - Federal division: Cunningham

Population
  - Total: 95 (2021 census)
- Postcode: 2508

Darkes Forest is a rural locality in the Wollongong and Wollondilly Shire local government areas. At the 2021 census, it had a population of 95. It is home to the Dharawal National Park and also features several farms. Darkes Glenbernie Orchard is the last remaining commercial orchard in Darkes Forest. Orchards were a feature of the area from 1890 when a French vigneron identified the area as being suitable for growing. The orchard grows predominantly apples and stone fruits. In recent years the farm has been value adding to its fresh product. Several products are made from its fresh produce and honey. The farm uses its fruit to make apple cider and apple cider vinegar. Darkes Cider won gold medals at the World Cider Awards 2017 & 2018. Darkes Brewing has also won accolades for its honey meads, including a carbonated mead. The orchard has become an iconic regional tourism attraction and many people visit to experience picking fruit from mid November till May each year. The farm uses a 50-seat tractor train to take visitors on interpretive tours through the 100 acre farm.
