= Tapitallee =

Rural locality in City of Shoalhaven

- Suburb
- Coordinates: 34.8276°S 150.5285°E
- Country: Australia
- State: New South Wales
- Region: South Coast
- LGA: City of Shoalhaven

Government
  - State electorate: Kiama
  - Federal division: Gilmore
- Elevation: 110 m (360 ft)

Population
  - Total: 625 (2016 census)
- Postcode: 2540
- County: St Vincent
- Parish: Bunberra

Tapitallee is a rural locality and northwestern suburb of Nowra. It is located approximately 100 km (62 mi) south of Sydney, near the Shoalhaven River.

Tapitallee is situated on the traditional land of the Dharawal people. The name, Dharawal, is a Yuin word for the cabbage-tree palm.

The Tapitallee Nature Reserve, a 95 ha (230 acres) nature reserve, created in January 2001, falls within the locality. It also adjoins the Bugong National Park.

The population of the locality was 625 at the 2021 census.
