= Princes Highway (disambiguation) =

The Princes Highway may refer to:

- Princes Highway, the Australian highway that joins Sydney to Adelaide, via Melbourne
  - Princes Freeway, the subsection of the road, between Traralgon in the east and Geelong in the west, via Melbourne
  - Princes Motorway, the subsection of the road, between the southern suburbs of Sydney and the southern perimeter of the Wollongong region
