= Memorial Drive, Wollongong =

Highway in Wollongong, New South Wales

Memorial Drive New South Wales
- Coordinates: 34.337088°S 150.911233°E (North end); 34.414443°S 150.881216°E (South end)

General information
- Type: Highway
- Length: 9.4 km (5.8 mi)
- Opened: 1963–1965 (North Wollongong–Gwynneville); 1985–1993 (Bellambi–North Wollongong); 2009 (Bulli–Bellambi)
- Gazetted: May 1986 (as Main Road 626); July 1993 (as State Highway 1)
- Route number(s): B65 (2009–present) (Bulli–North Wollongong)
- Former route number: State Route 60 (1993–2004) (Bellambi–North Wollongong); Freeway F8 (1973–1992) Entire route

Major junctions
- North end: Princes Highway; Bulli, Wollongong
- Princes Highway
- South end: Princes Motorway; Gwynneville, Wollongong

Highway system
- Highways in Australia; National Highway • Freeways in Australia; Highways in New South Wales

Memorial Drive is a highway in Wollongong, New South Wales. Originally built as a bypass of Wollongong, it has since been extended further north to act as a primary arterial route through the city's northern suburbs.

== Route ==
Memorial Drive starts at the intersection with Princes Highway in Bulli and heads in a southerly direction as a four-lane, dual-carriageway road, passing through the suburbs of Bellambi, Corrimal, and Towradgi, with a combination of separately-graded interchanges and at-grade intersections. It passes an interchange with the southern end of Princes Highway at North Wollongong, before eventually terminating at an interchange with Princes Motorway in West Wollongong.

== History ==
Traffic congestion through Wollongong's city centre kick-started the construction of a bypass northwest of it. Construction connecting Princes Highway at North Wollongong and West Wollongong through Gynneville commenced in May 1959, with one carriageway of the first stage opened to traffic in July 1963 as the Northern Distributor, later duplicated in 1965. A link road between Mount Ousley Road and the Northern Distributor, at an at-grade intersection at Gwynneville, was completed in March 1964 and later duplicated in the 1970s; this eventually became the first portion of the F6 Southern Freeway. An overpass taking University Avenue over the Distributor at Gwynneville was opened in September 1968, eliminating the previous at-grade intersection with Foley Street. No further attention was given to the Northern Distributor for some time; as the Department of Main Roads focussed more on extending the F6 Southern Freeway, to the point the western half of the Northern Distributor was subsumed into the F6 Southern Freeway when its southern extension from West Wollongong to Figtree opened in 1967; the southern terminus of the Northern Distributor was truncated to the intersection at Gwynneville as a result.

Preparations for a northern extension to the Northern Distributor began in the mid-1980s: the northern end where it intersected with Princes Highway at North Wollongong was converted to a grade-separated interchange in 1985, and the Elliots Road bridge at Fairy Meadow over the railway line (and the extension) opened to traffic in November 1989, allowing a section of the extension to reach Towradgi Road at an at-grade intersection in October 1990. Another section, a single carriageway between Towradgi Road and Bellambi Lane, opened to traffic in December 1992; this was later duplicated in May 1993. The intersection with the F6 Southern Freeway at Gynneville was reconstructed to a grade-separated interchange, beginning in April 1996 and opening in December 1998.

Another extension north, from Bulli to Bellambi, opened in 2009. Not long after its opening, the Northern Distributor was renamed Memorial Drive on 24 December 2010.

The passing of the Main Roads Act of 1924 through the Parliament of New South Wales provided for the declaration of Main Roads, roads partially funded by the State government through the Main Roads Board (later the Department of Main Roads, and eventually Transport for NSW). With the subsequent passing of the Main Roads (Amendment) Act of 1929 to provide for additional declarations of State Highways and Trunk Roads, the Department of Main Roads (having succeeded the MRB in 1932) proposed Main Road 626 from the intersection with Princes Highway in North Wollongong to the intersection with F6 Southern Freeway in Gwynneville on 9 May 1986; this was a unique case where the DMR proposed but never officially declared a road, despite the land being owned by the government (NSW's Ministry of Transport, in this case). When the extension to Bellambi opened in 1993, State Highway 1 was also altered to use the new route, from Bellambi to North Wollongong; this declaration was extended northwards to Bulli when the next extension there opened in 2009.

The passing of the Roads Act of 1993 through the Parliament of New South Wales updated road classifications and the way they could be declared within New South Wales. Under this act, Memorial Drive today retains its declaration as Highway 1, from the intersection with Princes Highway in Bulli via Bellambi and Towradgi to the intersection with Princes Highway at North Wollongong (and unofficially as Main Road 626 from North Wollongong to the interchange with Princes Motorway at West Wollongong).

Freeway Routes were introduced in 1973, and Freeway Route 8 (F8) was allocated to the Northern Distributor from North Wollongong to Gwynneville, but not signed as such when next extension north to Towradgi opened in 1990. When the second carriageway of the Towradgi to Bellambi section opened in 1993, State Route 60 replaced Freeway Route 8, with its re-alignment along Bellambi Lane and the Northern Distributor to its interchange with Princes Highway in North Wollongong; State Route 60 was eventually decommissioned in 2004. When the next extension north to Bulli opened and it was renamed in 2009, it was allocated route B65 (four years before the conversion to the newer alphanumeric system in 2013) from its new northern terminus at Bulli to the interchange with Princes Highway in North Wollongong, with the remaining portion to Gwynneville unallocated.

== Exits and interchanges ==
Memorial Drive is entirely contained within the City of Wollongong local government area.

Location	km	mi	Destinations	Notes
Bulli	0.0	0.0	Princes Highway (B65 north, unallocated south) – Thirroul, Waterfall, Wollongong	Northern terminus of road, route B65 continues north along Princes Highway
Woonona	0.8	0.50	Campbell Street – Woonona	Southbound entrance and northbound exit only
Woonona	1.3	0.81	Mitchell Road – Woonona; Thompson Street – Woonona	Northbound entrance from Mitchell Road only, southbound entrance and exit from Thompson Street only
Russell Vale	2.0	1.2	York Place	At-grade intersection
Russell Vale–Bellambi boundary	2.9	1.8	Bellambi Lane – Russell Vale, Bellambi	At-grade intersection
Corrimal	3.6	2.2	Rothery Street – Corrimal, Bellambi	At-grade intersection
Corrimal	4.3	2.7	Railway Street – Corrimal, East Corrimal	
Towradgi	5.5	3.4	Towradgi Road – Towradgi	At-grade intersection
Fairy Meadow–North Wollongong boundary	8.3	5.2	Princes Highway (B65 south, unallocated north) – Bulli, Wollongong, Dapto	Route B65 continues south along Princes Highway
North Wollongong–Gwynneville boundary	9.0	5.6	University Avenue (west) – Gwynneville; Porter Street (east) – Wollongong	Northbound entrance and southband exit only
Gwynneville	9.4	5.8	Princes Motorway (M1) – Heathcote, Silverwater, Sydney Olympic Park	Southern terminus of road Southbound entrance via University Avenue
Incomplete access; Route transition
