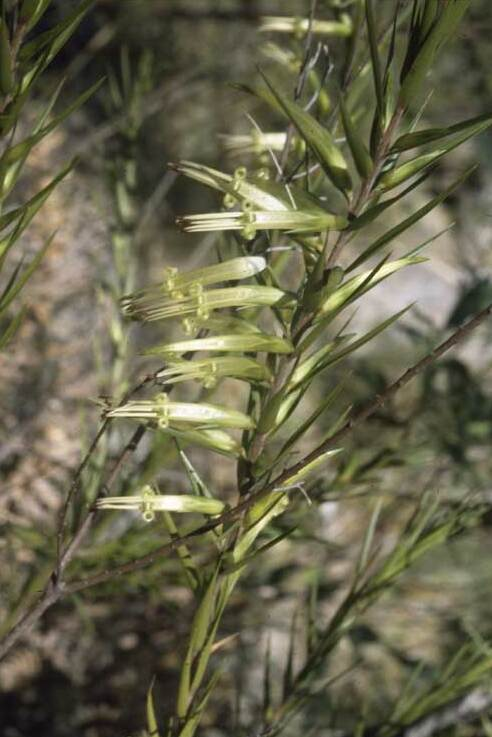

Scientific classification
- Kingdom: Plantae
- Clade: Tracheophytes
- Clade: Angiosperms
- Clade: Eudicots
- Clade: Asterids
- Order: Ericales
- Family: Ericaceae
- Genus: Styphelia
- Species: S. longifolia

Binomial name
- Styphelia longifolia R.Br.

= Styphelia longifolia =

Species of plant

Styphelia longifolia, commonly known as long-leaf styphelia, is a species of flowering plant in the heath family Ericaceae and is endemic to New South Wales. It is an erect shrub with more or less lance-shaped leaves and pale green or yellow flowers arranged singly in leaf axils.

== Description ==
Styphelia longifolia is an erect shrub that typically grows to a height of 0.6–2 m (2 ft 0 in – 6 ft 7 in), its branchlets covered with silky hairs. The leaves are more or less lance-shaped, 24–48 mm (0.94–1.89 in) long, 2.2–5.5 mm (0.087–0.217 in) wide on a petiole up to 1.5 mm (0.059 in) long, tapering gradually to a long, fine point. The flowers are arranged singly in leaf axils with glabrous bracteoles 4.5–6.5 mm (0.18–0.26 in) long. The flowers are pale green or yellow, the sepals 12–18 mm (0.47–0.71 in) long and the petals form a tube 20–25 mm (0.79–0.98 in) long with bearded lobes 15.0–15.7 mm (0.59–0.62 in) long. The stamen filaments are 8.0–12.4 mm (0.31–0.49 in) long. Flowering mainly occurs from May to July and the fruit is 7–8 mm (0.28–0.31 in) long.

== Taxonomy ==
Styphelia longifolia was first described in 1810 by Robert Brown in his Prodromus Florae Novae Hollandiae et Insulae Van Diemen. The specific epithet (longifolia) means "long-leaved".

== Distribution and habitat ==
This styphelia grows in open forest or woodland on sandy soil between Waterfall and Broken Bay.
