= Princes Highway =

Highway in Australia

Princes Highway New South Wales–South Australia

General information
- Type: Highway
- Length: 1,898 km (1,179 mi)
- Gazetted: November 1913 (VIC, as Main Road); July 1925 (VIC, as State Highway); August 1928 (NSW, as Main Road 1)
- History: Named in honour of Edward VIII (as the Prince of Wales)
- Route number(s): See Route allocation
- Former route number: See Former routes

Major junctions
- East end: Great Western Highway; Ultimo, Sydney
- East Motorway; Illawarra Highway; Kings Highway; Snowy Mountains Highway; Monaro Highway; Great Alpine Road; South Gippsland Highway; Strzelecki Highway; South Gippsland Freeway; EastLink; CityLink; Western Ring Road; Midland Highway; Hamilton Highway; Great Ocean Road; Hopkins Highway; Henty Highway; Glenelg Highway; Riddoch Highway; Southern Ports Highway; Dukes Highway
- West end: Glen Osmond Road; Glen Osmond, Adelaide

Location(s)
- Major settlements: Wollongong, Nowra, Ulladulla, Batemans Bay, Eden, Orbost, Sale, Traralgon, Melbourne, Geelong, Warrnambool, Mount Gambier, Kingston SE, Tailem Bend, Murray Bridge, Crafers

Highway system
- Highways in Australia; National Highway • Freeways in Australia; Highways in New South Wales; Highways in Victoria; Highways in South Australia

The Princes Highway is a major road in Australia, extending from Sydney to Adelaide via Melbourne, through the states of New South Wales, Victoria and South Australia. It is 1,941 kilometres (1,206 mi) long (along Highway 1) or 1,898 kilometres (1,179 mi) via the former alignments of the highway, although these routes are slower and connections to the bypassed sections of the original route are poor in many cases.

The highway follows the coastline for most of its length, and thus takes quite an indirect and lengthy route. For example, it is 1,040 kilometres (650 mi) from Sydney to Melbourne on Highway 1 as opposed to 870 kilometres (540 mi) on the more direct Hume Highway (National Highway 31), and 915 kilometres (569 mi) from Melbourne to Adelaide compared to 730 kilometres (450 mi) on the Western and Dukes Highways (National Highway 8). Because of the rural nature and lower traffic volumes over much of its length, the Princes Highway is a more scenic and leisurely route than the main highways between these major cities.

== Route ==
=== New South Wales ===
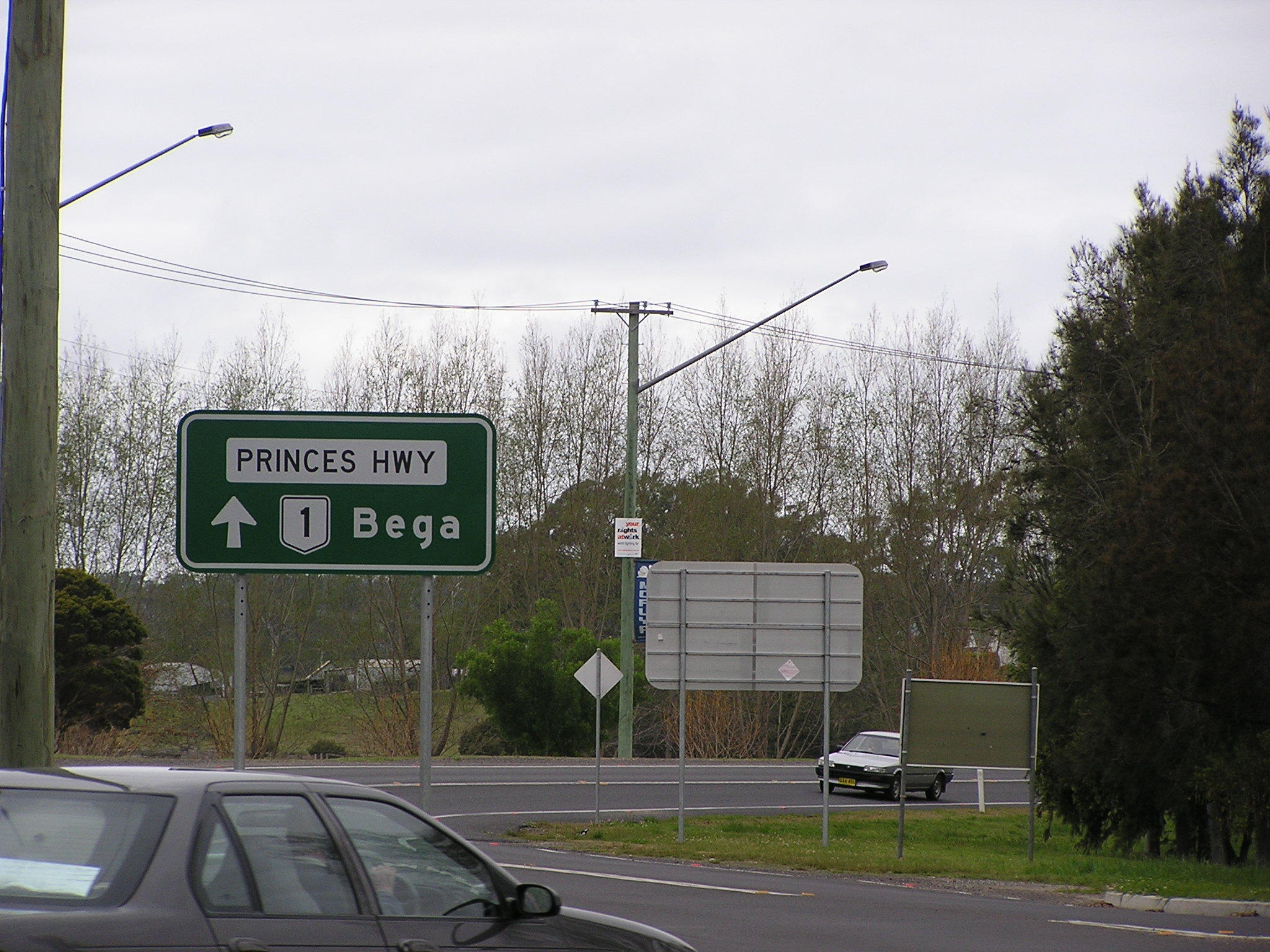
Princes Highway at Moruya.

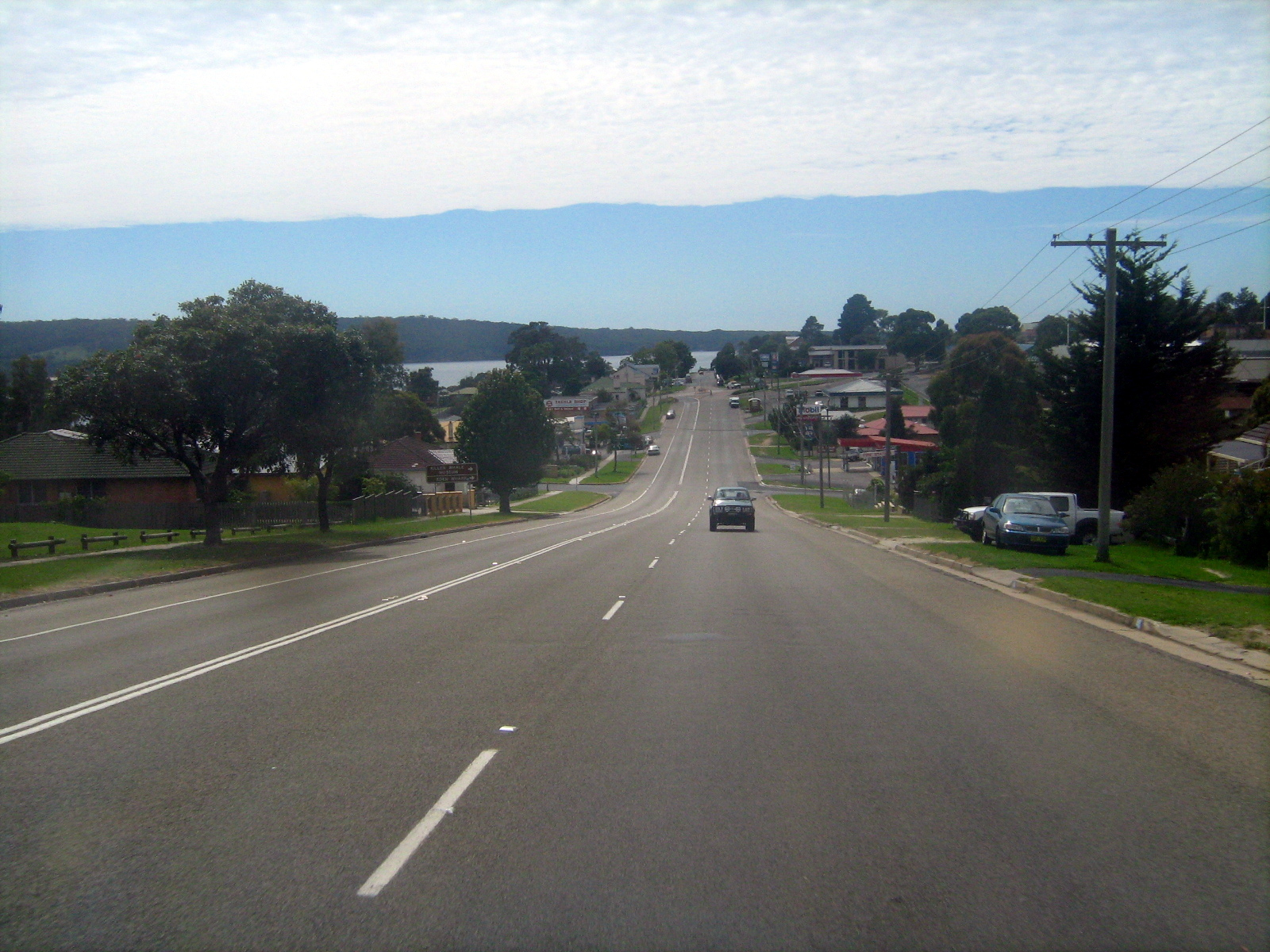
Princes Highway at Eden.

Princes Highway starts at the junction of Broadway (Great Western Highway) and City Road in the Sydney suburb of Chippendale. City Road in fact forms the first section of the highway, and becomes King Street, Newtown, also part of Princes Highway. Where King Street ends at Sydney Park Road, Princes Highway continues in its own right.

The highway in this section is constructed as a six-lane divided carriageway, other than along King Street (four-lane undivided) and along the western edge of the Royal National Park, where it is built as four-lane dual carriageway.

The only major engineering structures along its route are the twin Tom Uglys Bridge across Georges River. The northbound bridge is of steel truss construction, opened in 1929, whilst the southbound bridge is of prestressed concrete girders, opened in 1987.

It runs through Sydney's southern suburbs (the St George area and Sutherland Shire), via Kogarah, Sutherland and Engadine to the village of Waterfall.

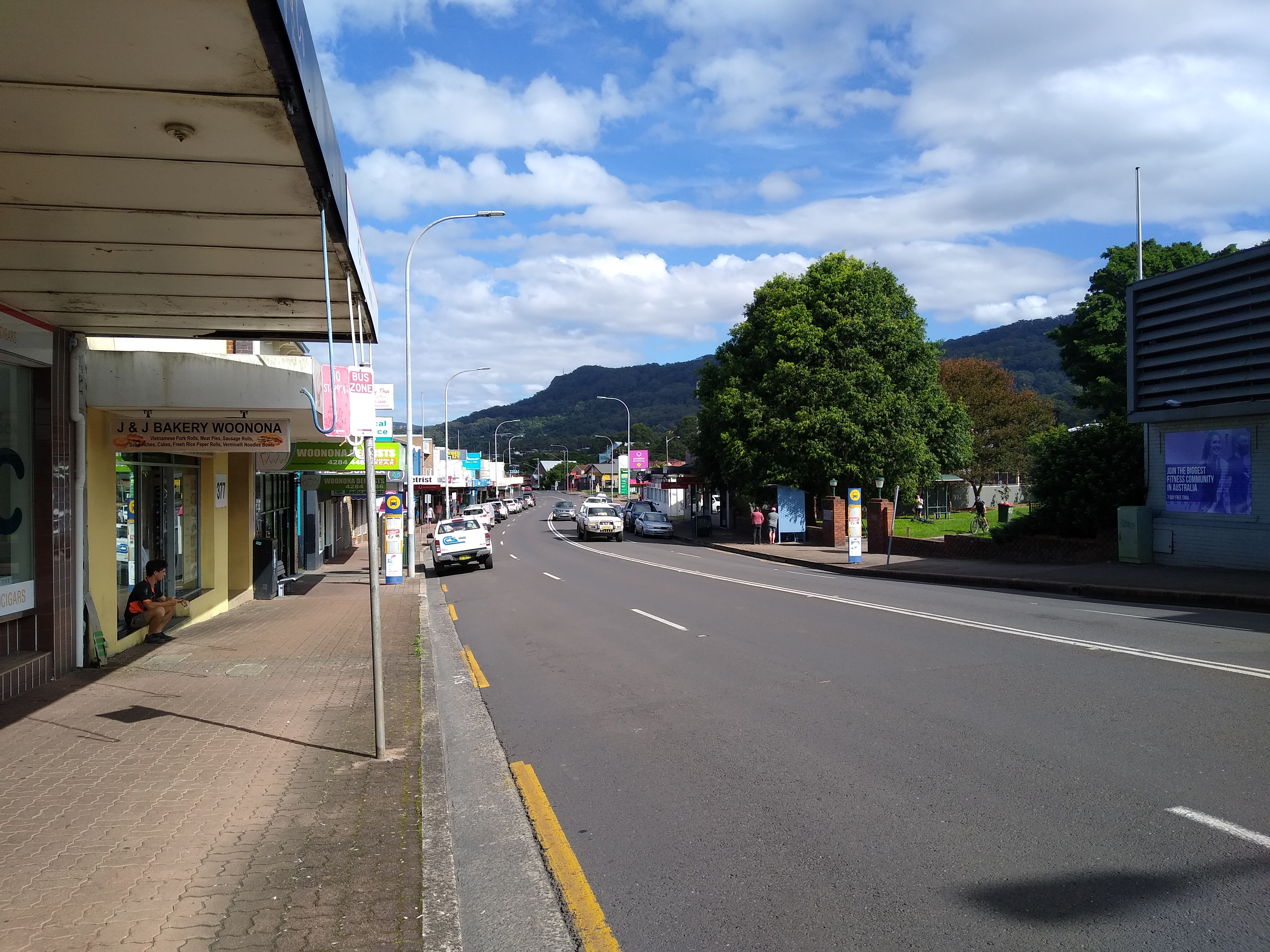
Princes Highway at Woonona

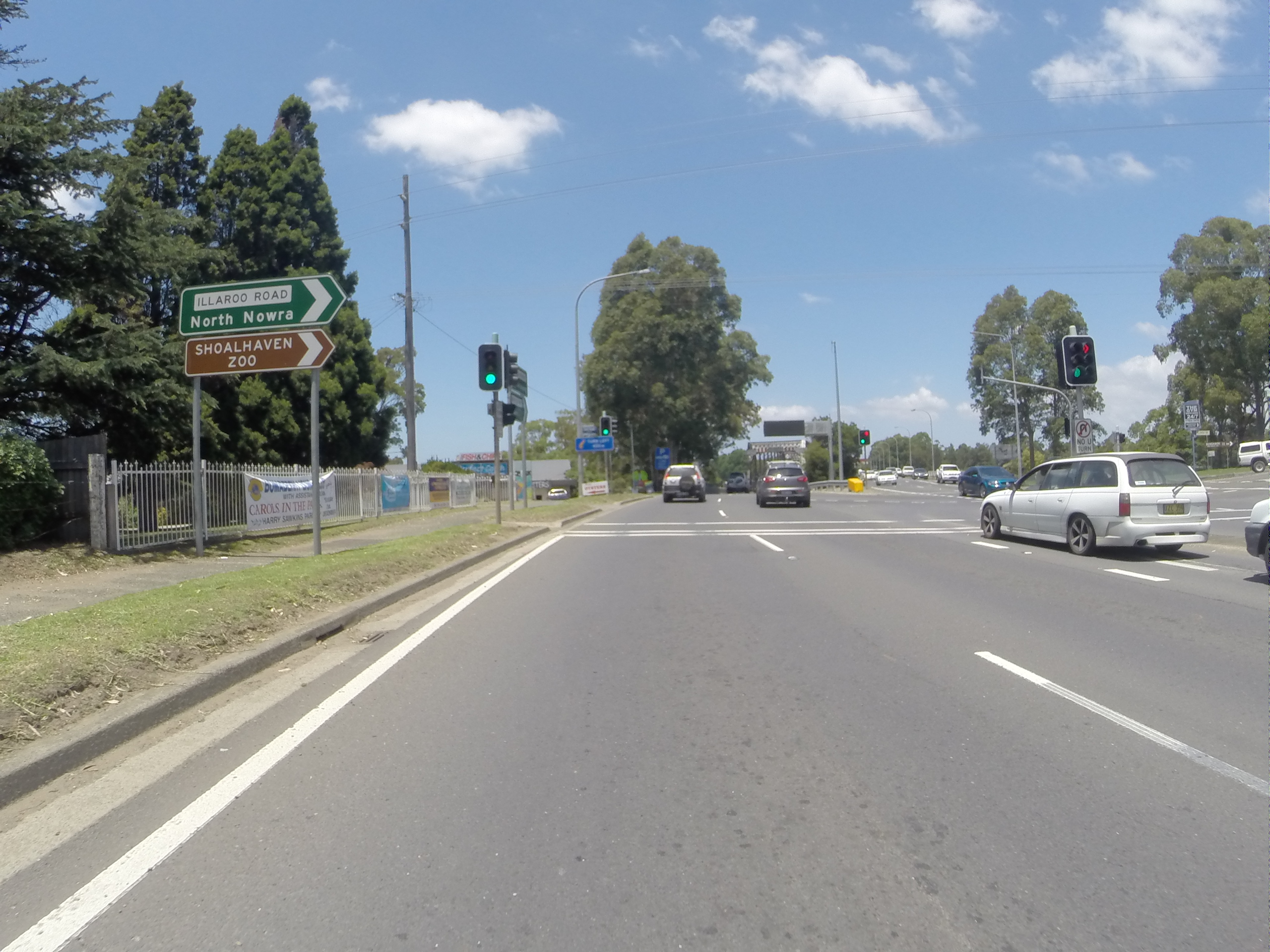
Princes Highway at Bomaderry

South of Waterfall the highway is paralleled by the 55-kilometre (34 mi) Princes Motorway (national route M1) to the top of Bulli Pass outside the city of Wollongong, which carries the majority of traffic. The Princes Highway then enters the northern suburbs of Wollongong and the Illawarra region via the Bulli Pass, whilst Mount Ousley Road, which is designated as part of national route 1, bypasses Wollongong's northern suburbs to meet the Princes Highway at Fairy Meadow, and carries inter-city traffic. Where Mount Ousley Road enters Wollongong, the Princes Motorway branches off Mount Ousley Road, and parallels the highway through the suburbs of Wollongong to Yallah.

The Mount Ousley Road-Princes Motorway route is the inter-city and main urban arterial through Wollongong's southern suburbs, whereas the Princes Highway acts as a local arterial.

From the interchange with the Princes Motorway at Yallah, the Princes Highway continues through the bypassed Albion Park Rail before reaching the southern terminus of the motorway at the Oak Flats interchange. From Oak Flats, the Princes Highway is dual carriageway, mostly of freeway standard, with the exception of the Kiama bends at Kiama Heights.

The highway then travels along the upgraded sections through Gerringong and Foxground before bypassing the town of Berry, where the highway follows larger gradients, compared to the flat terrain the Illawarra railway line follows immediately to the east.

Beyond Mullers Lane, Berry, the highway is a single two lane carriageway to Cambewarra Road, Bomaderry. Construction is underway for the duplication of the highway from Mullers Lane to Cambewarra Road and is expected to be completed in 2022.

From Cambewarra Road the highway is four lane divided through Bomaderry and Nowra to near the junction with Warra Warra Road in South Nowra. Duplication to dual carriageway standard of a 6-kilometre (4 mi) length south from here to Forest Road was scheduled for completion in early 2014, following a three-month cessation of work while measures were put in place to protect a hitherto unknown area of habitat of the endangered green and golden bell frog. Beyond this section is 4 kilometres (2.5 mi) of four lane single carriageway from Forest Road to the junction with Jervis Bay Road.

From Jervis Bay Road southward the highway is mostly single two lane carriageway along the NSW South Coast, passing through Ulladulla, Batemans Bay (where the 1-kilometre (0.6 mi) town centre bypass is built as dual carriageway), Moruya, Narooma, then bypassing Bega and Merimbula and passing through Eden, before crossing the border at the Black–Allan Line into Victoria, 550 kilometres (340 mi) from Sydney and 515 kilometres (320 mi) from Melbourne.

A substandard alignment at Victoria Creek 13 kilometres (8 mi) south of Narooma was upgraded in 2012–13, as well as the 3.5-kilometre (2.2 mi) Bega bypass. Realignments with associated new bridges are also proposed at Termeil Creek, some 30 kilometres (19 mi) south of Ulladulla, and Dignams Creek, some 20 kilometres (12 mi) south of Narooma. Current identified future projects are a bypass of Nowra-Bomaderry (definite route identified only for section south of Shoalhaven River), and a bypass of Ulladulla-Milton.

In 2007 the NRMA claimed Princes Highway was a dangerous road with ten fatalities and 729 people injured on the highway between Sydney and the state border in 2006.

=== Victoria ===
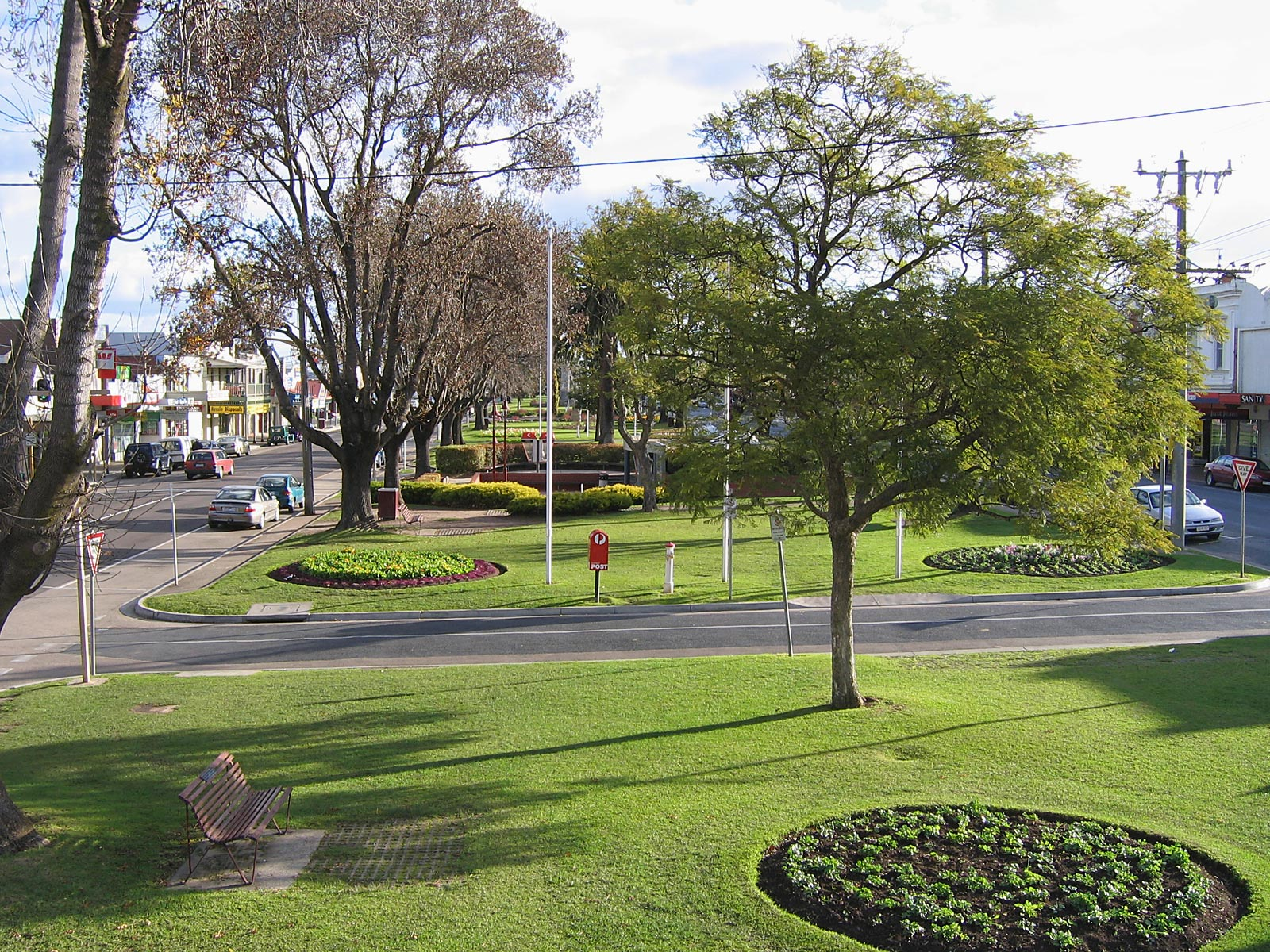
Princes Highway is picturesque in some towns, such as Gippsland's Bairnsdale, where the median strip has been made a garden.

In Victoria, Princes Highway follows a very long and complex route. The route within metropolitan Melbourne carries the original individual names of sections of Princes Highway on signage. Each road section has Princes Highway labelled in bold and the individual name in brackets, such as Dandenong Road or Geelong Road.

Apart from the routes Alt National Route 1, C101 and C109 (in the outer metropolitan areas – such as Berwick and Werribee), the M1 Freeway route intersects (Monash Freeway/CityLink/West Gate Freeway/Princes Freeway) and this carries the much higher volume of traffic, including congestion in the peak periods, serving as the major, most direct and quickest route for Route 1 in Australia.

In Victoria the length from the South Australian border to the New South Wales border is 955 kilometres (593 mi). The highway passes (from east to west) through Orbost, Bairnsdale and Sale in the Gippsland region. The highway then passes through the Latrobe Valley, bypassing Morwell, Warragul and Pakenham to Dandenong and into the south-eastern suburbs of Melbourne. Most of this section is freeway standard, with the main outstanding work being a freeway bypass of Traralgon, although the highway through Traralgon has already been built to urban dual carriageway standard.

Through much of Melbourne and its suburbs, the designation of National Route 1 is not along Princes Highway, but rather Monash Freeway, which intersects the Princes Highway on the eastern outskirts of Melbourne, then the southern link of the CityLink tollway, and then West Gate Freeway which bypasses central Melbourne. This avoids the confusing and congested arrangement of roads that is the Princes Highway in central Melbourne. The M1 include an advanced freeway management system for its entire 75-kilometre (47 mi) urban length, between Narre Warren and Werribee. Along with freeway sensors and associated data stations, overhead lane use management system (LUMS) gantries that show speed and lane availability, electronic message boards, real-time drive time signs and arterial road real-time Information signs (before the on-ramps); there are the 64+ ramp signal and metering sites. Hence, the majority of the on-ramps are traffic light controlled, depending on the density and speed of the traffic.

Heading towards Geelong in a south-west direction, the West Gate Freeway and Geelong Road join and become the Princes Freeway. Which, unusually for an Australian inter-city freeway, carries enough traffic to merit four to three lanes in either direction (often still being congested in the morning and afternoon peaks). On the northern outskirts of Geelong, the highway reverts from freeway to three lane dual carriageway through Geelong and its suburbs, with traffic light-controlled at-grade intersections. Through Geelong the highway is often heavily congested.

With the completion of the freeway standard Geelong Ring Road during 2008–09, the M1 route follows the freeway-standard road from Winchelsea to Traralgon, without encountering any traffic lights (with the exception of Yarragon and Trafalgar, which are yet to be bypassed). The ring road rejoins the original highway at Waurn Ponds on the western edge of Geelong.

Within Geelong, Princes Highway starts at the junction of Princes Freeway in the northern Geelong suburb of Corio, and runs through Geelong's northern and southern suburbs via an inner-city western bypass of the Geelong City Centre, to the current Highway 1 segment of the Princes Highway at Waurn Ponds in Geelong's southern suburbs. The highway is six lane dual carriageway from Corio to Latrobe Terrace, continuing as a four-lane dual carriageway to Waurn Ponds. The 1989 re-alignment of Princes Highway (along La Trobe Terrace) provides a dual carriageway, four-lane limited access road to replace the original route along Moorabool Street in South Geelong and High Street in Belmont. Upon the completion of the final section of the Geelong Ring Road, another section of the Princes Highway was superseded in 2013 at Waurn Ponds.

After Geelong the highway heads in a generally western direction, continuing with the 'M1' designation as a dual carriageway road to Winchelsea (opened 2015). West of Winchelsea, the road is presently being reconstructed to dual carriageway standard, passing through Colac, before reaching Camperdown – ultimately reaching the port of Warrnambool. The section from Geelong to Warrnambool runs inland, and so avoids the slower, but scenic Great Ocean Road. From here, Princes Highway passes through Portland before crossing the border into South Australia. At this point the highway is 1,530 kilometres (950 mi) from Sydney, 465 kilometres (289 mi) from Melbourne and 510 kilometres (320 mi) from Adelaide.

=== South Australia ===
At Mount Gambier the highway takes a more northward tack as the coast curves to the northwest, passing the Coorong National Park. After Kingston SE, it turns inland (north) to avoid the lakes at the mouth of the River Murray. Shortly before Tailem Bend it is joined by Dukes Highway, part of the main route between Melbourne and Adelaide. The highway then turns north-west and becomes South Eastern Freeway, crosses the Murray River, bypasses Murray Bridge and continues to Glen Osmond on Adelaide's southeastern outskirts.

At this point, Princes Highway is 6 kilometres (4 mi) from Adelaide and 2,055 kilometres (1,277 mi) from Sydney. It continues north-west via Glen Osmond Road to eventually terminate just south of the Adelaide city centre.

== Etymology ==
As a named route, the highway came into being when pre-existing roads were renamed as "Prince's Highway" after the planned visit to Australia by the Prince of Wales (later to become king Edward VIII and, after abdicating, the Duke of Windsor) in 1920. The original submissions in January 1920 were in order for the Prince to have the opportunity during his visit to make the trip from Melbourne to Sydney overland along the route. Different routes were considered, including the inland route via Yass. That idea never came to fruition, due partly to the limited amount of time and the cost of upgrading the road to a suitable standard for him to undertake the trip. The Prince did, however, give his permission for the naming.

== History ==
The section of Princes Highway between West Helensburgh and Bulli Tops was the original coastal route between Sydney and Wollongong, first used in 1843. From Bulli Tops this route continued south along today's Mount Ousley Road as far south as Mount Keira Road, and then followed Mount Keira Road around the west of Mount Keira. This route replaced the inland route from Sydney via Liverpool, Campbelltown, Appin to Bulli Tops.

The highway had opening ceremonies in both New South Wales and Victoria during 1920. The first section of road from Melbourne was opened on 10 August in Warragul. The road from Sydney was opened in Bulli on 19 October, by the NSW Minister for Local Government, Thomas Mutch.

Within Victoria, the passing of the Country Roads Act 1912 through the Parliament of Victoria provided for the establishment of the Country Roads Board (later VicRoads) and their ability to declare Main Roads, taking responsibility for the management, construction and care of the state's major roads from local municipalities. (Main) Gippsland Road was declared a Main Road over a period of months, from 10 November 1913 (Longwarry through Drouin to Warragul), 1 December 1913 (Mulgrave through Dandenong and Pakenham to Longwarry, and Warragul through Moe, Morwell and Traralgon to Rosedale), 2 February 1914 (Rosedale through Sale and Stratford to Bairnsdale), to 23 March 1914 (Prahran through Oakleigh and Mulgrave to Clayton); Orbost-Genoa Road from Orbost via Cann River to Genoa, and Swan Reach-Cunninghame Road from Bairnsdale via Swan Reach to Lakes Entrance, were declared Main Roads on 23 March 1914; and lastly, Genoa-Eden Road from Genoa to the interstate border with New South Wales and Eden beyond, was declared a Main Road on 7 September 1914; all were renamed in August 1920. {Melbourne-) Geelong Road was declared a Main Road from Footscray via Werribee and Little River to Corio on 30 December 1913; Geelong-Colac Road from Geelong to Waurn Ponds, Geelong-Warrnambool Road from Waurn Ponds via Colac and Terang to Warrnambool, Warrnambool-Port Fairy Road from Warrnambool to Port Fairy, were declared Main Roads on 16 March 1914, and Port Fairy-Portland Road from Port Fairy to Portland was declared a Main Road on 16 November 1914; before approval was given by the Victorian executive in January 1922 to extend Princes Highway west from Melbourne through Geelong, Camperdown, Warrnambool and Portland to the South Australian border, with the section of the road between Portland and the border declared a Main Road around the same time.

The passing of the Developmental Roads Act 1918 allowed the Country Road Board to declare Developmental Roads, serving to develop any area of land by providing access to a railway station for primary producers. Prince's Highway between Lakes Entrance and Orbost was declared a Developmental Road on 3 November 1920, the only section of the present alignment not already declared as a Main Road.

The passing of the Highways and Vehicles Act 1924 provided for the declaration of State Highways, roads two-thirds financed by the state government through the Country Roads Board. Prince's Highway was declared a State Highway on 1 July 1925, traversing the whole length of the state from its western boundary near Mount Gambier in South Australia, through Port Fairy, Warrnambool, Geelong to Melbourne, through Dandenong, Warragul, Sale, Bairnsdale and Orbost to the eastern boundary of the state towards Eden in New South Wales (for a total of 540 miles), subsuming the original declarations of (Main) Gippsland Road, Swan Reach-Cunninghame Road, Orbost-Genoa Road, Genoa-Eden Road, Melbourne-Geelong Road, Geelong-Colac Road, Geelong-Warrnambool Road, Warrnambool-Port Fairy Road and Port Fairy-Portland Road as Main Roads, and between Lakes Entrance and Orbost as a Developmental Road.

Within New South Wales, the passing of the Main Roads Act 1924 through the Parliament of New South Wales provided for the declaration of Main Roads, roads partially funded by the State government through the Main Roads Board (later Transport for NSW). Main Road No. 1 was declared along Prince's Highway on 8 August 1928, heading south from the City of Sydney through Sutherland, Wollongong, Nowra, Bateman's Bay and Eden to the southern boundary of the state towards Genoa in Victoria (for a total of 351.5 miles). With the passing of the Main Roads (Amendment) Act 1929 to provide for additional declarations of State Highways and Trunk Roads, this was amended to State Highway 1 on 8 April 1929. Before the adoption of the "Prince's Highway" name in 1920, the road between Sydney and the border was referred to as the Coast Road.

Within South Australia, roads from Adelaide to the South Australian border with Victoria were renamed by the state government in February 1922. At that time, the route from Adelaide was via Aldgate, Mylor, Macclesfield, Strathalbyn, and Langhorne Creek, crossing the Murray River at Wellington, then continuing along the present towns of Meningie, Kingston SE, Robe, Beachport, Millicent and Gambier Town (Mount Gambier). By 1928, the route went through Mount Barker and Wistow to Langhorne Creek. By 1935, the Princes Highway passed through Nairne and Kanmantoo, Murray Bridge and Tailem Bend (now known as the Old Princes Highway). That road was superseded by the South Eastern Freeway (Crafers-Murray Bridge in stages 1967–1979), Swanport Bridge (1979), finally extended from Crafers to Glen Osmond (2000). The section between Kingston SE and Millicent has also been replaced by a more direct inland route. The coastal route through Robe and Beachport is now route B101, the Southern Ports Highway.

In 1942, as part of wartime defence measures, a road was built from Mount Keira Road to Fairy Meadow. This route forms part of Mount Ousley Road.

The passing of the Roads Act of 1993 through the Parliament of New South Wales updated road classifications and the way they could be declared within New South Wales. Under this act, Princes Highway today retains its declaration as Highway 1, from the intersection with Broadway in Chippendale in Sydney, to the state border with Victoria.

The passing of the Road Management Act 2004 through the Parliament of Victoria granted the responsibility of overall management and development of Victoria's major arterial roads to VicRoads: VicRoads re-declared the road in 2010 as Princes Highway West (Arterial #6500), beginning at the state border with South Australia to Geelong, then from Altona North to Parkville; and in 2007 as Princes Highway East (Arterial #6510), beginning at the Melbourne CBD to Narre Warren, then from Yarragon to Trafalgar, then from Morwell to the state border with New South Wales.

In August 2011, the stretch of the highway in South Australia between Adelaide and Port Augusta (commonly referred to as "Highway 1") was renamed Port Wakefield Highway (between Adelaide and Port Wakefield) and Augusta Highway (between Port Wakefield and Port Augusta) as part of a process to standardise the rural property addressing system across the state.

=== Timeline of significant upgrades and bypasses ===
Timeline of significant upgrades and bypasses
Date	Project	State	Length		Value	Comments	Notes
Date	Project	State	km	mi	Value	Comments	Notes
1940	Laverton deviation	VIC	9.7	6		The construction of a deviation 6 miles in length (from Kororoit Creek Road, Altona to Old Geelong Road, Hoppers Crossing) was commenced on behalf of the Department of the Interior. The work includes the erection of a bridge over the railway near Laverton station; the new road opened to traffic some time after 30 June 1940.	
1961	Maltby By-pass Road (Werribee bypass)	VIC	10.5	6.5	A£950,000	Opened on 16 June 1961 by the Hon. Sir Thomas Maltby ED, MP, Minister of Public Works, the route was named the 'Maltby By-pass Road' by then Premier of Victoria, Henry Bolte MP. It was Victoria's first controlled-access highway, or 'freeway', as such roads are now generally known in Victoria. 'It is a 4-lane divided highway, 6.5 miles in route length, with no access from adjoining property or cross roads over its entire length'.	
1959–1962	Club Terrace Loop	VIC	16.50	10.25		Beginning in 1959, construction of the Club Terrace Loop deviation was completed in 1962, providing a completely new road diverting traffic from a 15-mile length of narrow, sub-standard road passing through the township of Club Terrace, west of Cann River	
1959–1963	North–South Motorway (Princes Motorway)	NSW				From North Wollongong to West Wollongong, the Motorway was opened in stages, replacing Princes Highway as main north–south route	
1964	Connector road	NSW				The road, from Mount Ousley Road to the North–South Motorway at Gwynneville, was opened to traffic.	
1967	Princes Highway East, near Mount Drummer	VIC	8.9	5.5		A ceremony, sponsored by Orbost Shire Council, at Genoa, was held on 17 January 1967.	
1967	South Eastern Freeway (Stage 1)	SA				Bypassed Crafers and Stirling.	
1969	Moe bypass	VIC	6.1	3.8		A dual-lane, 24 feet (7.3 m)-wide single carriageway has been constructed, with earthworks and grade separated structures to accommodate future duplicate pavements	
1972	Haunted Hills section	VIC	4.2	2.6		Second carriageway opened between Gunn's Gully and Hernes Oak.	
1973	Road duplication	VIC	6.4	4		Dual carriageway from East Warrnambool to Allansford.	
1974	Rail crossing elimination	VIC	1.1	0.7	$3.8 million	Reconstruction of bridges over railway and grade separation of connecting roads (Gordon Street), Footscray	
1975		NSW				Princes Highway from Waterfall to Bulli Tops, superseded by the opening of Southern Freeway.	
1976	Snowy River Bridge, Princes Freeway, Orbost	VIC	8.4	5.2	A$2.4 million	Opened by the Hon. J A Rafferty, Minister for Transport, 25 November 1976. The bridge was the first of four bridges to be built as part of the freeway bypass of Orbost. It's interesting to note the reference to a 'freeway', given that the entire bypass is a single two-lane carriageway and is not controlled access. The CRB's own definition of a freeway can be found in most of their annual reports dating back to the 1960s: 'A freeway is a road having dual carriageways with no direct access from adjoining properties and side roads. All crossings of a freeway are by means of overpass or underpass bridges, and traffic enters or leaves the freeway carriageways by means of carefully designed ramps'.	
1979	Swanport Bridge	SA				Completed the South Eastern Freeway to bypass Murray Bridge.	
1981	Drouin bypass	VIC	7	4.3	A$12 million	From Robin Hood to the 'existing' highway east of Drouin, with 'two lanes each direction, plus emergency stopping lanes'. Opened 12 February 1981, by the Hon. J C M Balfour, MP.	
1983	Berwick bypass	VIC	7.3	4.5	A$19.6 million	Opened on 14 December 1983 by the Federal Minister for Transport, the Hon. Peter Morris MP, and the Victorian Assistant Minister of Transport, the Hon. Jack Simpson MP. This road bypass was from the Princes Highway, near Hessle Road, to Pink Hill, Beaconsfield.	
1985	Warragul bypass	VIC	9	5.6	A$23 million	From the end of the Drouin Bypass to Nilma, opened on 12 December 1985 by the Federal Minister for Transport, the Hon. Peter Morris MP, and the Victorian Minister of Transport, the Hon. Tom Roper MP.	
1987	Road duplication	VIC	9	5.6	A$16 million	Nar Nar Goon to Garfield duplication opened 10 April 1987.	
1989	Road duplication	VIC				Garfield to Bunyip River duplication completed in June 1989.	
1992	Morwell bypass	VIC				Bypass opened to traffic in April 1992.	
1994	Longwarry section duplication	VIC	7.8	4.8	A$25 million	Duplication completed between Bunyip River and Robin Hood in January 1994.	
1995	Road duplication	VIC				Duplicated section between Trafalgar East to Moe opened in August 1995.	
1997	Road duplication	VIC	7	4.3		Yarragon to Trafalgar duplication opened to traffic on 2 May 1997, completing a dual carriageway highway from Melbourne to Traralgon.	
2000	Heysen Tunnels	SA				The tunnel replaced Mount Barker Road (through Eagle On The Hill), extending the Adelaide end of South Eastern Freeway from Crafers to Glen Osmond.	
2002	Oak Flats Interchange	NSW				The project was opened on 29 October 2001. The interchange was designed to significantly improve traffic flow around the Albion Park/Oak Flats section of the Princes Highway by removing a railway level crossing and nearby traffic signals. 'The interchange also connects with Shellharbour City Council's East-West Link Road'.	
2002	Geelong Road upgrade	VIC				Upgrades completed from the West Gate Bridge to Lara. The Hoppers Crossing to Corio section was widened from two lanes to three in each direction, improvements to interchanges and flood management were made, and central wire rope barriers were installed.	
2005	Kiama bypass	NSW			A$179 million	Opened to traffic on 28 November 2005. The North Kiama Bypass linked the Kiama Bypass in the south and the Princes Highway near Dunmore in the north.	
2007	Pakenham bypass	VIC	20	12	A$242 million	Opened to traffic in December 2007, funded jointly by the state and federal governments.	
2008	Geelong Ring Road	VIC				Corio to Hamilton Highway, Fyansford opened 14 December 2008.	
2009	Geelong Ring Road	VIC			A$380 million	Hamilton Highway, Fyansford to Waurn Ponds opened 14 June 2009, six months ahead of schedule. The project from Corio to Waurn Ponds was funded jointly by the state and federal governments.	
2009	Road duplication	NSW			A$108 million	Oak Flats to Dunmore dual carriageways opened to traffic in October 2009, completing a four-lane route between Sydney and south of Kiama.	
2013	Geelong Ring Road	VIC				Anglesea Road to Princes Highway opened to traffic in February 2013.	
2013	Road duplication	VIC	4	2.5		Wurruk to Sale duplication opened June 2013.	
2015	Road duplication	VIC	30	19		From Waurn Ponds to Winchelsea.	
2019–2021	Albion Park Rail Bypass	NSW	9.8	6.1	A$630 million	The northbound lanes of the Albion Park Rail Bypass opened on 7 August 2021. The southbound lanes of the Albion Park Rail Bypass opened on 9 October 2021, completing the 'missing link' in the high standard road between Heathcote and Bomaderry.	
2010–2024	Road duplication	VIC	43	26.71		From Traralgon to Sale.	

==== Projects ====
List of projects on the Princes Highway in New South Wales
Project	Length		Construction		Value	Status	Notes
Project	km	mi	Start	Complete	Value	Status	Notes
Bulli Pass upgrade	1.1	0.68				In progress	
Albion Park Rail bypass	9.8	6.1	November 2018	October 2021	$630 million	Complete	
Oak Flats to Dunmore upgrade			June 2007	October 2009	$108 million	Complete	
North Kiama bypass	7.6	4.7	November 2003	October 2005	$141 million	Complete	
Kiama On and Off Ramps (Northbound and Southbound)				2008/2009	$8 million	Complete	
Gerringong upgrade	7.5	4.7	July 2012	August 2015	$340 million	Complete	
Foxground and Berry bypass	11.6	7.2	January 2015	June 2017	$580 million	Complete	
Berry to Bomaderry upgrade	11.5	7.1	September 2018	2022 (estimated)	$450 million	In progress	
Nowra Bridge study (southbound)						In planning	
South Nowra upgrade – Kingorne Street to Forest Road	6.3	3.9	November 2011	March 2014	$62 million	Complete	
Forest Road to Jervis Bay Road	23.5	14.6		December 2008	$23.5 million	Complete	
Conjola Mountain realignment	2.3	1.4	September 2008	April 2010	$58 million	Complete	
Burrill Lake Bridge replacement				Early 2018	$58 million	Complete	
Termeil Creek realignment	1.6	0.99	February 2015	Mid 2016	$21 million	Complete	
Nangudga Bridge replacement				December 2011	$3.7 million	Complete	
Victoria Creek upgrade	3.2	2.0	June 2011	March 2013	$35 million	Complete	
Dignams Creek upgrade	2.0	1.2	Early 2017	April 2019	$45 million	Complete	
Bega bypass	3.6	2.2	June 2012	December 2013	$55 million	Complete	
Pambula River Bridge replacement	3.5	2.2	August 2006	March 2008	$17 million	Complete	

=== Route allocation ===
Princes Highway was signed National Route 1 across its entire length in 1955. The Whitlam government introduced the federal National Roads Act 1974, where roads declared as a National Highway were still the responsibility of the states for road construction and maintenance, but were fully compensated by the Federal government for money spent on approved projects. As an important interstate link between the capitals of South Australia and Victoria, the parts of Princes Highway not already replaced by South Eastern Freeway between Adelaide and Tailem Bend were declared a National Highway in 1974. With all three states' conversion to their newer alphanumeric systems between the late 1990s to the early 2010s, its former route number for the most part was updated to A1 for the highway within Victoria (in 1997), South Australia (in 1998), and eventually the New South Wales section (in 2013), but with many exceptions: see below.

Due to its history of bypasses, many sections of Princes Highway today have different route allocations. These allocations, from its northern terminus in Sydney to its western terminus in Adelaide, are:

Route allocations on the Princes Highway
Route allocation	Road name(s)	Start point	End point	Distance		Cumulative distance		Notes
Route allocation	Road name(s)	Start point	End point	km	mi	km	mi	Notes
A36	City Road; King Street; Princes Highway	Broadway	Junction with President Avenue, Kogarah	11.3	7.0	11.3	7.0	
A1	Princes Highway	Junction with President Avenue, Kogarah	South of Waterfall, with exit as the Princes Highway to Helensburgh	27.8	17.3	39.1	24.3	
undesignated	Princes Highway (superseded route)	South of Waterfall	Maddens Plains	20.9	13.0	60.0	37.3	
B65	Princes Highway (superseded route)	Junction with Lawrence Hargrave Drive, Thirroul	Junction with Memorial Drive, Bulli	2.9	1.8	62.9	39.1	
undesignated	Princes Highway (superseded route)	Junction with Memorial Drive, Bulli	Oak Flats Interchange	34.5	21.4	97.4	60.5	
M1	Princes Motorway	South of Waterfall	Oak Flats Interchange	62.3	38.7	101.4	63.0	
A1	Princes Highway	Oak Flats Interchange	Black–Allan Line; NSW/Victorian border	415	258	516.4	320.9	
A1	Princes Highway	Victorian/NSW border	Traralgon					
M1	Princes Freeway *	Traralgon	Narre Warren					
C101	Princes Highway (superseded route, Pakenham)	Nar Nar Goon	Narre Warren with 'brief old-freeway', link highway at Beaconsfield					
Alternate National Route 1	Princes Highway	Narre Warren	Southbank (at West Gate Freeway east terminus)					
Metro Route 60	Kings Way; King Street	Southbank	West Melbourne (Victoria Street)					
Metro Route 60	Curzon Street; Harker Street	West Melbourne	Parkville (near North Melbourne)					
Metro Route 60	Flemington Road	Parkville (near North Melbourne)	Parkville (near CityLink (west))					
Metro Route 83	Geelong Road (Princes Highway)	Parkville	Laverton North					
M1	Princes Freeway (Maltby Bypass Geelong Ring Road) *	Laverton North	Geelong (Mount Moriac)					
C109	Princes Highway (superseded route, Werribee)	Werribee (near Point Cook and Hoppers Crossing) near Old Geelong Road	Werribee (near Cocoroc)					
A10	Princes Highway (superseded route, Geelong); Latrobe Terrace; Settlement Road; Colac Road	Corio (near Avalon)	Waurn Ponds (near Town centre, former West alignment now Waurn Ponds Drive but closed at freeway far-west terminus)					
M1	Princes Highway	Geelong (Mount Moriac)	Colac (Colac East)					
A1	Princes Highway	Colac (Colac East)	Victorian/South Australian border					
A1	Princes Highway	South Australian/Victorian border	Mount Gambier					
B1	Princes Highway	Mount Gambier	Tailem Bend					
B101 (former alt route)	Southern Ports Highway	Millicent	Kingston SE					
A1	Princes Highway	Tailem Bend	Murray Bridge					
M1	South Eastern Freeway/Princes Highway	Murray Bridge	Glen Osmond					
B55 (borrowed) (White Hill – Murray Bridge East) undesignated (Murray Bridge East – Long Flat)	Adelaide Road/Bridge Street/Old Princes Highway (Karoonda Highway); Old Princes Highway (Murray Bridge)	Long Flat	White Hill					
undesignated	Old Princes Highway (Nairne, Kanmantoo, Callington (north), Monarto)	White Hill	Littlehampton; Mount Barker					

*The gap between the two stages of Princes Freeway are taken up by either a series of unrelatedly named motorways (Monash Freeway, CityLink and West Gate Freeway) or largely by Princes Highway.

==== Former routes ====
Within New South Wales, Princes Highway formerly entered Wollongong as State Route 60 down the Bulli Pass and ran a largely separate route from Bulli and Thirroul through to the southern suburbs from the parallel Princes Motorway, the latter of which today is designated part of route M1. The gazetted route of Princes Highway today differs from the route of State Route 60 (and from that shown on road signs). The gazetted route was designated State Route 60 (now part of route B65, Memorial Drive) for its length, but deviated from the road that is signposted as Princes Highway between Bellambi and North Wollongong.

== Major intersections ==
=== New South Wales ===
Location	km	mi	Destinations	Notes
Dapto			Princes Motorway – Wollongong, Sydney	
Shellharbour			Shellharbour Road – Shell Cove, Shellharbour Village, Killalea Regional Park	
Bomaderry			Moss Vale Rd	
Batemans Bay			Kings Highway – Braidwood, Canberra	
Bega			Snowy Mountains Highway – Cooma, Canberra	
		New South Wales – Victoria state border		

=== Victoria ===
==== NSW Border – Morwell ====
Location	km	mi	Destinations	Notes
Genoa			Mallacoota–Genoa Road – Mallacoota	
Cann River			Monaro Highway (B23) – Canberra	
Club Terrace			Combienbar Road	
Orbost			Cabbage Tree–Road	
Orbost			Lochiel Street	
Nowa Nowa			Bruthen–Nowa Nowa Road	
Swan Reach			Metung Road	
Swan Reach			Swan Reach Road	
Lucknow			Great Alpine Road	
Bairnsdale			Paynesville Road	
Bairnsdale			Service Street	
Bairnsdale			Bairnsdale–Dargo Road	
Bairnsdale			Bengworden Road	
Lindenow South			Lindenow South Road	
Stratford			Stratford–Bengworden Road	
Stratford			Briagolong Road	
Stratford			Stratford–Maffra Road	
Myrtlebank			Bengworden Road	
Sale			Maffra–Sale Road	
Sale			Raglan Street	
Sale			South Gippsland Highway	
Sale			Sale–Heyfield Road	
Rosedale			Maffra–Rosedale Road	
Rosedale			Rosedale–Heyfield Road	
Rosedale			Lyons Street	
Traralgon			Princes Freeway (M1) – Melbourne	Continues west as the Princes Freeway

==== Geelong – SA Border ====
Location	km	mi	Destinations	Notes
Geelong			Geelong Ring Road (M1) – Melbourne	Continues east as the Geelong Ring Road
Mount Moriac			Cape Otway Road (C135 south) – Ceres, Bannockburn Devon Road (C111 north) – Moriac, Torquay	
Winchelsea			Inverleigh–Winchelsea Road (C145) – Inverleigh	
Winchelsea			Winchelsea–Deans Marsh Road (C151) – Lorne	
Birregurra			Birregurra Road (C119) – Birregurra	
Warncoort			Warncoort–Birregurra Road (C152) – Birregurra, Lorne, Apollo Bay	
Colac East			Colac–Ballarat Road (C146) – Ballarat	
Colac			Queen Street (C154) – Apollo Bay	
Colac			Corangamite Street (C155) – Lavers Hill	
Colac West			Corangamite Lake Road (C147) – Beeac, Ballarat	
Pirron Yallock			Timboon–Colac Road (C163) – Simpson, Timboon	
Stonyford			Cobden–Stonyford Road (C149) – Cobden	
Camperdown			Camperdown–Cobden Road (C164); Cobden, Timboon, Port Campbell Camperdown–Lismore Road (C164/C165) – Lismore, Beaufort, Ballarat	
Gnotuk			Darlington–Camperdown Road (C173) – Darlington	
Noorat East			Mackinnons Bridge Road (C158)	
Terang			Terang–Mortlake Road (C156) – Mortlake, Ararat, Hamilton	
Terang			Cobden–Terang Road (C156) – Cobden	
Terang			Ayresford Road (C168) – Peterborough, Timboon	
Allansford			Great Ocean Road (B100) – Peterborough, Port Campbell, Apollo Bay, Torquay	
Warrnambool			Hopkins Highway (B120) – Mortlake, Ararat	
Warrnambool			Caramut Road (C174) – Caramut	
Illowa			Southern Cross Road (C177) – Koroit, Hamilton	
Killarney			Koroit–Port Fairy Road (C179) – Koroit	
Killarney			Penshurst–Port Fairy Road (C178) – Penshurst, Dunkeld, Stawell	
Port Fairy			Hamilton–Port Fairy Road (C184) – Hamilton	
Tyrendarra			Tyrendarra–Ettrick Road (C191) – Condah, Coleraine	
Bolwarra			Henty Highway (A200 south) – Portland	
Heywood			Woolsthorpe–Heywood Road (C176) – Woolsthorpe	
Heywood			Henty Highway (A200 north) – Hamilton, Horsham, Warracknabeal, Mildura	
Drumborg			Portland–Casterton Road (C195) – Casterton	
Dartmoor			Dartmoor–Hamilton Road (C187) – Hamilton	
		South Australia – Victoria state border		

=== South Australia (VIC Border – Adelaide) ===
Location	km	mi	Destinations	Notes
		Princes Highway (A1) – Adelaide		

== See also ==
- Highway 1 (Australia)
- Highway 1 (South Australia)
- Highways in Australia
- Highways in Victoria
- List of highways in New South Wales
- List of highways in South Australia
- Princes Freeway
