= Killalea =

Park in New South Wales, Australia

Coordinates: 34°35′55″S 150°52′04″E

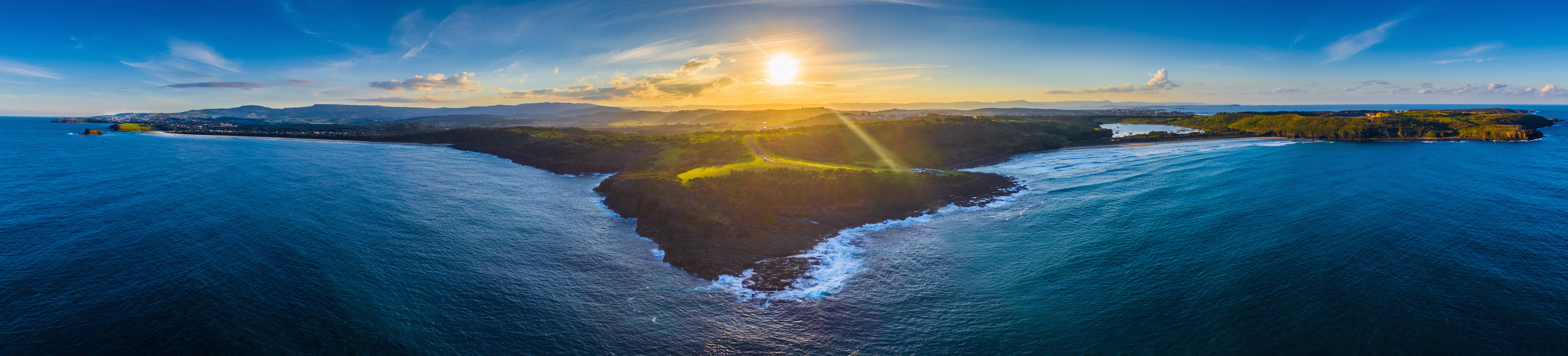
panorama of Killalea State Park

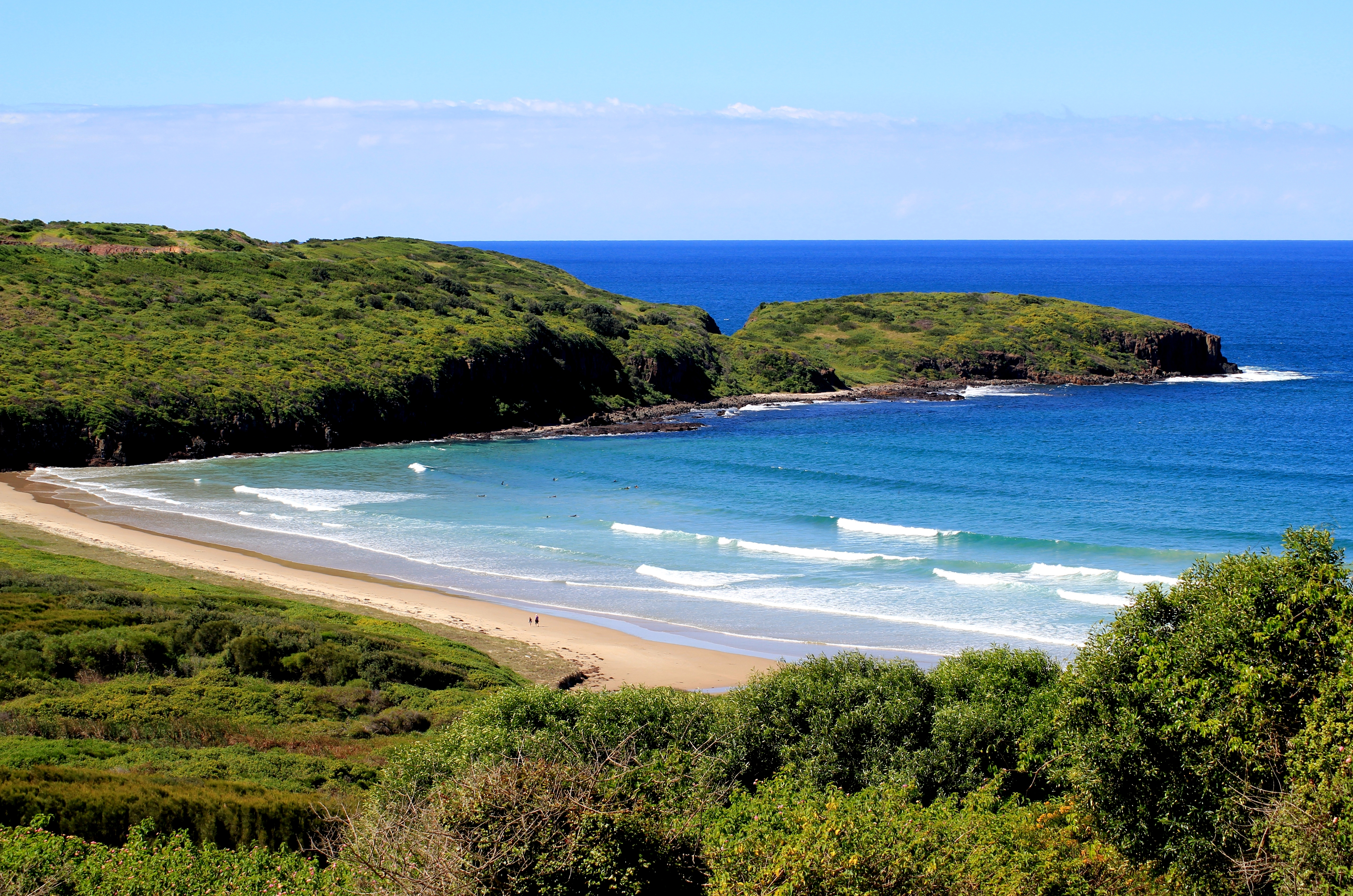
Killalea State Park in 2012

Killalea Regional Park is a national park in New South Wales, Australia. It is managed by National Parks and Wildlife Services.

== History and Facilities ==
The park has camping and beach facilities. Entry is free. In June 2011, the Killalea State Park Trust, which manages the park, proposed instating an entry fee to allow the park to expand and improve its services.

In 2009, the Killalea Reserve was declared a national surfing reserve with a vision to preserve this unique surfing break for future generations.
