= Princes Motorway =

Motorway in New South Wales, Australia

Princes Motorway F6 Freeway, Southern Freeway New South Wales
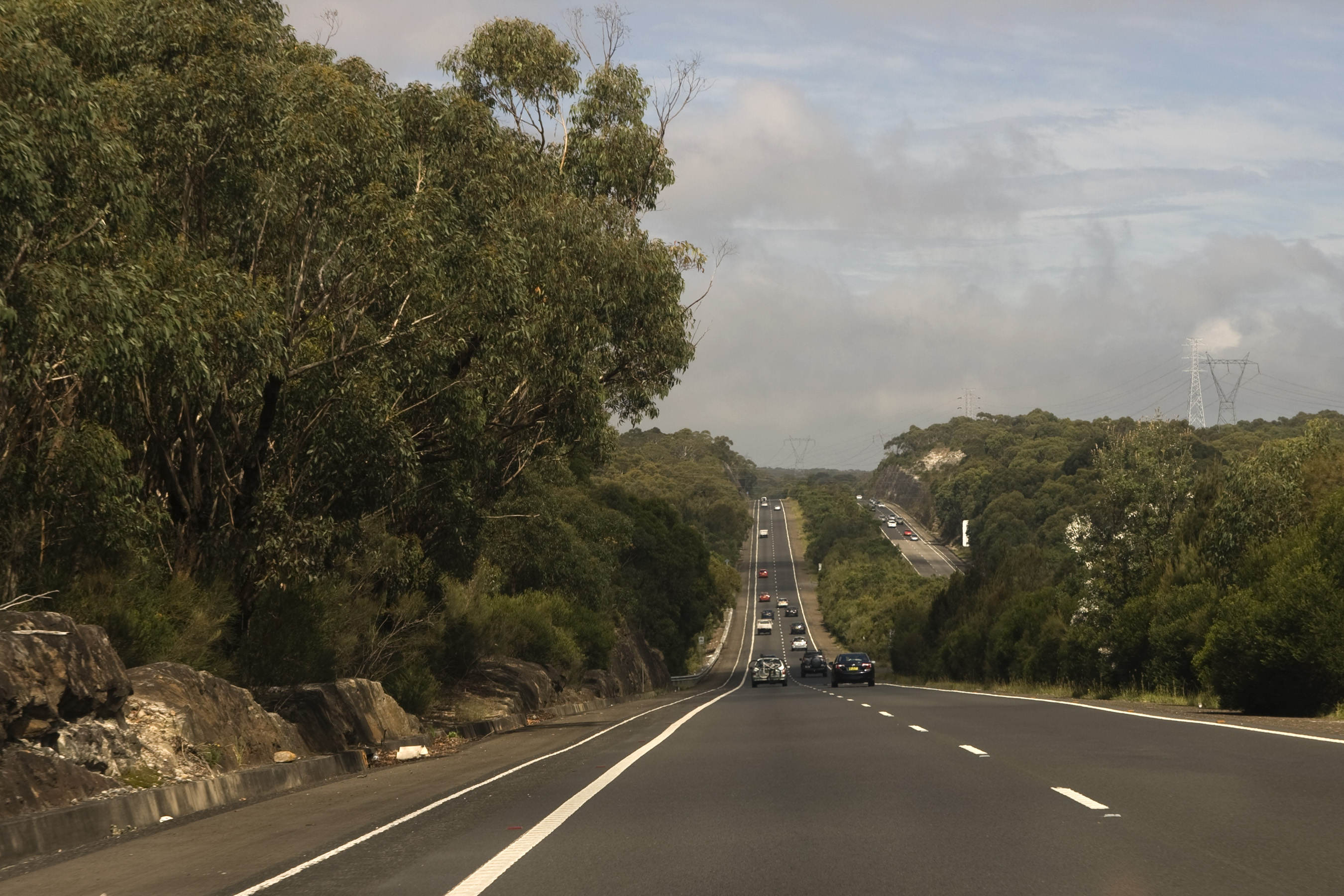
- Princes Motorway near Helensburgh
- Coordinates: 34.142724°S 150.993731°E (North end); 34.574156°S 150.823366°E (South end)

General information
- Type: Motorway
- Length: 62.0 km (39 mi)
- Opened: 1963–1989 (Southern section); 1975 (Northern section)
- Gazetted: October 1975
- Route number(s): M1 (2013–present)
- Former route number: National Route 1 (Mount Ousley Road section, 1975–mid 1980s; entire route, mid 1980s–2013); Freeway Route F6 (Waterfall–Bulli Tops and Gwynneville–Yallah sections, 1975–mid 1980s)

Major junctions
- North end: Princes Highway; Waterfall, Sydney
- Appin Road; Picton Road; Princes Highway; Memorial Drive; Illawarra Highway
- South end: Princes Highway; Oak Flats, New South Wales

Location(s)
- Region: Greater Sydney; Illawarra
- Major suburbs / towns: Helensburgh, Wollongong, Figtree, Dapto

Highway system
- Highways in Australia; National Highway • Freeways in Australia; Highways in New South Wales

Princes Motorway is a 62-kilometre (39 mi) predominantly dual carriage untolled motorway that links Sydney to Wollongong and further south through the Illawarra region to Oak Flats. Part of the Australian Highway 1 network, the motorway is designated route M1.

The motorway is sometimes known by its previous signposting F6 (Freeway Route 6) and its previous name Southern Freeway, which applied to the sections between Waterfall and Bulli Tops as well as Gwynneville and Yallah. The section between Bulli Tops and Gwynneville was known as Mount Ousley Road, and was first built as a defence route and later upgraded to dual carriageway standards.

It is the backbone of road traffic in the Illawarra. As Wollongong and Port Kembla are important industrial centres, freight traffic is heavy. Despite the current decline of the local steel industry, emergence of Wollongong as a commuter city of Sydney has kept the motorway busy.

== Route ==
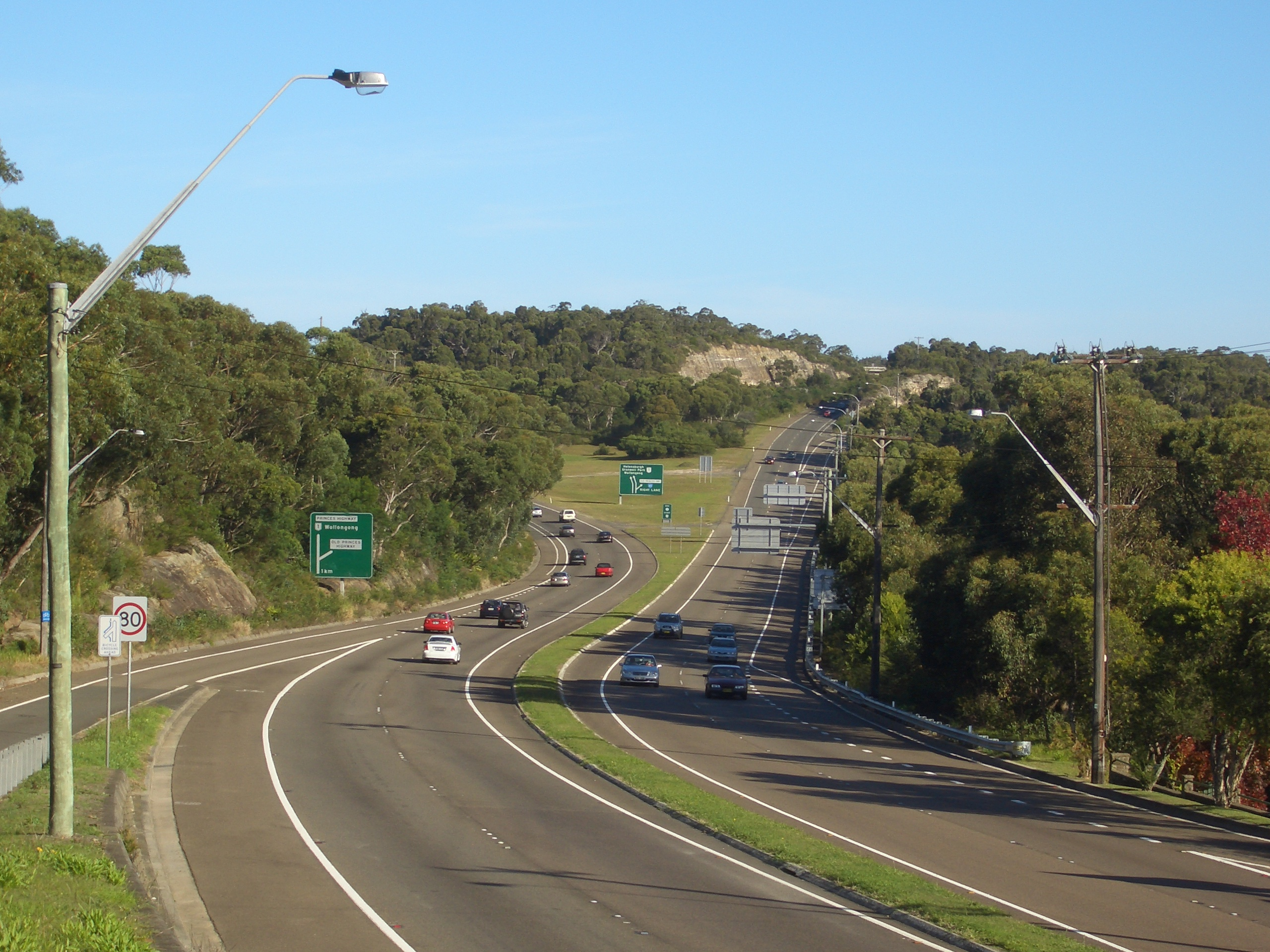
The northern terminus of Princes Motorway, looking south from Waterfall, pictured in 2007.

In the north, Princes Motorway commences at the interchange with Princes Highway at Waterfall in Sydney and heads south as a four-lane, dual-carriageway road, taking more or less a parallel route with Princes Highway until the sprawling interchange with Appin Road and Princes Highway at Bulli Tops. It continues downhill, avoiding the steep Bulli Pass, and bypasses Wollongong CBD, through Gwynneville and continues for 30 kilometres (19 mi), bypassing the suburbs of Yallah and Albion Park Rail, reaching the interchange with Illawarra Highway (Terry Street) at Albion Park, before terminating with the existing alignment of Princes Highway at an interchange in Oak Flats.

== History ==
The motorway can be divided into four sections, from north to south:

- Northern section, between Waterfall and Bulli Tops (formerly Southern Freeway)
- Central section, between Bulli Tops and Gwynneville (also known as Mount Ousley Road)
- Southern section, between Gwynneville to Yallah (formerly Southern Freeway)
- Albion Park Rail Bypass

=== Northern section (Waterfall to Bulli Tops) ===
Construction of the section between Waterfall and Bulli Tops commenced in July 1970. At 22.9km, it was then the longest section of freeway to completed at one time, at a cost of $30.5 million; it opened as Southern Freeway on 24 July 1975, and was allocated Freeway Route F6 (which later allowed it to be locally known as the "F6 Freeway"). Financed by State Government bonds, this section of freeway initially incurred a toll from its opening. This part of the freeway did not feature the Helensburgh Interchange (which subsequently opened in February 2000). The toll operated for 20 years: this was 10 years short of its intended operating length, due to local residents complaining that the F3 Freeway had its toll dropped in 1988 (which was at the time intended to be dropped as its loans had been fully paid off, unlike those of the F6). After much pressure, the tolls were eventually removed on 30 July 1995, when the loans had been repaid. Remnants of the tollbooths could initially be seen at the old toll plaza at Waterfall, such as faint markings and a set of warning lights in the southbound direction for the toll plaza. These remnants have since been removed. However, as of 2021, the widened carriageways for the toll booths can still be seen at 34.150476°S 150.990208°E.

To complement the tollway, the dual carriageways of Princes Highway from Waterfall north to Loftus and the Sutherland bypass were constructed and opened to traffic on 16 September 1975.

=== Central section (Mount Ousley Road) ===
The section between Bulli Tops and Gwynneville was previously named as part of Mount Ousley Road, and is still often referred to as such. Mount Ousley Road was built in 1942 as a defence route, involving the reconstruction of part of a 19th century route from Bulli Tops to the Picton-Mt Keira road (the southern section not incorporated into the defence route is Clive Bissell Drive), and the construction of a new section of road to descend the escarpment and terminate at Princes Highway at North Wollongong (the easternmost 3.5 km of Picton Road, from Mount Keira Road to Mount Ousley Road, was also constructed as part of this project).

From the 1960s to the 1980s Mount Ousley Road was gradually upgraded, initially by the construction of overtaking lanes, then the staged extension of the overtaking lanes to ultimately provide continuous two lanes in each direction, and a third lane northbound from the foot of Mount Ousley to Clive Bissell Drive and a third southbound lane from Clive Bissell Drive to New Mount Pleasant Road. This was followed by deviations to replace sharp curves on steep gradients on the northern approach to Bellambi Creek and both approaches to Cataract Creek. A continuous Jersey median was subsequently installed in stages. Extensive truck management measures were also installed on the long, steep descent from Clive Bissell Drive into Wollongong during the 1980s, following a number of fatal truck crashes on this section.

The Mount Ousley Road section of Princes Motorway is sometimes not considered part of the freeway proper, as it is not built to full freeway standards, containing left-in/left-out intersections and the at-grade intersection at the foot of Mount Ousley, where the motorway proper diverges from Mount Ousley Road. This intersection is proposed to be replaced by a grade-separated interchange: the federal government announced funding for the interchange in May 2021, relocation of utility services is underway, and major construction is expected to start in 2024.

In November 2015, it was announced that the section between Bulli Tops and Picton Road would have a third lane added in each direction. As of 2019, detailed design works have been completed.

=== Southern section (Gwynneville to Yallah) ===
The construction of the first stage of Princes Motorway between Gwynneville and Yallah commenced in May 1959. This formed the majority of what was built as a north-south bypass of Wollongong central business district, and was the first section built of the Northern Distributor, an arterial road planned to run from Thirroul in the north to Dapto in the south. The CBD bypass was opened from Princes Highway at North Wollongong to Foley Street in December 1959, from Foley Street to Phillips Avenue in 1961 and from Phillips Avenue to Princes Highway at West Wollongong in July 1963. Duplication of the Northern Distributor from Gwynneville to West Wollongong was completed in 1965. The Northern Distributor was allocated as Freeway Route F8 in 1974, extended further north from the 1980s, and renamed Memorial Drive in 2010.

In March 1964 a connector road from Mount Ousley Road at the foot of Mount Ousley to the Northern Distributor in Gwynneville was opened as single carriageway road, and was duplicated in the early 1970s. The intersection with the Northern Distributor was later reconstructed to a grade-separated interchange, beginning in April 1996 and opening in December 1998.

Following completion of the Mount Ousley-Gwynneville connector, Southern Freeway subsumed a section of the Northern Distributor south of Gwynneville to West Wollongong, and continued making its way southward, then with the extension from West Wollongong to The Avenue at Figtree opening in 1967, and then from Five Islands Road to Northcliffe Drive in 1973 (albeit as a single carriageway, with duplication finished in 1975). The intermediate section from The Avenue to Five Islands Road, including the interchange with Masters Road, was opened in 1975; this section was also allocated Freeway Route F6 (which also allowed it to be locally known as the "F6 Freeway") in 1974. Construction then continued south from Northcliffe Drive to Kanahooka Road in 1978 (with duplication concluding in 1979), to Fowlers Road in 1981 (with duplication concluding in 1983), to Princes Highway near Tallawarra power station in 1986 (with duplication concluding in 1987), and to Yallah (in conjunction with grade separation of the junction with Princes Highway) in 1989.

=== As Princes Motorway ===
The passing of the Main Roads Act of 1924 through the Parliament of New South Wales provided for the declaration of Main Roads, roads partially funded by the State government through the Main Roads Board (MRB). With the subsequent passing of the Main Roads (Amendment) Act of 1929 to provide for additional declarations of State Highways and Trunk Roads, the Department of Main Roads (having succeeded the MRB in 1932) declared Southern Freeway as a motorway (under plan number 6006), on 8 October 1975, and was re-declared to cover each extension until it reached its southern terminus in Yallah; the motorway today still retains this declaration (under Motorway 6006).

Freeway Route F6 was allocated to the southern section of Southern Freeway in 1973, and along the entire northern section when it opened in 1975: as new sections of the freeway opened, Freeway Route F6 was extended along these new sections, but had already begun to be phased out in the mid-1908s to be replaced by National Route 1, and had disappeared by 1992; the Mount Ousley Road section was designated part of National Route 1 from 1975. With the conversion to the newer alphanumeric system in 2013, National Route 1 was replaced with route M1, and Southern Freeway and Mount Ousley Road were officially renamed as M1 Princes Motorway.

=== Albion Park Rail Bypass ===
At the southern end, Princes Motorway was extended to Oak Flats via a 9.8 km bypass of Albion Park Rail. The bypass completed the 'missing link' in the four-lane road between Sydney and Berry (since extended to Bomaderry/Nowra), and was constructed on a corridor which was identified by the Roads & Traffic Authority in a study in the mid 1990s. In 2013, Roads and Maritime Services (successor to the RTA) confirmed the reserved corridor to be suitable for the bypass.

The bypass was completed on 9 October 2021, several months ahead of schedule. The section of the bypass between Yallah and the Illawarra Highway (Terry Street) interchange was opened to traffic in May 2021. The northbound carriageway of the remainder of the bypass (ie north from the New Lake Entrance Road interchange to the Illawarra Highway interchange) opened to traffic on 7 August 2021. The remainder of the southbound carriageway was opened to traffic on 9 October 2021, thereby completing the bypass.

== Interchanges ==
LGA	Location	km	mi	Destinations	Notes
Greater Sydney
Sutherland	Waterfall	0.0	0.0	Princes Highway (A1) – Sutherland, Heathcote, Sydney CBD, Sydney Airport	Northern terminus of motorway and route M1, continues north as route A1 along Princes Highway
Sutherland	Waterfall	0.0	0.0	Princes Highway – Helensburgh, Woronora Dam	Northbound entrance and southbound exit only
Illawarra (Greater Wollongong)
Wollongong	Helensburgh	7.0	4.3	Princes Highway – Helensburgh, Woronora Dam to Lawrence Hargrave Drive – Stanwell Tops, Stanwell Park, Otford	
Wollongong	Thirroul	18.5	11.5	Princes Highway – Maddens Plains, Bulli, Corrimal, Sublime Point Lookout	Southbound entrance and exit only
Wollongong	Thirroul	20.1	12.5	Appin Road (B69) – Appin, Campbelltown	Southbound exit and northbound entrance only
Wollongong	Thirroul	21.0	13.0	Princes Highway (B65) – Thirroul, Bulli, North Wollongong	Southbound exit and northbound entrance only
Wollongong	Balgownie	29.2	18.1	Picton Road (B88) – Wilton, Picton	
Wollongong	Balgownie	30.3	18.8	Clive Bissell Drive – Mount Keira	Northbound entrance and exit only
Wollongong	Balgownie	33.2	20.6	New Mount Pleasant Road – Balgownie, Fairy Meadow	Southbound entrance and exit only
Wollongong	Mount Ousley	34.8	21.6	Mount Ousley Road – Mount Ousley, Fairy Meadow	No right turn northbound into Mount Ousley Road
Wollongong	Keiraville	35.8	22.2	Irvine Street (south) – Keiraville, Gwynneville; Northfields Avenue (east) – University of Wollongong	Northbound exit and entrance only
Wollongong	Keiraville	36.2	22.5	University Avenue – Keiraville, Gwynneville, University of Wollongong	Southbound exit and entrance only, northbound exit via Irvine Street
Wollongong	Gwynneville	36.3	22.6	Memorial Drive (B65) – North Wollongong, Gwynneville	No southbound entrance, access via University Avenue exit
Wollongong	West Wollongong	38.0	23.6	Robsons Road – West Wollongong	Northbound entrance only
Wollongong	Mangerton	38.6	24.0	Princes Highway – Wollongong, Figtree	No southbound entrance from Princes Highway eastbound
Wollongong	Figtree	40.1	24.9	Masters Road – Port Kembla, Wollongong, Spring Hill	No northbound exit
Wollongong	Unanderra	41.8	26.0	Five Islands Road – Unanderra, Port Kembla	
Wollongong	Berkeley	45.0	28.0	Northcliffe Drive – Kembla Grange, Warrawong, Port Kembla	
Wollongong	Kanahooka	47.7	29.6	Kanahooka Road – Dapto, Kanahooka, Koonawarra	Northbound entrance and southbound exit only
Wollongong	Dapto	49.4	30.7	Fowlers Road – Dapto, Koonawarra	Northbound entrance and southbound exit only
Shellharbour	Yallah	53.3	33.1	Princes Highway – Yallah, Haywards Bay, Albion Park Rail, Illawarra Regional Airport	No southbound entrance
Shellharbour	Albion Park	56.9	35.4	Terry Street (Illawarra Highway) (A48) – Albion Park, Robertson, Sutton Forest	Northbound entrance and southbound exit only
Shellharbour	Albion Park	57.8	35.9	Tongarra Road – Albion Park, Robertson, Sutton Forest	Northbound exit and southbound entrance only
Shellharbour	Oak Flats	62.0	38.5	Princes Highway (northwest) – Albion Park Rail, Oak Flats; New Lake Entrance Road (north) – Shellharbour; East-West Link (south) – Croom	Northbound entrance via East-West Link
Shellharbour	Oak Flats	62.0	38.5	Princes Highway (A1 south) – Kiama, Nowra, Batemans Bay, Melbourne	Southern terminus of motorway and route M1, route A1 continues along Princes Highway
1.000 mi = 1.609 km; 1.000 km = 0.621 mi: Incomplete access

== Proposed extensions ==
=== Northern extension ===
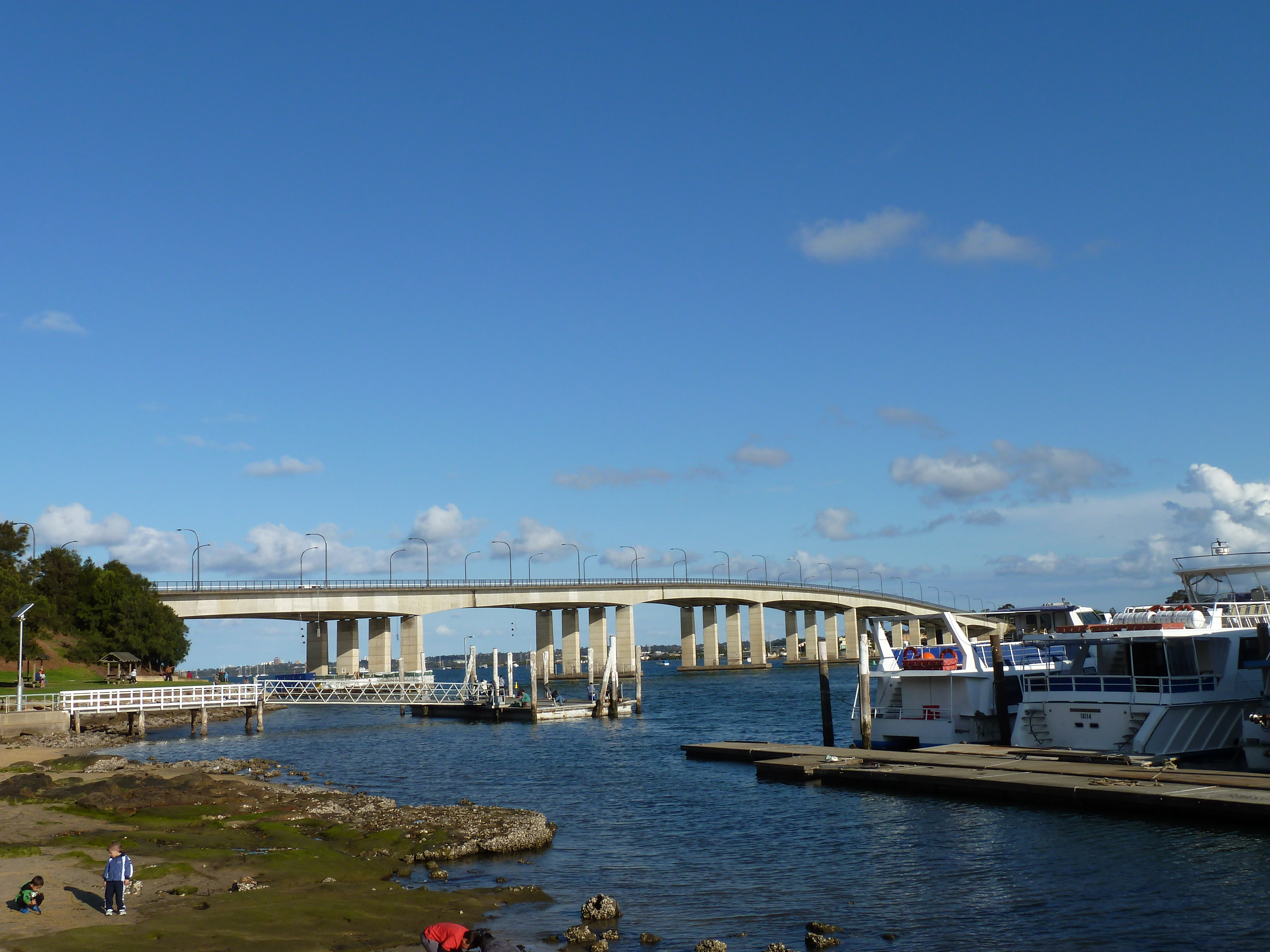
Captain Cook Bridge

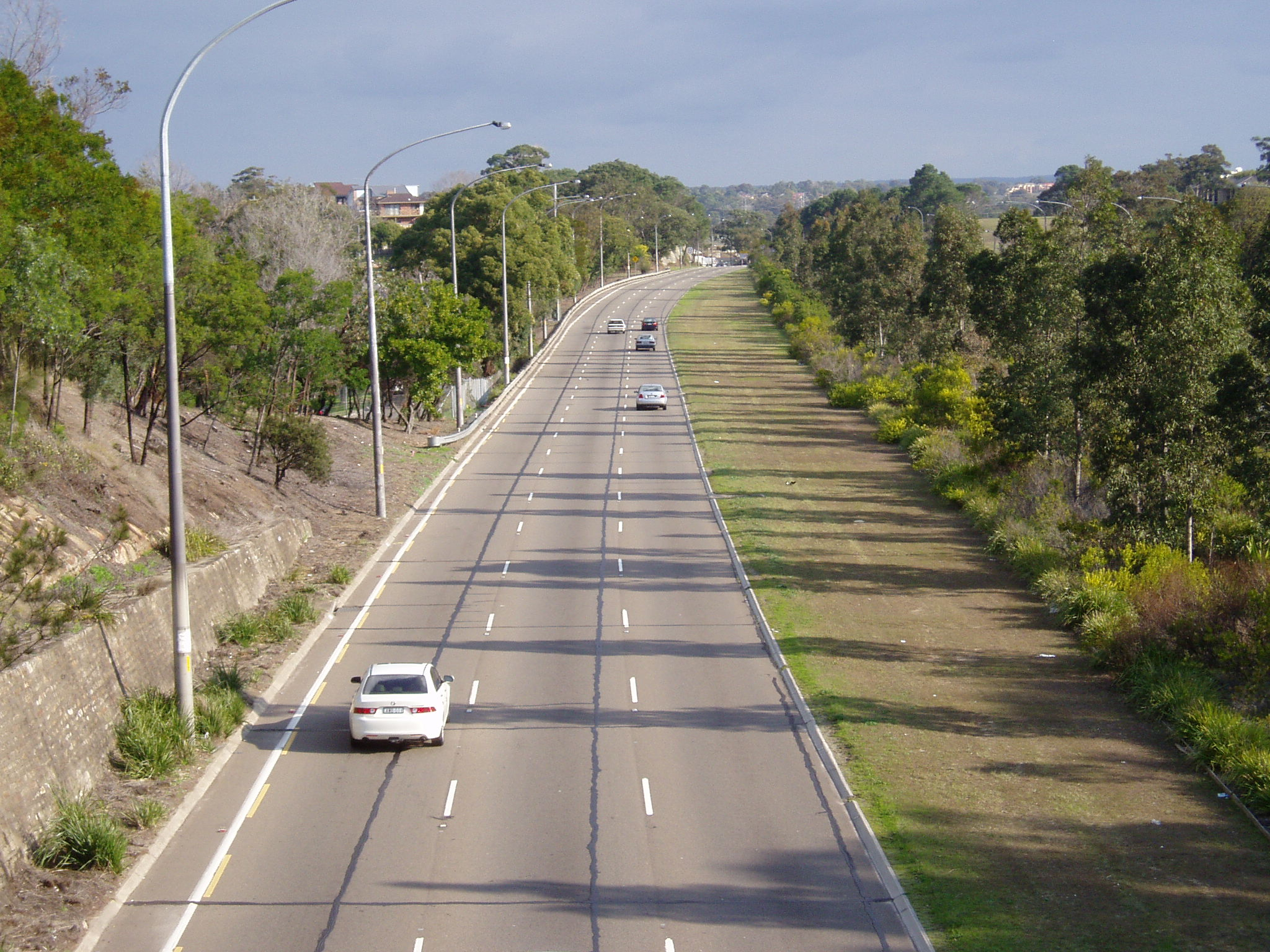
Taren Point Road

The six-lane Captain Cook Bridge (connecting Sans Souci to Taren Point) and a short joining section of Taren Point Road to the south are the only parts of the extension to be built

The County of Cumberland planning scheme of 1948 outlined an F6 extension from the current-day end-point at Waterfall. As such, an F6 corridor was set aside that passes through the Royal National Park from Waterfall to Campbell Road in St Peters. The land reservation tract currently passes through the suburbs of Loftus, Kirrawee, Gymea, Miranda, Taren Point, Sandringham, Sans Souci, Ramsgate, Monterey, Kogarah, Brighton-Le-Sands, Rockdale, Banksia, Arncliffe, Kyeemagh and Tempe.

Of the proposed extension, only the six-lane Captain Cook Bridge and a short connecting section of Taren Point Road to the south have been built. Establishment of the bridge section of the F6 extension began in 1962, expedited to replace the ferry service that had operated from Taren Point to Sans Souci since 1916. Captain Cook Bridge was opened in May 1965.

In the original plan, the F6 would have connected to the Western Distributor. Then, in August 1977, premier Neville Wran cancelled the inner section of the F6 link, which at the time had an estimated construction cost of $96 million. At the same time, Wran announced that the inner section reservation would be sold off and the proposed extension would instead terminate at St Peters, a medium density industrial suburb.

Prior to the 2007 federal election, the Liberal–Nationals (Coalition) government promised to allocate $20 million towards planning for the F6 extension. Although the Coalition lost the 2007 election, the funding was once again promised at the subsequent 2010 federal election. This funding would ensure the project is "shovel ready" when funding becomes available.

In the mid 2010s, the F6 extension project was revived under the Liberal–National coalition state government. This project has since been renamed M6 Motorway.

== See also ==
- Freeways in New South Wales
