= Waterfall, New South Wales =

Suburb of Sydney, Australia

Waterfall
- Suburb
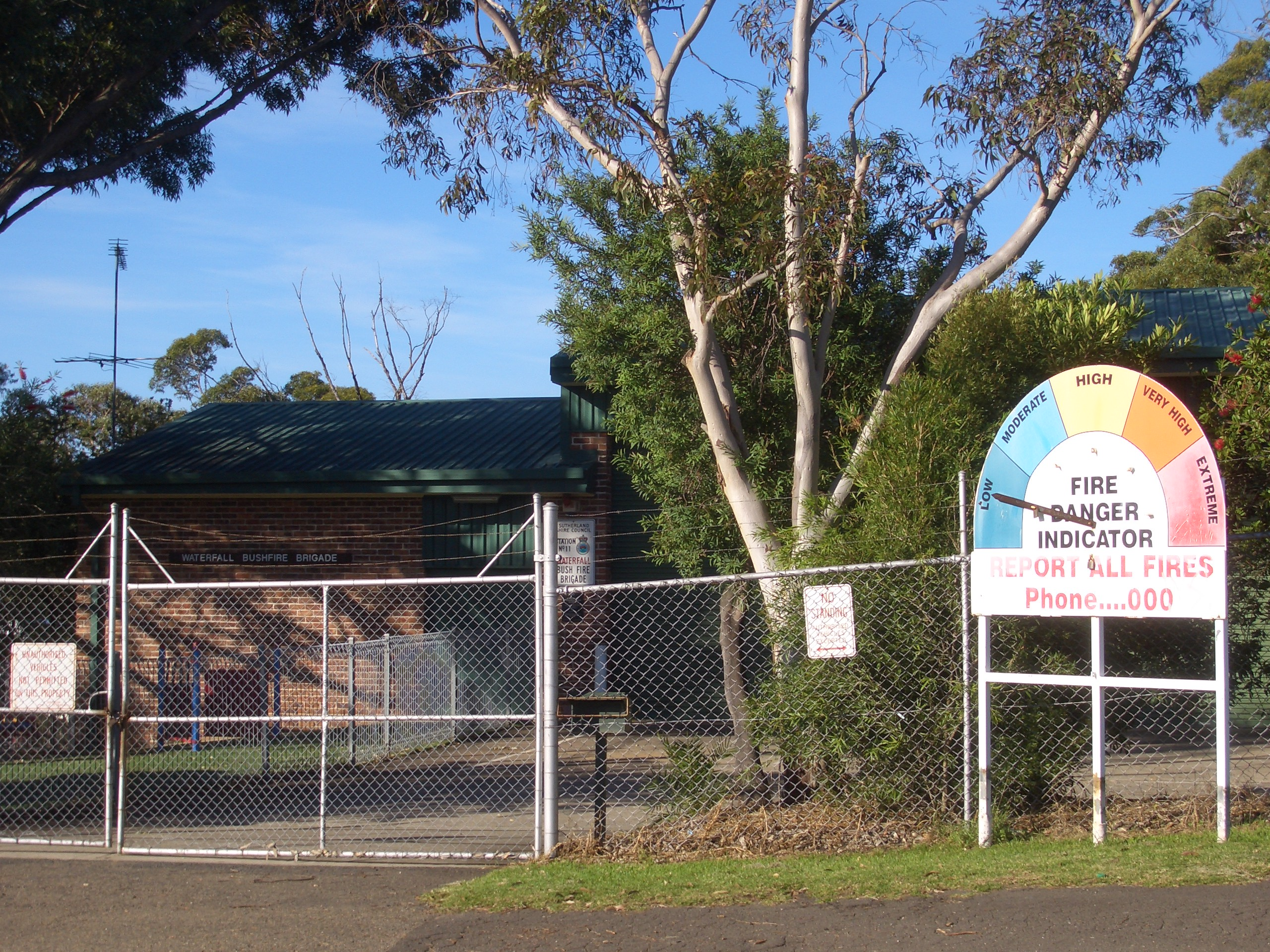
- Waterfall Bushfire Station

- Interactive map of Waterfall
- Country: Australia
- State: New South Wales
- City: Sydney
- LGA: Sutherland Shire
- Location: 40 km (25 mi) south of Sydney CBD; 42 km (26 mi) North of Wollongong
- Established: 1887

Government
  - State electorate: Heathcote
  - Federal division: Hughes
- Elevation: 230 m (750 ft)

Population
  - Total: 522 (2021 census)
- Postcode: 2233
Suburbs around Waterfall
	Heathcote	Audley
Heathcote National Park	Waterfall	Royal National Park
	Helensburgh

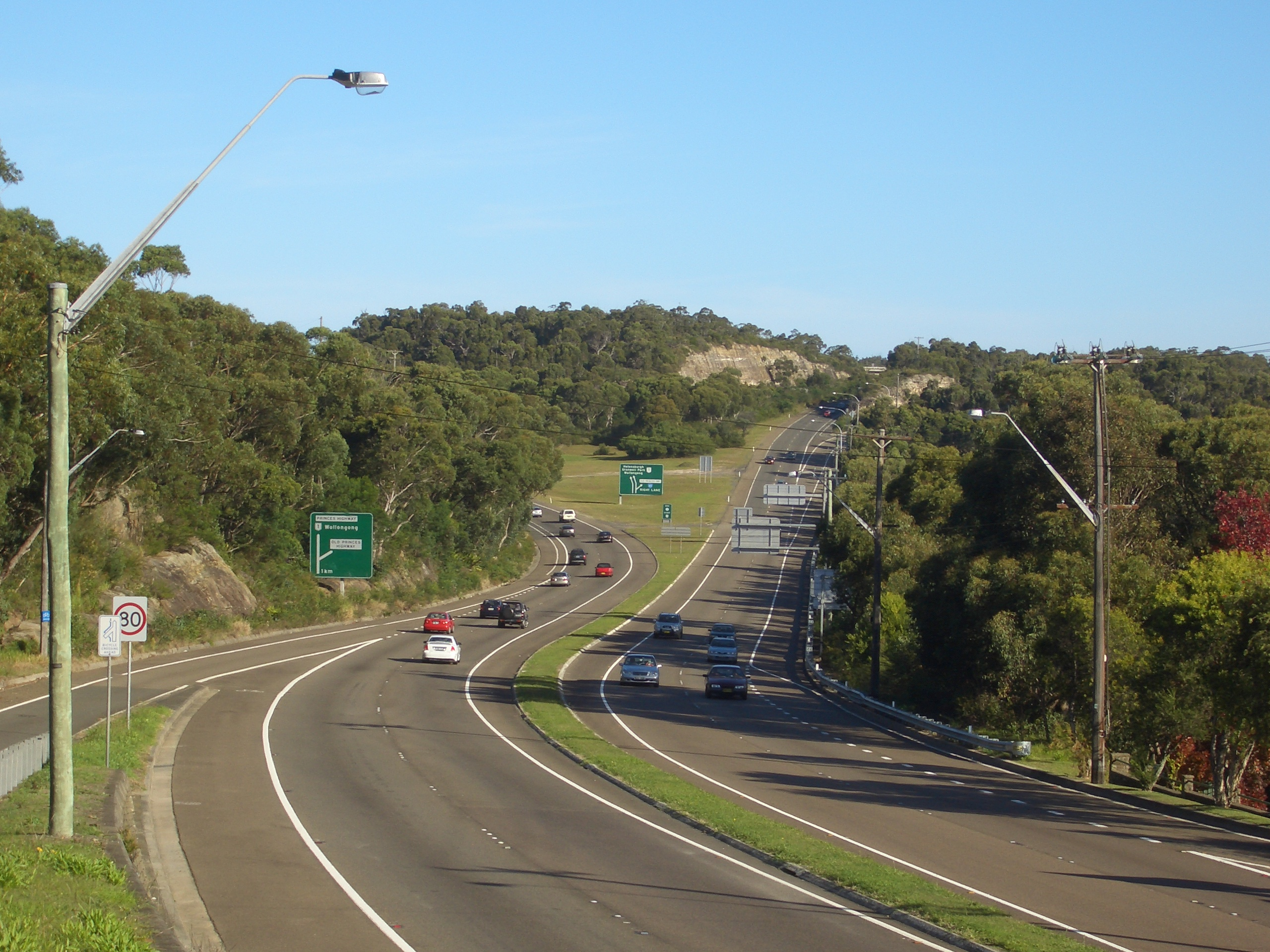
M1 Princes Motorway, view south from Waterfall onramp

Waterfall is a small suburb in southern Sydney, in the state of New South Wales, Australia. It is 40 kilometres (25 mi) south of the Sydney central business district in the Sutherland Shire. It is the southernmost suburb of Sydney in the eastern corridor, on the Princes Highway, bordering Helensburgh.

== Geography ==
Waterfall is bordered to the north by the suburb of Heathcote, with Engadine further north; by the Royal National Park to the east; and by Heathcote National Park to the west. Helensburgh is the next town, traveling south. Waterfall marks the southern border of the Sutherland Shire. It is approximately 230 metres above sea level.

Waterfall has only seven streets. The bushland gives the small suburb a natural surrounding and walking tracks lead from it into the neighbouring national parks. To the west is a dammed lake and behind it is Mount Westmacott.

== History ==
Waterfall began in 1884 as a railway construction workers' camp and staging point for the construction of the Illawarra railway line between Sydney and Wollongong in the late 19th century. The site was the last point where the railway alignment and Illawarra Road (now Princes Highway) were in close proximity. A large number of railway construction workers were needed for the extensive excavation and tunnelling works beyond Waterfall to the south. It is the site of the highest point on the line, with a steep rising gradient at one end, and a falling gradient at the other end, and sidings were provided in both directions to allow freight wagons to be stowed and shunted. A reservoir was built nearby and water pumped to the railway to re-water steam trains after their ascent. The original Waterfalls railway station opened in 1886. This railway station, railway buildings and houses were located 600m to the south of the present station and the school opened nearby. As rail traffic and facilities grew, the railway was duplicated and a larger, permanent settlement became established.

Waterfall derived its name either from the waterfalls close to the railway station or from steam trains re-watering or making their 'fall' for water. A South Waterfall existed until 1914. McKell Avenue, the southern border of the Royal National Park, was originally called Waterfall Road.

The Waterfall State Sanatorium was established in 1909 for the treatment of tuberculosis patients, some of whom were forcibly quarantined. Later, the facility was used for quarantine treatment during the influenza pandemic. The facility had its own cemetery. Later still, it became the Garrawarra Hospital and Garrawarra Centre aged care facility. Construction of Woronora Dam, southwest of Waterfall, from 1927, contributed to the growth of the settlement. A nudist community was established to the southwest of the settlement. A Boy Scout camp was built on a Crown lease to the west of the settlement. In 1973 Australia's first Community Advanced Driver Training Centre was opened in Waterfall but closed a few years later.

Bushfires have been a recurrent danger and destroyed Waterfall houses. On 3 November 1980, five volunteer firefighters were killed by a fireball that engulfed them and their truck on the Uloola track just east of the settlement.

The Waterfall train collision on 20 December 1994 involved two S-set electric trains which collided at low speed in the early hours of the morning during a shunting procedure at Waterfall station in the south of Sydney. Both trains were empty of passengers. Carriages jack-knifed in spectacular fashion onto the platform, causing demolition of a concrete ramp to the overbridge and part of the station canopy.

The Waterfall train disaster on 31 January 2003 involved an interurban train service operated by a Tangara, unit G7, which crashed just south of Waterfall. The cause of G7's crash was determined to be the heart attack of the driver and a failure of the safety equipment and the guard to stop the train.

Today Waterfall remains a small, ecologically suburban residential pocket of roughly 2.3 square kilometres, surrounded largely by both the Royal and Heathcote National Parks.

== Heritage listings ==
Waterfall has a number of heritage-listed sites, including:

- Woronora Dam Road: Woronora Dam

== Population ==
In the 2021 census, there were 522 people in Waterfall. 84.1% of people were born in Australia and 92.1% of people only spoke English at home. The most common responses for religion were No Religion 44.1% and Anglican 18.0%.

== Transport ==
Waterfall is the last suburb heading south on the Princes Highway before it leads into the Princes Motorway (formerly known as the F6 freeway) to the city of Wollongong.

Waterfall railway station is the terminus for the Sydney Trains suburban Illawarra railway line. However, some trains do terminate one stop further on at Helensburgh. Waterfall is also a stop on the Intercity South Coast Line, with platform 1 to Central and platform 2 to Port Kembla, Dapto and Kiama.

== Education ==
Waterfall's local primary school has only two rooms which have kindergarten to 2nd class in one room, and 3rd class to 6th class in another.

== Gallery ==
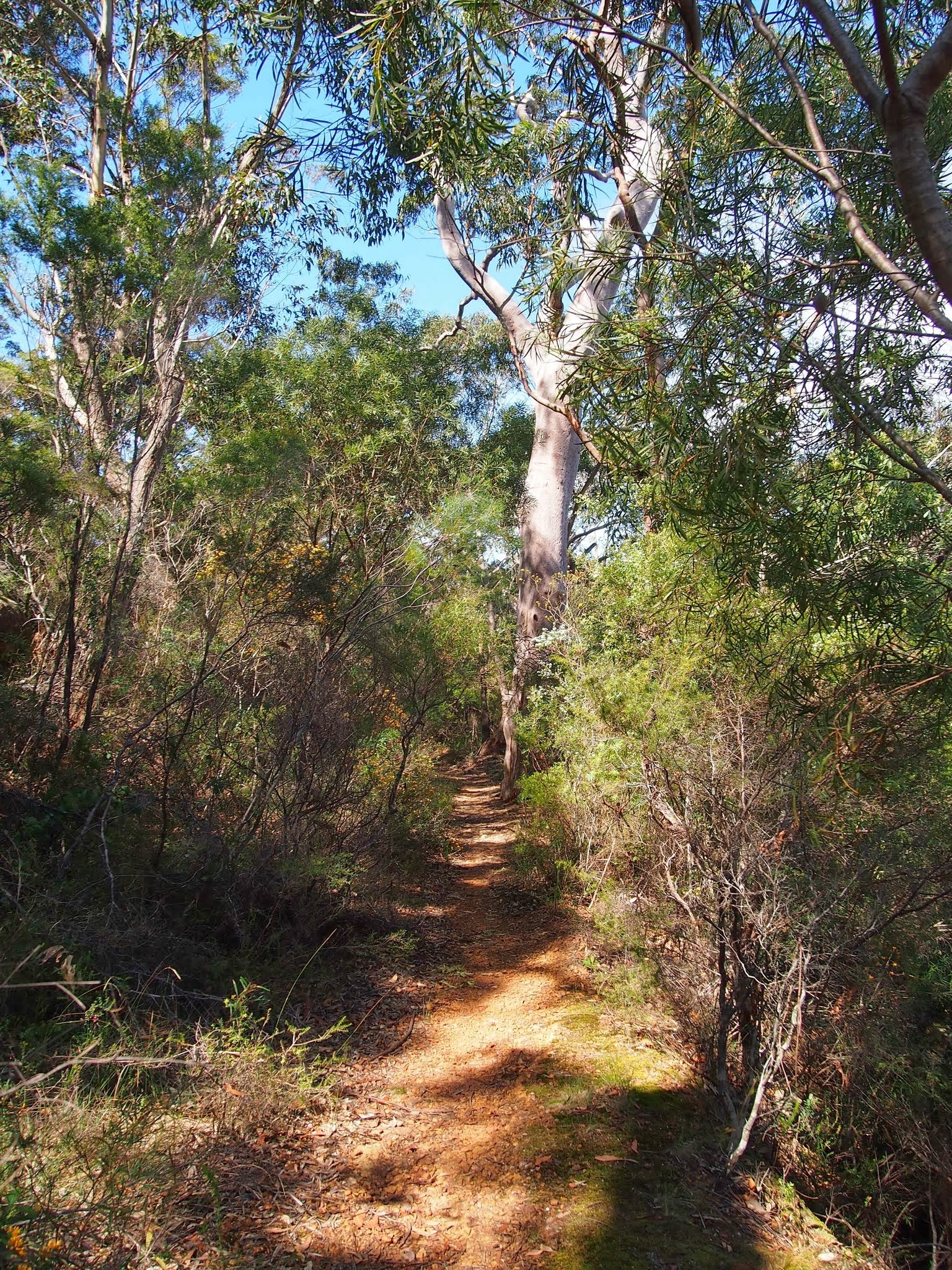
Riverside Drive (#1)

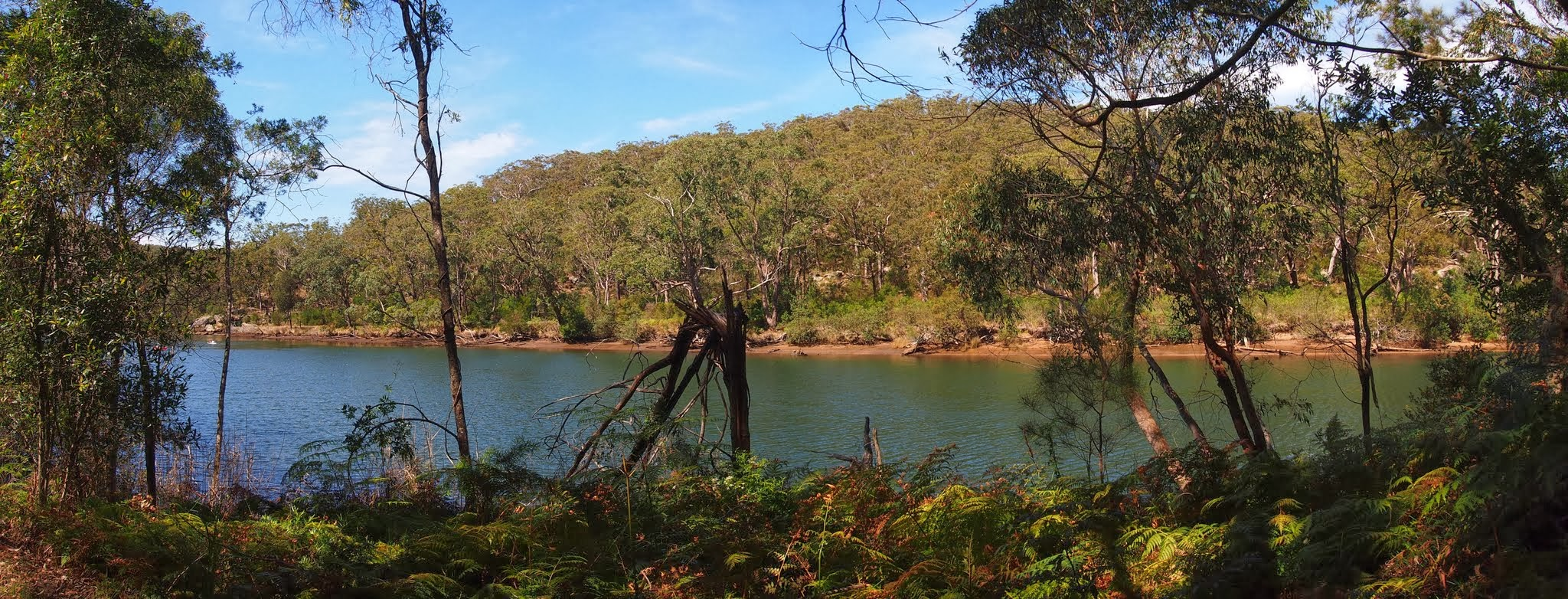
Riverside Drive (#2)

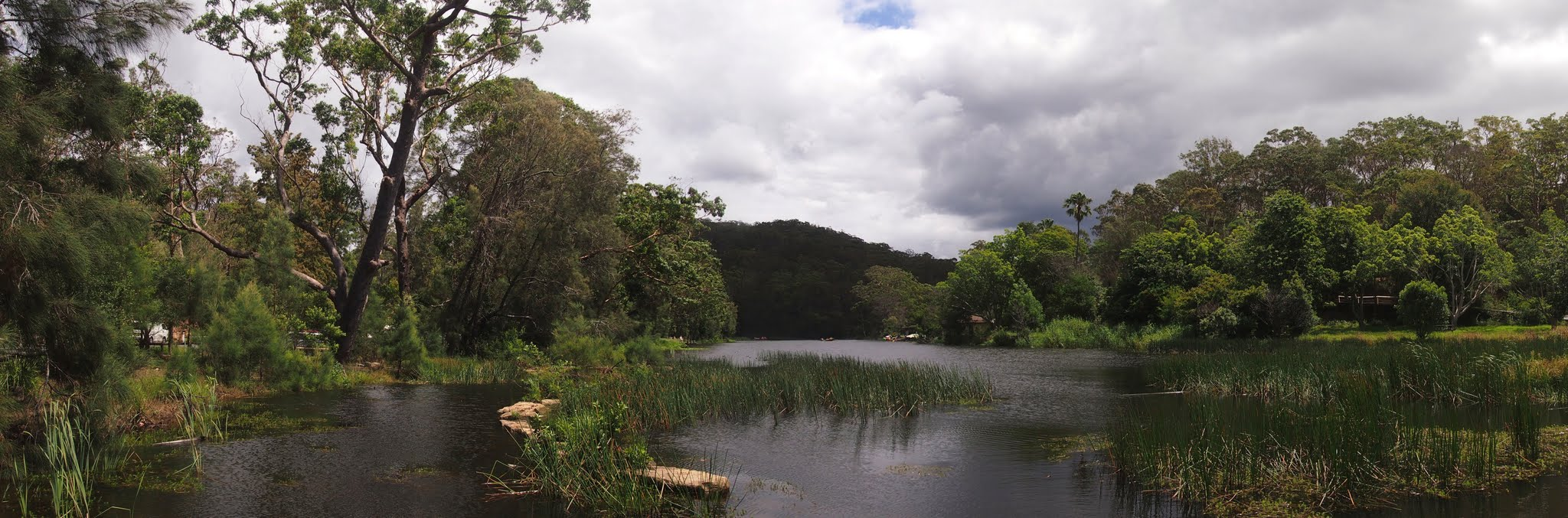
Audley Weir (#1)

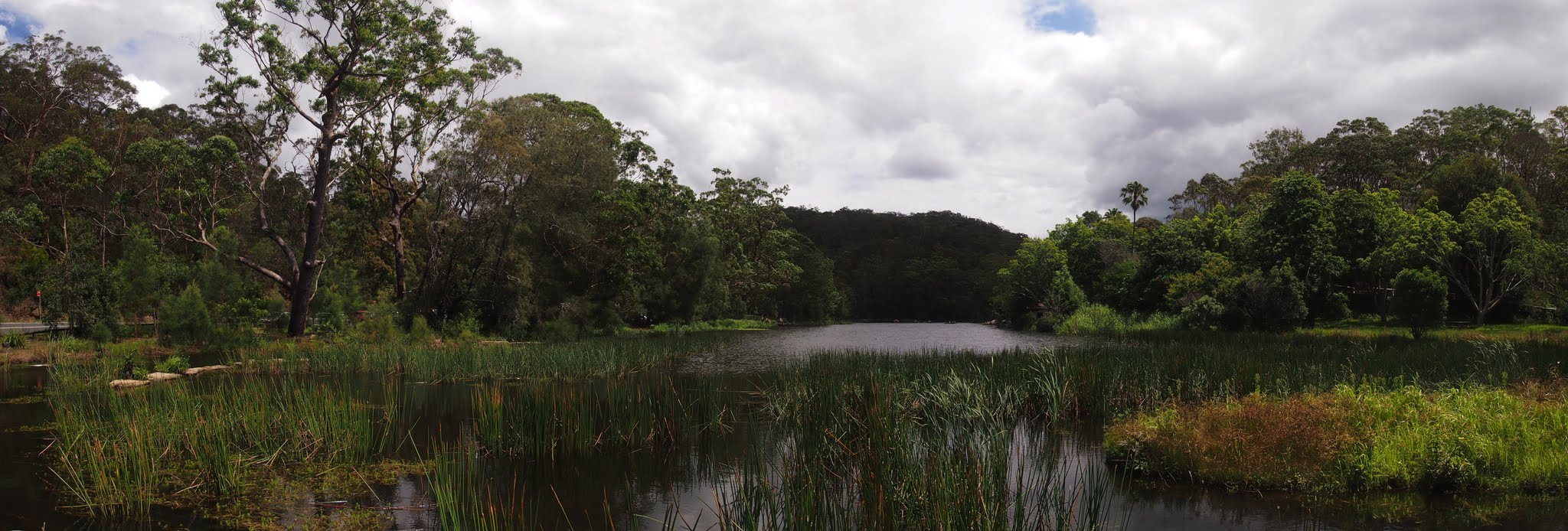
Audley Weir (#2)

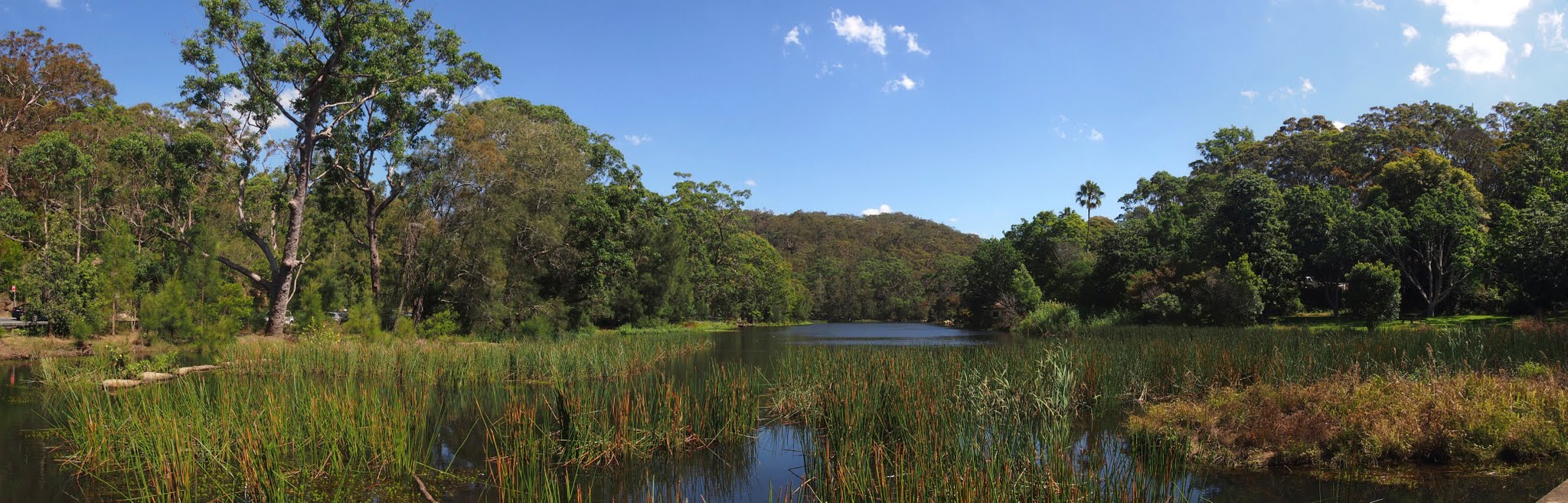
Audley Weir (#3)

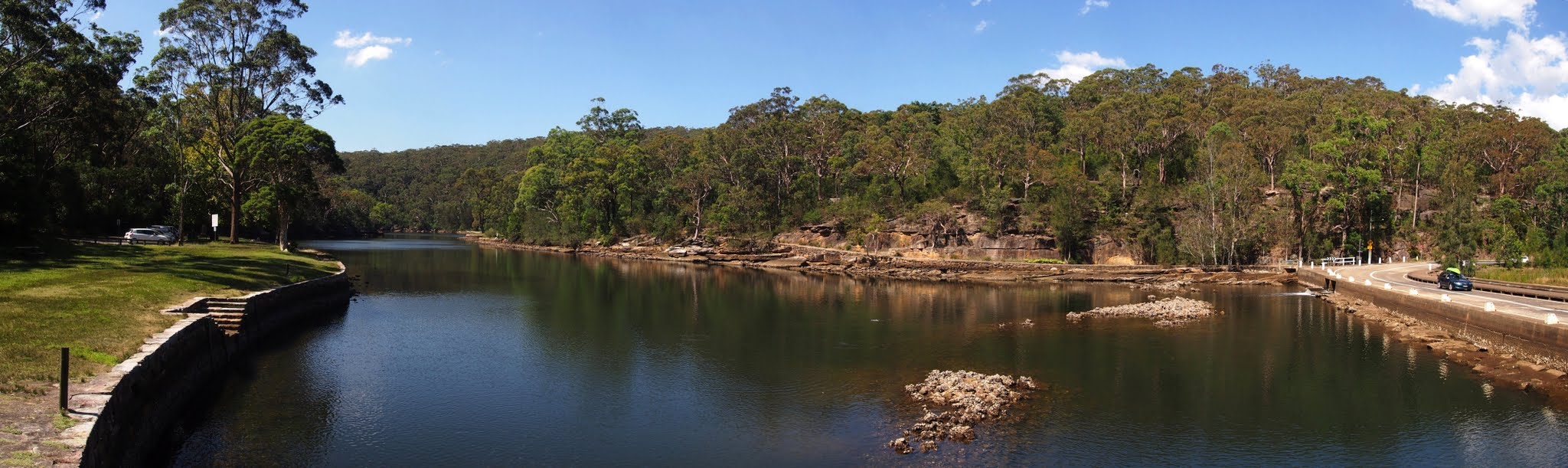
Audley Weir (#4)

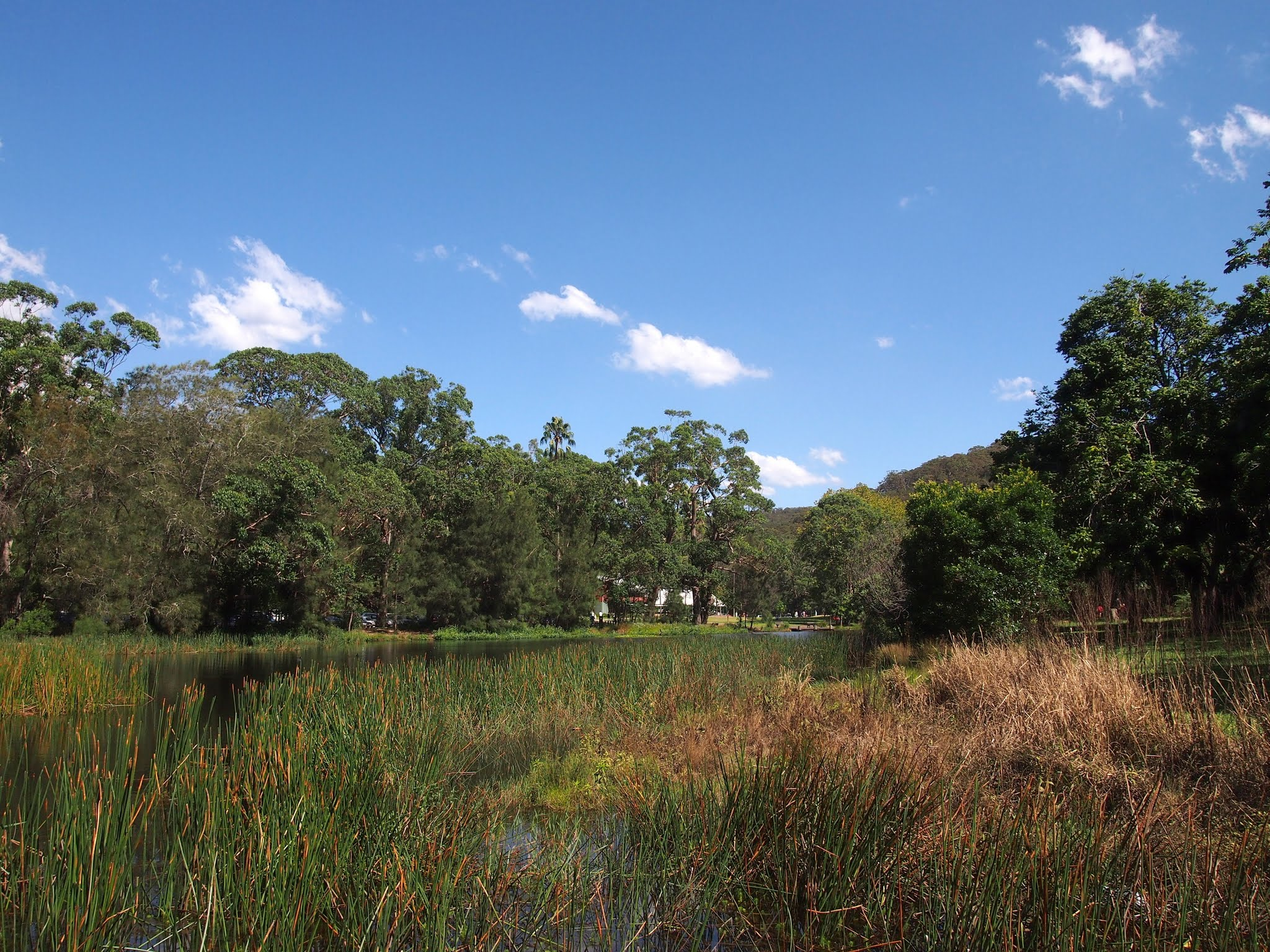
Audley Weir (#5)

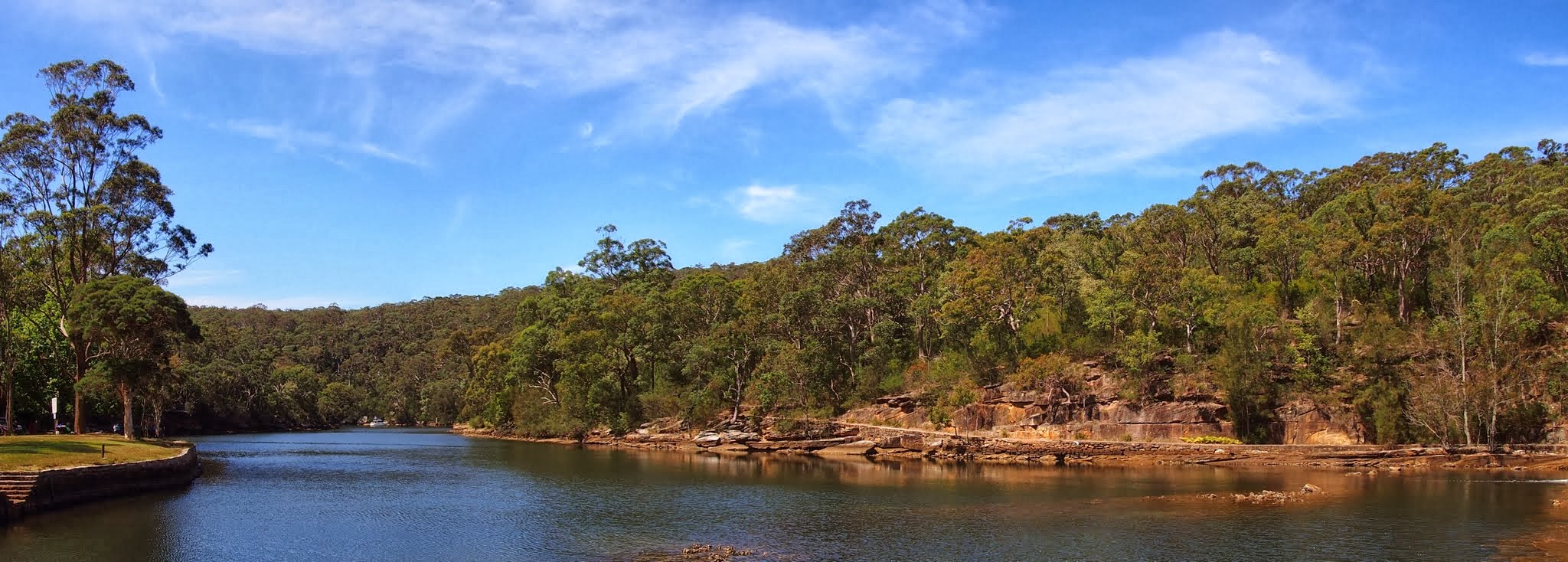
Audley Weir (#6)

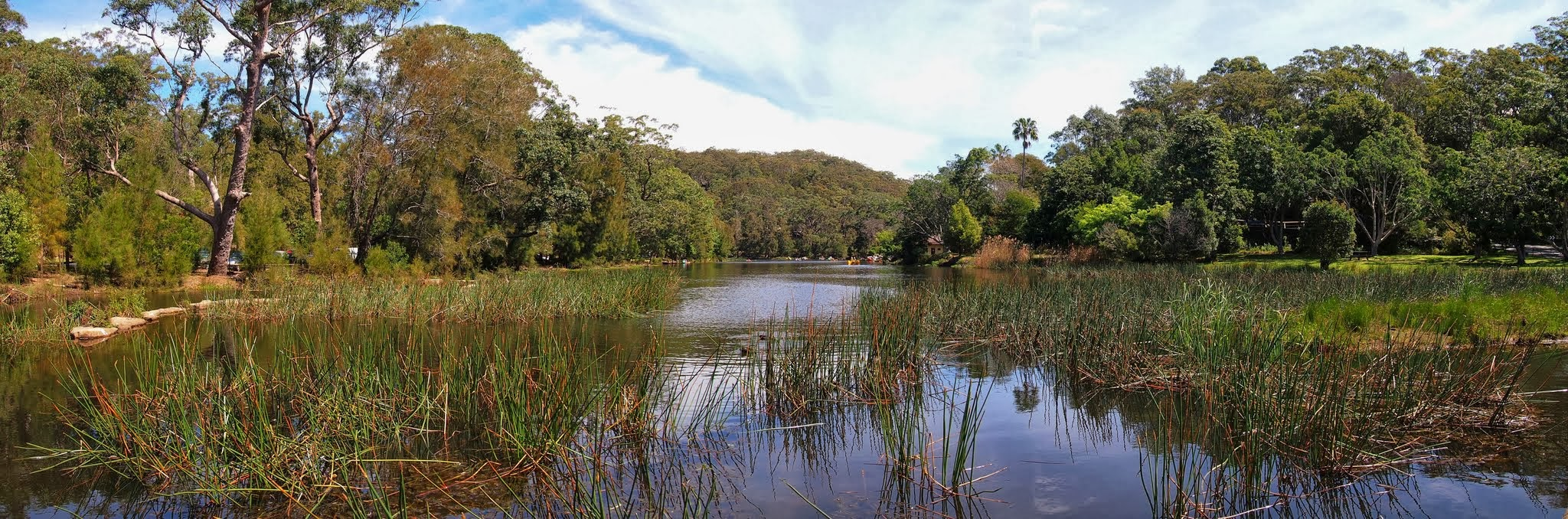
Audley Weir (#7)
