= Gwynneville, New South Wales =

Gwynneville
- Suburb
- Coordinates: 34°24′58″S 150°53′02″E
- Country: Australia
- State: New South Wales
- City: Wollongong
- LGA: City of Wollongong
- Location: 83 km (52 mi) from Sydney; 2 km (1.2 mi) from Wollongong

Government
  - State electorate: Wollongong
  - Federal division: Cunningham
- Elevation: 17 m (56 ft)

Population
  - Total: 3,139 (2021 census)
- Postcode: 2500
Suburbs around Gwynneville
Keiraville		North Wollongong
Keiraville	Gwynneville	Wollongong
West Wollongong	Wollongong	Wollongong

Gwynneville is an inner city suburb of Wollongong, New South Wales, Australia located approximately 2 km north-west of the city centre.

It was originally named Gwynne Ville after the Gwynne family who owned the property. It was sold in two large lots, both of which were subdivided. The first area, owned by Mr John Gwynne, consisted of 86 allotments, and went to auction on 3 March 1886. The second section, being bordered by Northfields Avenue, Gipps Rd and Murphy's Lane, was auctioned in 47 allotments by Mr William J Gwynne on 27 November 1886.

It has an area of bush heritage land on its southern side, located in and around Wiseman Park. There are two schools, Gwynneville Public School and Saint Brigid's Primary School. A neighbourhood shopping centre is located at the eastern end of Gipps Road and includes a post office, petrol station and food shops. Also in the area is the Wiseman Park Bowling Club and the Beaton Park Leisure Centre, a major sporting and fitness venue for the city. Wollongong city's main mosque, Omar Mosque is located in Gwynneville.

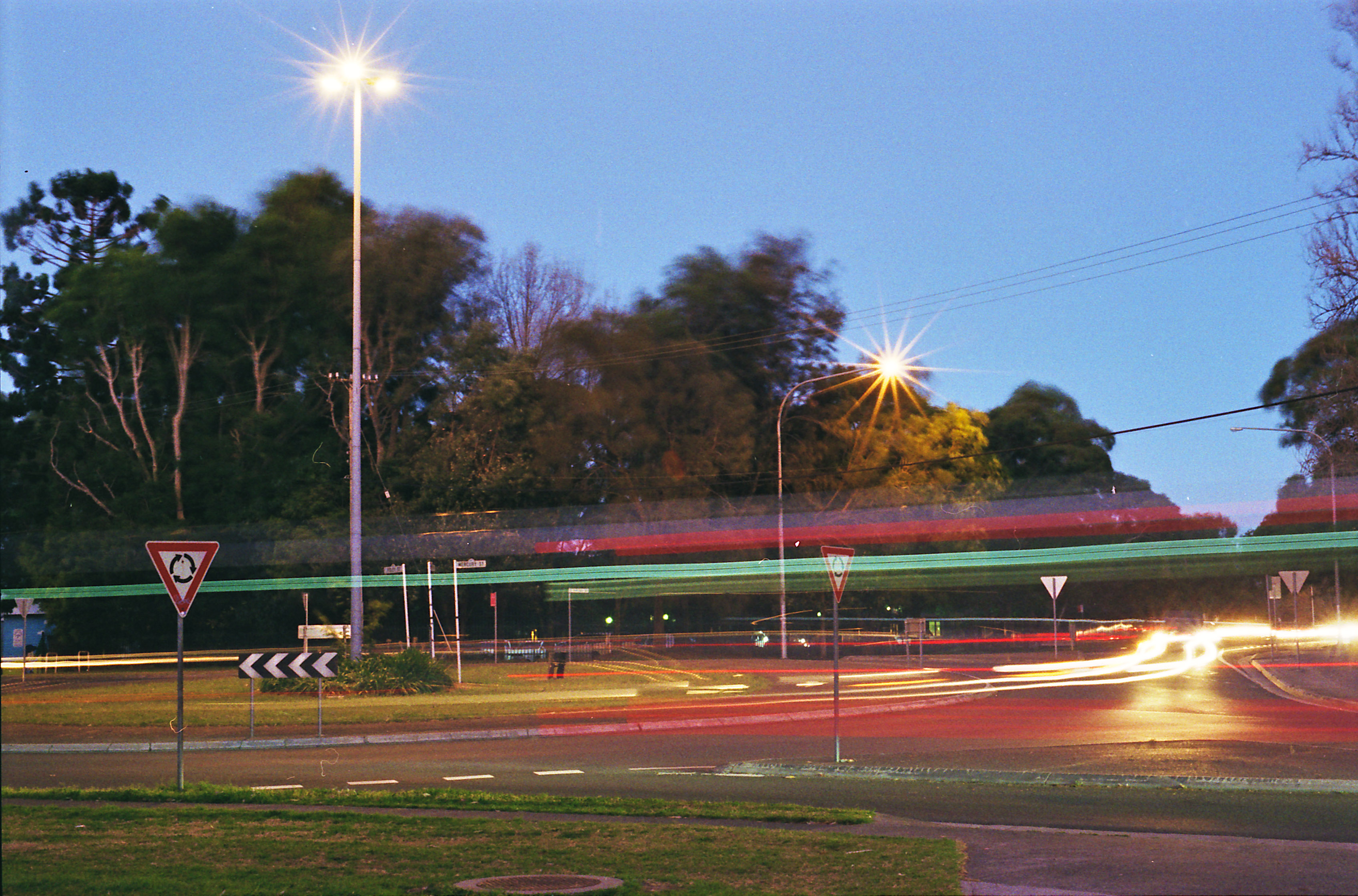
Throsby Drive and Foley Street roundabout, as seen looking towards Weerona College

Gwynneville is divided by the Princes Motorway and its interchange with Wollongong's Memorial Drive. However, being both centrally located and bordering the University of Wollongong to the north it remains a popular suburb for students seeking accommodation.
