= Scots Presbyterian Church, Kiama =

Scots Presbyterian Church
- Kiama Presbyterian Church
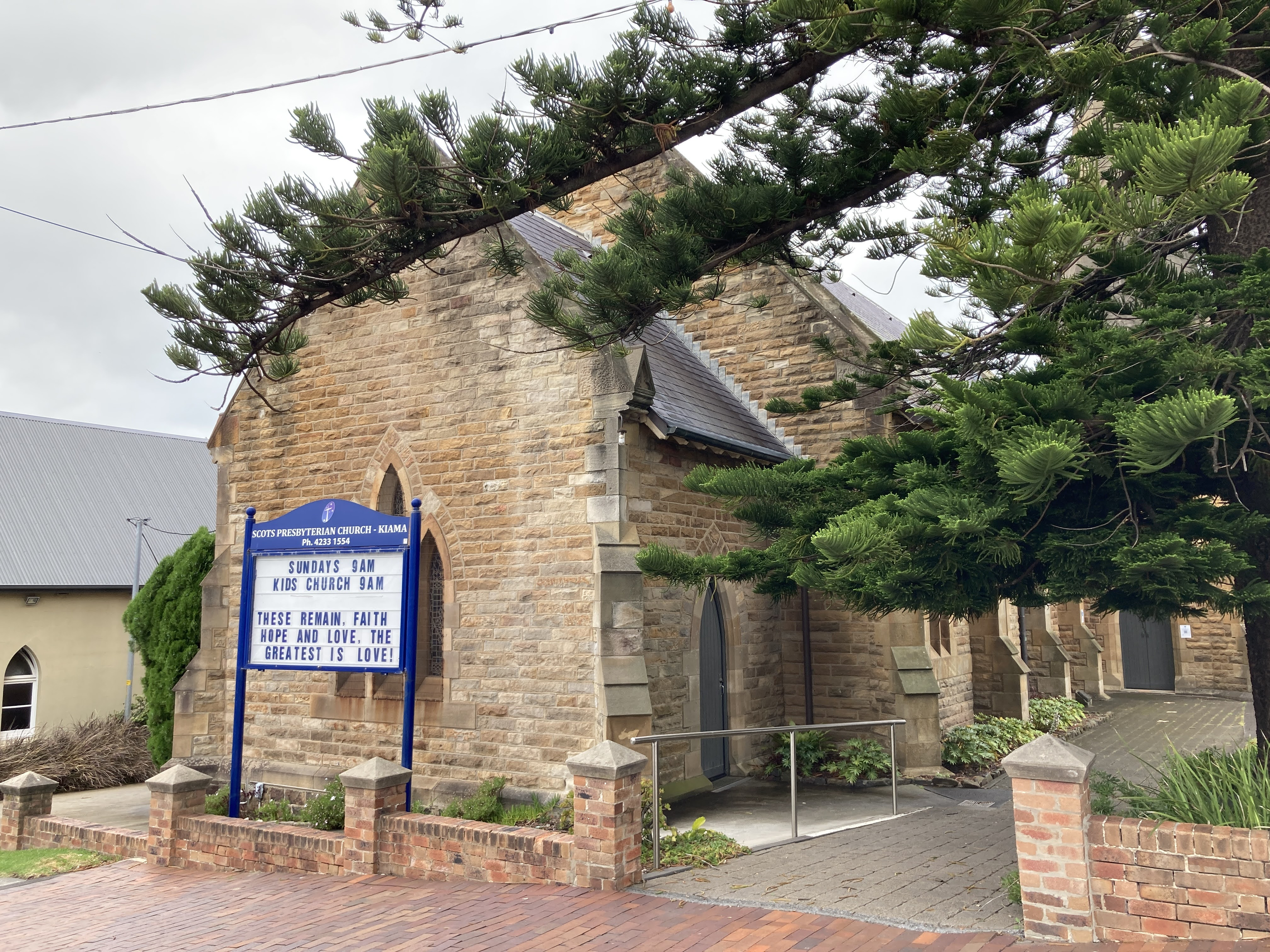
- Scots Presbyterian Church, 2021
- Scots Presbyterian Church
- 34°40′13″S 150°51′18″E
- Location: Shoalhaven Street, Kiama, Municipality of Kiama, New South Wales
- Country: Australia
- Denomination: Presbyterian
- Website: www.kiamapc.com.au

History
- Status: Church

Architecture
- Functional status: Active
- Designated: 4 March 1863 by Rev. Dr William Grant
- Architect: Thomas Rowe
- Architectural type: Church
- Style: Gothic Revival
- Years built: 1860–1863
- Construction cost: A£1991/7/1

Specifications
- Materials: Local sandstone, basalt, timber, Welsh Penryn slate roof

Administration
- Division: New South Wales
- Parish: Kiama

New South Wales Heritage Register
- Official name: Scots Presbyterian Church, Land and Trees
- Type: State heritage (complex / group)
- Designated: 2 April 1999
- Reference no.: 120
- Type: Church
- Category: Religion
- Builders: Messrs Moon & Simmons (Builders); Messing Walker Bros (Carpenters); Charles Richardson (Organ)

The Scots Presbyterian Church is a heritage-listed Presbyterian church at Shoalhaven Street, Kiama, Municipality of Kiama, New South Wales, Australia. It was designed by Thomas Rowe and built from 1860 to 1863 by builders Moon & Simmons and carpenters Walker Bros. It is also known as Kiama Presbyterian Church. It was added to the New South Wales State Heritage Register on 2 April 1999.

== History ==
This church is of early English architecture and was designed by Thomas Rowe of Sydney. Sandstone used in its construction was a gift from the Robb family on whose estate at Riversdale near the Minnamurra River it was quarried. Basalt for the foundations and inner walls came from Mr Carson's quarry in Kiama. Tenders for the construction of the Church (which replaced an earlier weatherboard structure used for worship) were called in December 1859, and the foundation stone laid in January 1860. The building was completed early in 1863, without the present spire and vestry, and the opening services took place on 4 March 1863. The minister at that time was the Rev. John Kinross. The opening was performed by the Rev. Dr William Grant of Shoalhaven, Moderator of the Eastern Synod of Australia. The sermon on that occasion was preached by the Rev. Dr Robert Steel of Sydney.

The total cost of the church was A£1991/7/1 and the debt on completion was £250. Messrs Moon and Simmons were the builders and Messrs Walker Bros, were the carpenters.

The building opened without the spire or vestry, but it was completed to original plan by the addition of a vestry in 1895 and the bell tower spire in 1898. These two additions were substantially financed through funds obtained by the railway resuming approximately half the Church land and effectively bisecting the property. Stained glass windows were also installed at this time.

In 1893 the railway resumed a portion of the Church land and largely spoiled the setting. Deliberations took place as to the advisability of building a new Church on another site, but this step was finally decided against. In 1897 a move was begun to complete the Church by the addition of the vestry and the spire above the tower. This project was completed in 1898.

The bell tower was restored in 2010, having been funded by the sale of the little-used St Stephen's Presbyterian Church, Jamberoo.

== Description ==
A simple rectangular plan-form, the church is entered by two gabled porches, the whole covered by a slate-clad hammer-beam roof and complemented by the eccentrically placed square-based tower with its broad stone spire (now rendered), this latter feature was completed in 1898. The rough-dressed sandstone walls of the Church, built up on coursed basalt rubble foundations are enlivened by dressed quoins, parapets, buttresses and reveals to the building's lancet-form openings. Internal finishes comprise stone flagging, painted plastered walls with later sedar panelling (1953) and painted timber ceiling, complemented by fine cedar pews arranged in three banks. The geometric east windows contain noted examples of painted pictorial glass, installed in 1897. The manual pipe organ by Waller and Sonsi is an original example of the work of Charles Richardson (1907) and was donated to the Church in 1907. The Sunday School, a simple gable-roofed rendered masonry structure located to the north of the Church, was constructed in the same year.

The building is constructed of basalt freestone walls faced externally with sandstone blocks including buttresses. The interior of the solid walls being plastered and lined to assemble block work. The roof is board lined internally and externally covered in Welsh Penryn Slates supported with hammer beam trusses supported on stone corbels.

The physical condition of the church was reported as good as at 3 July 1998, with high archaeological potential.

The integrity of the building is virtually complete as from effective completion in 1898, maintenance works have sought to retain materials or surfaces as close as practical to the original.

== Heritage listing ==
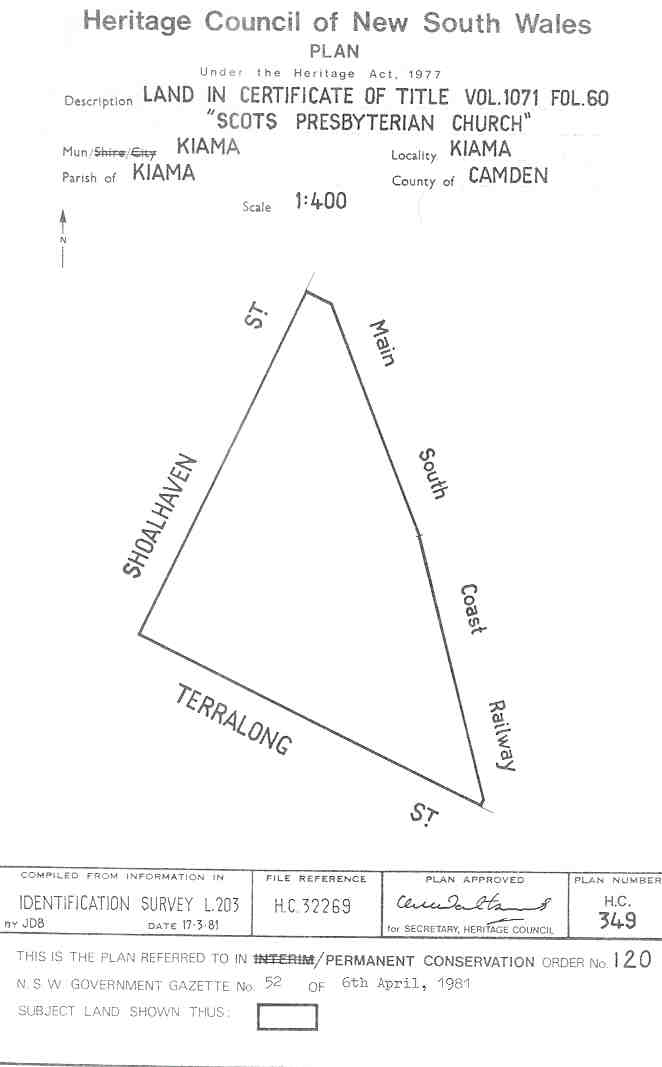
The boundaries of the heritage area

It occupies a highly visible aspect in the Kiama Central Business District. It is a major component in the streetscape and is an unmodified example of the 19th-century Gothic Revival style of its architect / designer using local materials and featuring pleasing proportions in a location of significance and impact.

Scots Presbyterian Church, Land and Trees was listed on the New South Wales State Heritage Register on 2 April 1999 having satisfied the following criteria.

The place is important in demonstrating the course, or pattern, of cultural or natural history in New South Wales.

It is central to Kiama's development, built in 1863 to replace on earlier wooden building on the foreshore of the adjacent block beach.

The place is important in demonstrating aesthetic characteristics and/or a high degree of creative or technical achievement in New South Wales.

It is an unaltered sample of early English gothic architecture as interpreted by its architect Thomas Rowe.

The place has a strong or special association with a particular community or cultural group in New South Wales for social, cultural or spiritual reasons.

It has a central location in Kiama and has been in continuous use as a place of worship.

The place has potential to yield information that will contribute to an understanding of the cultural or natural history of New South Wales.

It has a wide variety of building materials both local and imported and employed a variety of trades and craftsman in its construction.

The place possesses uncommon, rare or endangered aspects of the cultural or natural history of New South Wales.

The item is a rare example of the architects work in a basically unaltered form.

The place is important in demonstrating the principal characteristics of a class of cultural or natural places/environments in New South Wales.

The item is a good example of a new gothic influence transported into an Australian setting. It is representative because of its simplification of this theme and its functionality in a regional setting in a community establishing (in the 1860s) building.

== See also ==
- List of Presbyterian churches in New South Wales
