= St Stephen's Presbyterian Church, Jamberoo =

St Stephen's Presbyterian Church (former)
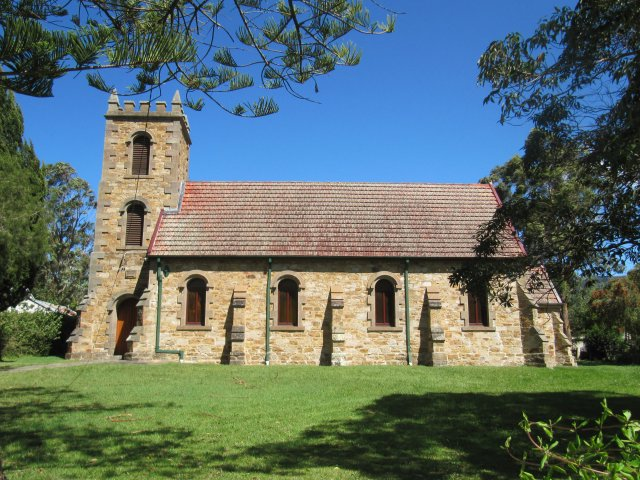
- The former St Stephen's Presbyterian Church, now privately-owned
- St Stephen's Presbyterian Church (former)
- 34°38′56″S 150°46′27″E
- Location: 2 Allowrie Street, Jamberoo, Municipality of Kiama, New South Wales
- Country: Australia
- Previous denomination: Presbyterian (1839–2001)

History
- Status: Church (former)
- Founder: Rev. John Kinross
- Dedication: Saint Stephen

Architecture
- Functional status: Closed and preserved
- Designated: 26 January 1876
- Architect: John Colley
- Architectural type: Church (former)
- Years built: 1875
- Closed: 2001

Specifications
- Materials: Sydney sandstone; Local cedar; Marseilles tiles

New South Wales Heritage Register
- Official name: St. Stephen's Presbyterian Church (former); St Stephen's Presbyterian Church
- Type: State heritage (built)
- Designated: 2 April 1999
- Reference no.: 121
- Type: Church
- Category: Religion
- Builders: John and James Marks; D. L. Dymock; W. Stewart

St Stephen's Presbyterian Church is a heritage-listed former Presbyterian church at 2 Allowrie Street, Jamberoo, Municipality of Kiama, New South Wales, Australia. It was designed by John Colley and built in 1875 by John and James Marks, D. L. Dymock and W. Stewart. It was added to the New South Wales State Heritage Register on 2 April 1999. The church building was sold to private interests in 2009.

== History ==
The first white settlers came to the Jamberoo District during the 1820s following the initial granting of land rights, but it was not until the 1830s that the nucleus of a settlement evolved. Dr. Robert Menzies, a young Scottish naval doctor, and his wife Margaret, took up residence at Jamberoo on 6 May 1839, in a small cottage on their recently purchased property. They, in common with a number of other colonists from Scotland and from Northern Ireland, were of the Presbyterian communion. The importance they attached to their faith is illustrated by the fact that within a few months of their arrival Presbyterian services of worship were being conducted in Dr. Menzies' barn by the Rev. John Tait, MA, the first minister of the Church of Scotland in Illawarra. Mr. Tait preached from his home base in Wollongong as far south as the Shoalhaven from 1837 until his transfer to Parramatta in 1841. Dr. Menzies built "Minnamurra House" in the early 1840s, which still stands today. The barn in which the first Presbyterian service was held stood until 1940.

The township of Jamberoo was subdivided from Michael Hyam's grant in 1841. Mr. Hyam, a Jew, gave blocks to some of the Churches, including the Presbyterian. In 1842 a church-school was built by the Presbyterians on their land at a cost of $70. It was made of slabs and plastered inside being constructed in the main by voluntary labour. The building was used on Sundays as church and Sunday School; other denominations used it at times. On weekdays it served as a school. It appears to have been the first Church building in the southern Illawarra.

The Rev. Cunningham Atchison, who succeeded Mr. Tait in 1841, continued to minister to the whole of Illawarra and conducted services at Jamberoo as often as possible. Ministers of other denominations were also invited to conduct worship, and Dr. Menzies conducted the church services on occasions when no minister was available in Jamberoo.

The Disruption of the Church of Scotland in 1843 was followed by a Disruption in the Synod of Australia. The Jamberoo and Kiama Presbyterians gave their allegiance to the Free Church party and waited for their own minister from that Church. Until their minister arrived the congregation received strong leadership from Mr. Robert Taylor, a divinity student of the Free Church of Scotland.

The Rev. George Mackie, having arrived from Scotland, was inducted on 24 October 1849, at Jamberoo as Free Church minister of Leawarra and Shoalhaven, with Kiama as its centre. As the population grew, portions to the north and south were separated until the charge embraced only the districts centred upon Kiama and Jamberoo. Mr. Mackie exercised a fruitful ministry in the area until his translation to Victoria in 1857. He had resided at Jamberoo to late 1854 when he moved into the newly built Manse at Kiama.

The second Minister of Kiama-Jamberoo was the Rev. John Kinross, B.A., later D.D. Newly arrived from Scotland, he was ordained and inducted into the charge on 29 December 1858, and proved to be an outstanding pastor as well as a scholar. In 1861 he married Elizabeth, one of the four daughters of Dr. Menzies. John Kinross never severed his link with the area, for, even after his translation to the office of the first Principal of St. Andrew's College, University of Sydney, in 1875, he spent the long vacations in his cottage overlooking the Jamberoo township and its people whom he loved. He retired to and died in this cottage on 16 October 1908.

Early in the ministry of Dr. Kinross, 1862, the old Jamberoo Church was enlarged. In 1874 the congregation met and resolved to build a new and larger church to accommodate the increasing number of worshippers. John Colley, a member of one of the district's foremost pioneering families and a devout servant of the Church, drew up the plans and together with Messrs. John Marks, James Marks, D. L. Dymock, and W. Stewart superintended the construction of the present St. Stephen's which was opened and dedicated in the presence of over 1,500 people on Australia Day, 26 January 1876. The total cost was £1,060/19/1. The only debt remaining, that of £70, was cleared at the opening by a generous gift by the Messrs. Marks. The Church furnishings are made from some of the finest cedar to be seen anywhere.

The original church included a wooden bell tower on top of the existing stone tower; however, this was demolished in the 1940s. Following the opening of the new church the old one was repaired and incorporated in a Sunday School Hall. It was unfortunately destroyed by fire in 1972.

On 5 May 1979 the Presbyterian Church of Australia nominated St Stephen's Presbyterian Church Jamberoo. A Permanent Conservation Order was placed over the Church on 6 April 1981. It was transferred to the State Heritage Register on 2 April 1999.

The strength of the Presbyterian cause in Jamberoo diminished along with the population of the valley in the late twentieth century. In 1970 services of worship ceased altogether and the Church building took on a forlorn neglected appearance. It reopened in 1971 due to the efforts of the local congregation and was restored for its centenary in 1976. Funding was received from the Heritage Council in 1984 for damp-proofing and associated works.

Services at the church continued until c. 2001. After four years of only being used for the occasional wedding, it was listed for sale in 2005 due to mounting costs for ground maintenance and insurance.

Local residents initially hoped to buy the building to serve as a dairy museum; however, they were unsuccessful in obtaining government funding. After some controversy around claims that there were unmarked graves on the site, subsequently dispelled after an archaeological study, it was subsequently sold to a private buyer for $580,000 in June 2009. The church stated that the proceeds would be used towards repairing the bell tower at Scots Presbyterian Church, Kiama.

In 2018, the former church was operating as holiday accommodation called "The Belltower".

== Description ==
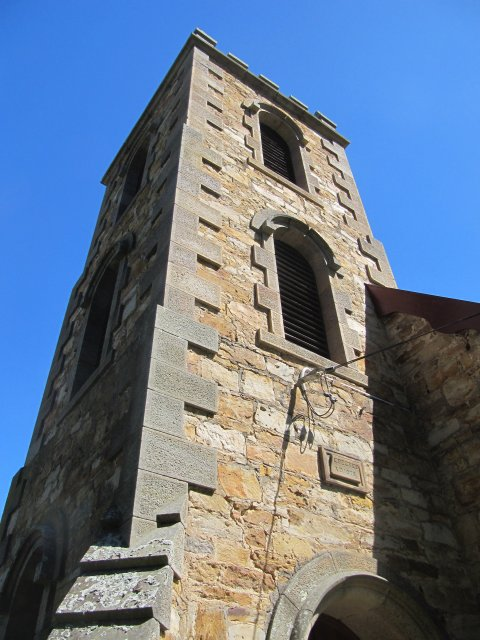
Tower

Church

St. Stephen's Church has a simple rectangular plan with a square-based tower incorporating the entry to the building at its eastern end and a small attached vestry at the western end. It construction employed coursed sandstone rubble with dressed quoining and weathering to buttresses and the tower's battlemented parapet. Openings feature simple label-moulded semi-circular heads. Internally, finishes and furniture are of local cedar. The building's substantial trussed gable-ended roof with elegant barge decoration has undergone replacement of its original shingle cladding with Marseilles tiles.

Site

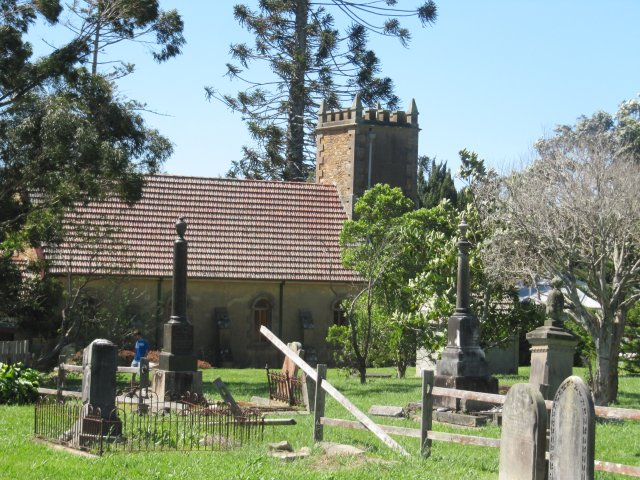
Cemetery beside the church

St. Stephen's Cemetery lies behind the church and adjacent to the Anglican and Uniting Church Cemeteries. The site is mown bare except for a small patch of crocus bulbs in the centre. A large blackberry bush which has engulfed several monuments dominates the south-west section. The stone church and large Araucaria pine trees form an appropriate back drop, which includes a small besser block amentieis block. There is no evidence of early layout.

A cemetery on this site dates from 1859. A white weatherboard house, formerly the early church is at the rear of the stone church (from a 1903 photograph). This was still extant in 1963. The area to the rear of the 1876 church contains a small toilet block, the remains of an early cemetery on the site and a tree line which is set out as an indicative eastern boundary to the burials. The evident cemetery monuments are restricted to the western side of the rear allotment with both marble and sandstone stelae represented. Historical evidence from the 1860 cemetery regulations suggests that they were purposefully set out from the south and along the western boundary from an early period.

The tree line eastern "boundary" of these burials runs north to south approximately 10m east of the western allotment boundary which is represented by a post and rail fence. All visible monuments of the Presbyterian cemetery are contained within the area bounded by this tree line and the western fence. To the east of this tree line is an open grassed area with some faint undulations observable in the surface. The distance from the tree line to the east boundary of the allotment is approximately 20–22 metres (66–72 ft). Closer to the church is the area which anecdotal evidence suggests may contain unmarked children's graves. This area also shows evidence of substantial disturbance from sewer lines associated with the toilet block and septic tank.

Situated at the western end of Jamberoo and enclosed by a timber picket fence to its Allowrie Street frontage and enclosed by a timber picket fence to its Allowrie Street frontage, St Stephen's and it grounds, which include mature camphor laurels (Cinnamomum camphora), bunya pine (Araucaria bidwillii) and Norfolk Island pines (Araucaria heterophylla) are a distinctive element of Jamberoo's townscape, prominent in the western approach to the town from Churchill Street.

== Heritage listing ==
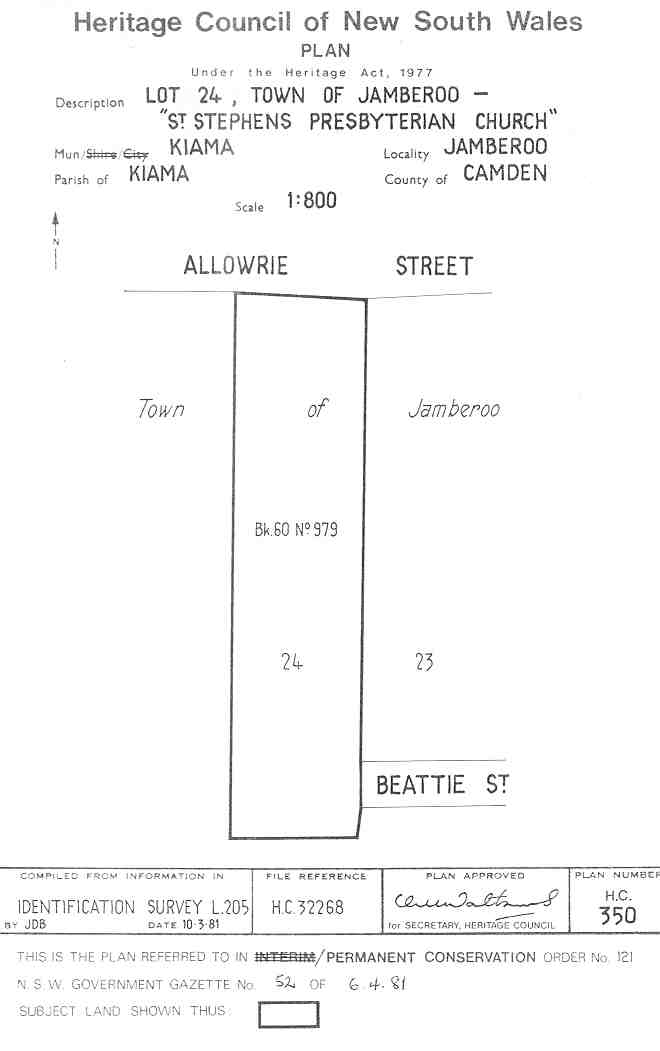
Heritage boundaries

Constructed in 1875, St Stephen's Presbyterian Church Jamberoo is of significance for its reflection of the settlement, focal point and community development within the Jamberoo Valley area. St. Stephen's is associated with prominent local figures and constitutes significant milestones and consolidations in the growth of their communities. St. Stephen's is of architectural significance with its Norman-derived detailing and of landmark significance to the township of Jamberoo.

St Stephen's Presbyterian Church was listed on the New South Wales State Heritage Register on 2 April 1999 having satisfied the following criteria.

The place is important in demonstrating the course, or pattern, of cultural or natural history in New South Wales.

St Stephen's is an important reflection of the settlement, focal point and community development within the Jamberoo Valley area.

The place has a strong or special association with a person, or group of persons, of importance of cultural or natural history of New South Wales's history.

St. Stephen's is associated with prominent local figures and constitutes significant milestones and consolidations in the growth of their communities.

The place is important in demonstrating aesthetic characteristics and/or a high degree of creative or technical achievement in New South Wales.

St. Stephen's is of architectural significance with its Norman-derived detailing and of landmark significance to the township of Jamberoo.

== See also ==
- List of former churches in Australia
