= Jamberoo =

- Town
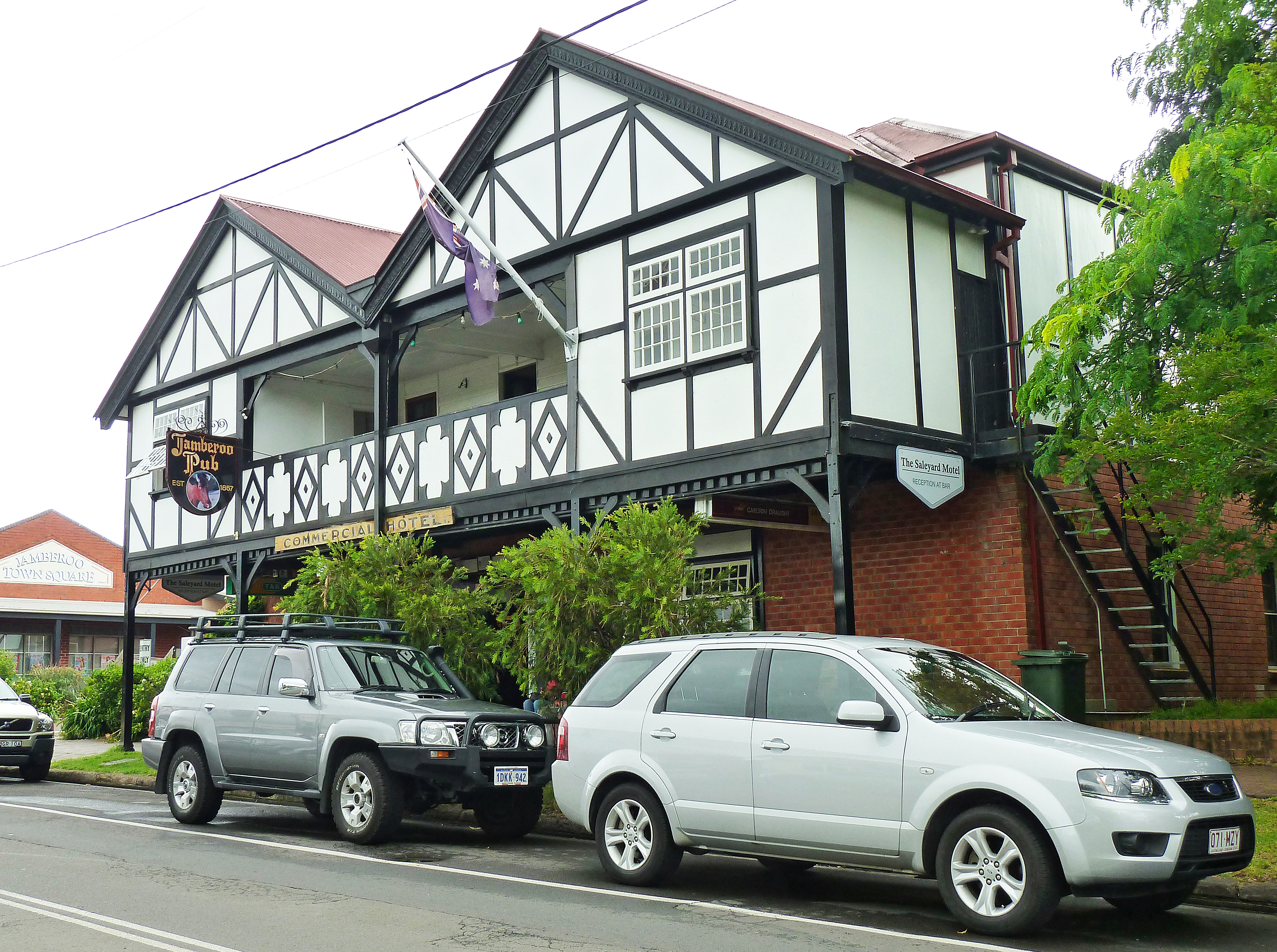
- Jamberoo Hotel, pictured in 2012

- Coordinates: 34°39′S 150°47′E
- Country: Australia
- State: New South Wales
- LGA: Municipality of Kiama
- Location: 114 km (71 mi) from Sydney; 32 km (20 mi) from Wollongong; 11 km (6.8 mi) from Kiama
- Established: 1833 – as Woodstock

Government
  - State electorate: Kiama
  - Federal division: Gilmore
- Elevation: 24 m (79 ft)

Population
  - Total: 1,910 (2021 census)
- Postcode: 2533
- County: Camden
- Parish: Kiama

Jamberoo is a village on the South Coast of New South Wales, Australia in the Municipality of Kiama. It is approximately 11.3 km inland from Kiama. At the 2021 census, Jamberoo had a population of 1,910. The town's name is derived from an Aboriginal word meaning 'track'.

It is well known for the Jamberoo Action Park, Jamberoo Hotel, a pub, and the local dairy-farming community. The Australian Illawarra Shorthorn cattle breed originated in the area. Jamberoo is the birthplace of politician Joseph Cullen.

A Catholic monastery, Jamberoo Abbey, is located 3 km (1.9 mi) south of the village.

== History ==
European history in the valley began in the early 19th century when the cedar-cutters moved through the rainforests gathering this valuable timber. Pioneer settlers followed in the early 1820s with William Davis receiving the first land grant in 1821, followed by John Ritchie and John Cullen shortly afterwards.

Michael Hyam was a property owner by the late 1830s and he laid out the private village of Jamberoo in 1841. The Main South Coast Road formed the northern boundary of his village and at the western end of the town he gave out lots for Protestant Churches. The Presbyterian church of St Stephen stands on the original lot. The Methodist church around the corner in Wyalla St is now the Uniting Church and still hosts services, while the land given to the Church of England, now Anglican Church of Australia has been sold off and the Anglican Church is located north of Hyams Creek on Tates Hill. The old Presbyterian, Anglican and Uniting cemeteries are still located on the original lots, although they have been closed to burials since at least the 1920s.

A sign outside the only fuel station in Jamberoo proclaims the town as the birthplace of co-operative dairy production in Australia. The first co-operative butter factory in Australia was begun at Jamberoo in 1884 adjacent to the old Main South Coast Road (now Jamberoo Road), 2 km from the Princes Highway and just west of Spring Creek and the monument marking the old toll gate. The location is better described as Kiama. An obelisk marks the spot.

In time, there were other butter factories: Woodstock and Wauchope which became the main factory in Factory Lane to the east of the town.

== Heritage listings ==
Jamberoo has a number of heritage-listed sites, including:

- 2 Allowrie Street: St Stephen's Presbyterian Church
- 2 km east of Jamberoo Main Road: Culwalla Homestead

== Geography ==
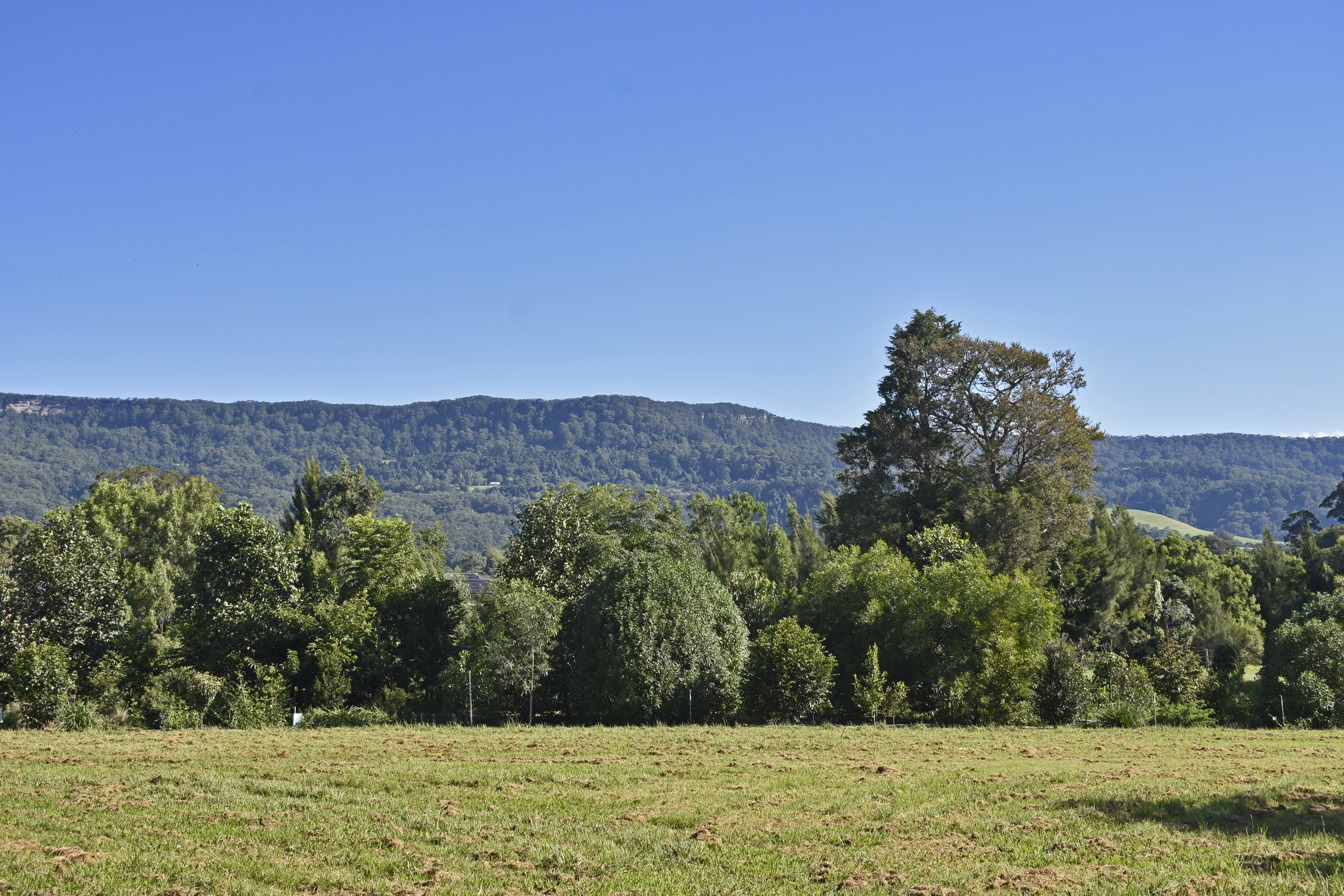
Jamberoo Park

Jamberoo sits at the western end of Terragong Swamp, known locally as The Swamp. The Minnamurra River flows from Minnamurra Falls along the northern side of the swamp. Just east of the old butter factory on Factory Lane the river enters a man-made channel that keeps the river flowing on the northern side of the swamp; the original channel meandered through the broad eastern end of the swamp before crossing Swamp Road and running along the south side of the swamp. In times of high tide and high rainfall, the river resumes its old course closing Swamp Road.

The valley of Jamberoo and the Minnamurra River is steep-sided and reasonably narrow. As a result, the town and valley is not subject to the extremes of weather that nearby Albion Park is. This is a significant observation because the climate data for the district is recorded at Albion Park. Local research (unverified) from Jamberoo weather stations suggests that wind speeds in Jamberoo are approximately half that experienced at Albion Park, while rainfall varies significantly depending on the altitude and proximity to the steep valley sides. Air temperature is not as extreme as recorded for Albion Park.

== Governance ==
Jamberoo was declared a municipality on 21 November 1890. The butcher's shop in Allowrie Street is the former Council Chamber while the bridge over Hyams Creek that joins the northern and southern sides of the village was opened in 1937 by Mrs Fredericks, Mayor of Jamberoo. Jamberoo is a part of the Municipality of Kiama, State seat of Kiama and Federal seat of Gilmore which, apart from Jamberoo, consists mostly of the metropolitan area of southern Wollongong and Shellharbour.

== Demographics ==
In the 2021 Census, there were 1,910 people in Jamberoo. 82.6% of people were born in Australia and 91.9% of people spoke only English at home. The most common responses for religion were No Religion 40.1%, Catholic 22.3% and Anglican 19.6%.

Historical population
Year	Pop.	±%
1921	1,059	—
1933	1,095	+3.4%
1947	921	−15.9%
1954	892	−3.1%
1961		—
1966		—
1971	326	—
1976	361	+10.7%
1981	462	+28.0%
1986	482	+4.3%
1991	704	+46.1%
1996	883	+25.4%
2001	932	+5.5%
2006	935	+0.3%
2011	905	−3.2%
2016	971	+7.3%
2021	1,229	+26.6%
Source: Australian Bureau of Statistics data.

== Education ==
Education in Jamberoo was first provided by the Church of England (now Anglican) on the site of the original grant of land from Michael Hyam. School commenced early in 1842 in a building partly funded by private subscription and government money. After a school teacher left in August 1873, there was talk of converting the school house into a Public School however this did not occur and it reopened in March 1874 with 40 students.

The Public School came into operation in January 1878 which led to the closure of the denominational schools.

== Sport ==
The Jamberoo Superoos rugby league team compete in the Group 7 Rugby League competition, in which they are a founding club and have won 12 titles.

== Notable people ==
- John Thomas (Tom) Cole (1854–1927); a dairy farmer and stud-breeder who played a leading role in the dairy industry and was involved in local politics.
- Henrietta Anne Huxley (née Heathorn) wife of Thomas Henry Huxley, famously known as "Darwin's Bulldog" for his advocacy of Charles Darwin's theory of evolution; mother of Marian Collier (painter) and Leonard Huxley (writer); grandmother of Julian Huxley, first Director of UNESCO, Aldous Huxley author of Brave New World and Nobel prize winning physician Andrew Huxley.
