= Culwalla Homestead =

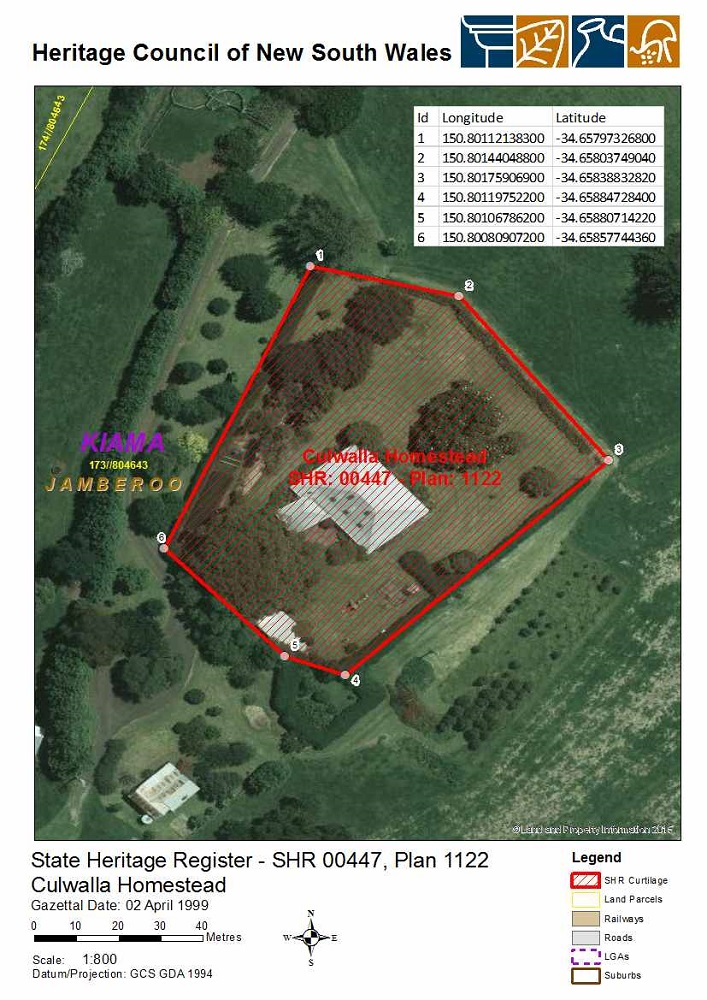
- Heritage boundaries

- Location within New South Wales Location within Australia
- 34.6586°S 150.8011°E
- Location: 2km east of Jamberoo Main Road, Jamberoo, Municipality of Kiama, New South Wales, Australia

History
- Built: 1858–1858

New South Wales Heritage Register
- Official name: Culwalla Homestead
- Type: state heritage (built)
- Designated: 2 April 1999
- Reference no.: 447
- Type: Homestead building
- Category: Residential buildings (private)
- Builders: James Marks

Culwalla Homestead is a heritage-listed former dairy farm and now residence located 2 km east of Jamberoo Main Road, Jamberoo, in the Illawarra region of New South Wales, Australia. It was built in 1858 by James Marks. It was added to the New South Wales State Heritage Register on 2 April 1999.

== History ==
Culwalla was constructed in 1858 by James Marks, whose brother built nearby Terragong House at the same time. James and his brother were sons of an early settler of the district, James Marks, who built Kiama's second inn, the Steam Packet in 1842. Both were sons of James Marks who had a licence for Kiama's second inn, the Steam Packet in 1842. Both married daughters of William Moffitt, a Pitt Street bookseller and stationer.

Terragong House stands on land granted to Malcolm Campbell, an overseer of convicts at Coolangatta (Illawarra) in 1830. He built a brick cottage and place a Mr. Black in charge and went to live in Sydney where he died in 1837. There were two claimants for his estate, James Marks and Ewen Campbell, and finally the 500 acres were divided between the two men.

In 1985 the owners who were in the process of subdividing and selling Culwalla nominated it for a Permanent Conservation Order to facilitate restoration and maintenance of the house, which was completed during the late 1980s.

On 2 April 1999 Culwalla was transferred to the State Heritage Register.

== Description ==
Culwalla occupies a magnificent site above Jamberoo Valley and is a prominent landmark in the district. To the north of the building there are the remains of an extensive garden now confined to some mature trees and shrubs. To the south, west and east there are grassed areas with a detached timber garage and laundry at some distance to the south, a thicket of shrubs forming a screen to the east and the remains of rainwater tanks and their supports close to the ground at the corners of the main building.

Homestead

A fine late Georgian house which is one of the earliest remaining buildings in the Kiama district. It is relatively intact. The building is of vernacular colonial Georgian design, the detailing suggesting the middle Victorian period. Walls are of local freestock basalt rubble construction, stuccoed externally and marked out to represent ashlar work and plastered and set internally. Most joinery is of a fine quality and of polished native cedar while the hipped roof retains its original split shingling under later corrugated iron sheeting. A detailed schedule of finishes is included in the appendices. There are some minor brick additions to the old kitchen wing while all chimneys are of sandstock brickwork.

The single storey house is symmetrical with front and rear timber verandahs and an attached kitchen wing at one side. The brocken hipped roof retains its timber shingles under corrugated iron while flooring is of wide pine boards, the ceiling painted boarding with plaster cornice. Internally the house is in excellent condition while externally it is generally good apart from some verandah flooring and a corner damaged by earth temors. Bought late in the 19th century by the Spinks family, its name was given to Culwalla Chambers, Sydney's first "skyscraper" built in 1912.

A symmetrical layout of the main wing provides for three rooms either side of a central corridor, a front timber verandah to three sides and a rear concrete floored verandah terminated at teach end by box rooms, one being larger than the other. To the rear on the West side is the attached Kitchen wing having its own hipped roof and verandah now enclosed into a room and corridor, presumably being a later Pantry annex. The building is of one storey only.

The timber verandah has tapered posts, simple classical inspired capitals and scalloped timber valances. The front verandah is reached by a flight of rendered masonry steps having the remains of cast iron bootscrapers on either side. The front and return facades appear to retain their original colour schemes of ochre coloured walls and Venetian red joinery.

The main front rooms have french windows at the sides surmounted by cedar ogee pattern panels above. All reveals of doorways are panelled to correspond with the panelling of the doors. The front door, D1, is 5 panelled, the upper panels now glazed. It appears to be an Edwardian period replacement. Internal doors are 4 panelled with panels at matching levels in the reveals. The doors to the rear verandah are 6 panelled flush beaded type.

Windows are generally 12 pane double hung type but panelled inside to the floor. There are french doors to the side verandahs which have wide architraves reaching to the picture rail line the space below to the head being infilled by a cedar board of ogee pattern. All windows have cedar splayed reveals and most are of the colonial twelve paned pattern. Windows to the two front rooms have cedar panels extending twelve paned pattern. Windows to the two front rooms have cedar panels extending from the sill to the floor.

All chimney pieces are cedar fluted with roundels except one which is white marble. Three chimney pieces have roundels at the corners and fluting with wide simple mantle shelf. The largest front room has a white marble chimney piece with classical console brackets. All fireplaces have elegant cast iron inserts and grates.

All cedar to the main rooms is polished including skirtings and architraves.

=== Modifications and dates ===
These appear confined to the re-roofing of the rear rooms, verandahs and part enclosure of verandahs. The south east box room has been converted into a bathroom dating from about c. 1960. There is evidence to suggest that the box rooms, kitchen wing and verandah at the rear have been partly or completely rebuilt at a time about c. 1900 or later.

== Heritage listing ==
Culwalla is of State significance as a substantial and largely intact Georgian farmhouse which is one of the earliest remaining dwellings in the Kiama area. It is associated with its first owner and early settler James marks and his family and the Spinks family for most of the 20th century period. It is a notable example of traditional vernacular construction techniques displaying fine craftsmanship and the use of local materials such as freestone, native red cedar and hardwood. It occupies a magnificent site above the Jamberoo Valley and is a prominent landmark in the district.

Culwalla Homestead was listed on the New South Wales State Heritage Register on 2 April 1999.
