= Great Sydney Dyke =

Jurassic igneous dyke beneath metropolitan Sydney, Australia

Waverley Cemetery on Sydney's eastern coastline. The easternmost known onshore occurrences of the Great Sydney Dyke are in the coastal cliffs near the cemetery.

The Great Sydney Dyke is a major igneous dyke extending beneath the eastern and central parts of Sydney, New South Wales, Australia. Also historically designated Pittman Dyke LVI, it consists principally of dolerite and basalt intruded through the Triassic sedimentary rocks of the Sydney Basin, particularly the Hawkesbury Sandstone. The dyke extends approximately west-northwest to east-southeast from at least Glebe Island through Pyrmont, Ultimo, Haymarket, Surry Hills and Moore Park towards the coast near Waverley Cemetery. Its known onshore extent is at least 9 kilometres (5.6 mi), with a possible continuation towards Rozelle increasing this to about 10 kilometres (6.2 mi); its eastern termination lies offshore and has not been established.

Potassium–argon dating of plagioclase from the dyke has yielded an age of 163.0 ± 3.3 million years, placing its emplacement in the Middle Jurassic. It is therefore substantially older than the opening of the Tasman Sea and the principal phase of separation between Australia and Zealandia. The dyke has also provided an important chronological marker for determining the age of later faulting in Sydney, as north-northeast-trending faults at Haymarket cut and displace it.

Much of the Great Sydney Dyke is concealed beneath urban development, superficial deposits and reclaimed land, and knowledge of its course has consequently been assembled from historical exposures, boreholes, railway and road excavations, tunnels and other geotechnical investigations. It has particular significance in Sydney's engineering geology because the dolerite commonly weathers deeply to clay and is accompanied by fractured, sheared and locally metamorphosed sandstone. The dyke has therefore been encountered during numerous major infrastructure projects, including railway works, road construction, the Glebe Island Bridge, the Eastern Distributor and more recent tunnelling projects.

== History of investigation ==
Igneous dykes in Sydney were documented during the nineteenth and early twentieth centuries as expanding railway, sewerage, water-supply and road works exposed the underlying Hawkesbury Sandstone. The structure now known as the Great Sydney Dyke was initially represented by several apparently separate occurrences. In 1903, geologist Edward Fisher Pittman recognised that a dyke exposed near Waverley Cemetery could represent the continuation of one identified around Blackwattle Bay and Pyrmont, demonstrating the possibility of a single structure extending for several kilometres across Sydney.

The dyke was subsequently mapped in geological and engineering investigations, including mapping by the Snowy Mountains Hydro-Electric Authority in 1969 and the Sydney 1:100,000 geological mapping undertaken by the Geological Survey of New South Wales. Increasing urban excavation during the twentieth century provided additional exposures and borehole intersections that allowed its position and geometry to be reconstructed in greater detail. The name Great Sydney Dyke appears to have entered engineering usage considerably later than its initial discovery. Dale, Rickwood and Won found no clear evidence for the originator of the name and concluded that it was probably being used informally by engineers by the early 1980s. The name appeared in published geological literature by 1985.

A detailed synthesis of its known occurrences and engineering characteristics was published by Malcolm J. Dale, Peter C. Rickwood and G. W. Won in 1997 as The Geology and Engineering Geology of the 'Great Sydney Dyke', Sydney NSW. Their study combined historical geological observations with information obtained from boreholes, excavations and geotechnical investigations associated with major infrastructure projects.

== Extent and geometry ==
The Great Sydney Dyke follows an overall west-northwest–east-southeast orientation across inner Sydney. Measurements of its strike range approximately from 108° to 130° relative to true north, with most measurements between 111° and 120°. It is not, however, a perfectly straight planar intrusion. Its median plane changes orientation along its course and its margins display irregularities, local offsets, bends and sidesteps. The dyke is generally steeply dipping. Recorded dips include approximately 70° north-northeast near the coast, 80–85° south-southwest at the Sydney Football Stadium, 82° south-southwest near the former Sydney Entertainment Centre, 68–83° north-northeast near William Henry Street at Ultimo, 65–77° north-northeast at Fig Street in Pyrmont, and around 64–78° north-northeast around Glebe Island. Local changes in geometry can produce considerably shallower dips, particularly around sidesteps, where the contacts between the intrusion and surrounding sandstone may curve sharply.

Its width is similarly variable. Measurements range from approximately 1 metre (3.3 ft) to 12 metres (39 ft), although a width of about 5 to 6 metres (16 to 20 ft) is more typical. Some unusually large apparent widths may result from boreholes intersecting bends or sidesteps in the dyke rather than representing a genuine widening of the intrusion. Modern investigations at Darling Harbour have commonly encountered widths of approximately 3 to 8.5 metres (9.8 to 27.9 ft), with local apparent widths approaching 12 metres (39 ft). Small sills, branches and apophyses locally extend from the principal intrusion along joints and bedding surfaces in the surrounding sandstone. A smaller subparallel dyke, approximately 0.3 to 0.5 metres (0.98 to 1.64 ft) wide, was identified adjacent to the main dyke during investigations at Fig Street, Pyrmont.

== Course ==
=== Eastern suburbs ===
The easternmost known onshore occurrences are near the coast at Waverley Cemetery, where two dykes approximately 100 metres (330 ft) apart have historically been mapped. It remains uncertain which represents the principal continuation of the Great Sydney Dyke. The structure is interpreted to continue westward beneath the densely developed eastern suburbs, although continuous surface exposure is absent. Reported occurrences trace the structure through or near Queens Park, Centennial Park and Moore Park. At Centennial Park, its precise position is uncertain because superficial material, vegetation and development conceal the underlying geology. Although Hawkesbury Sandstone crops out elsewhere in the park, Dale, Rickwood and Won found no exposed dyke along its expected alignment.

=== Moore Park and Surry Hills ===
Extensive investigation of the dyke was undertaken around the Sydney Football Stadium and Moore Park during planning and construction projects. Boreholes indicated a dyke approximately 4 to 5 metres (13 to 16 ft) wide in parts of the area. Around Drivers Triangle, the structure lies beneath several metres of Quaternary sand and was found to be deeply weathered, with residual clay and extremely weathered igneous rock extending more than 10 metres (33 ft) below the surface in several boreholes.

Near the former Captain Cook Hotel at the corner of Moore Park Road and Flinders Street, boreholes established that the dyke passed partly beneath the site and was approximately 5 metres (16 ft) wide. Investigations identified residual clay and extremely weathered basalt derived from the intrusion. The dyke continues northwestward beneath Surry Hills. It was encountered during railway and other underground construction and has been mapped beneath the vicinity of Albion Street. During construction associated with the raised section of the City Circle, railway piers were spaced so that the structure could be bridged rather than founded directly upon the deeply weathered dyke material.

The Eastern Distributor tunnels subsequently intersected the Great Sydney Dyke. The dyke encountered by the tunnels was approximately 6 metres (20 ft) wide and ranged from extremely to moderately weathered dolerite.

=== Haymarket and Darling Harbour ===
The dyke crosses the southern portion of the Sydney central business district through Haymarket. It has been encountered around Central station, the former Sydney Entertainment Centre and neighbouring developments. Investigations at the former Entertainment Centre site indicated a locally complex geometry, with the dyke dipping towards the southwest and varying considerably in apparent width.

At Haymarket, the dyke is also intersected and displaced by a younger north-northeast-striking fault. Drill core showed crushing and slickensiding of the dyke associated with this later deformation. This relationship has been used to establish that movement on Sydney's north-northeast-trending fault system occurred after emplacement of the Great Sydney Dyke. Modern investigations around Darling Harbour have continued to encounter the structure. The dyke there commonly consists of extremely weathered dolerite with stiff, clay-like properties overlying more competent highly weathered to fresh dolerite. Fresh or less-weathered rock may occur at considerable depth.

=== Ultimo and Pyrmont ===
West of Haymarket, the Great Sydney Dyke crosses Ultimo and Pyrmont. Numerous excavations and boreholes have provided detailed information about its geometry in this area. It has been recorded around William Henry Street, Harris Street and Fig Street. At Fig Street, investigations for road construction revealed both the principal dyke and a smaller subparallel intrusion. The main dyke displays a sidestep towards the south-southwest, illustrating the locally irregular geometry of the structure. Sandstone immediately adjacent to the intrusion is variably jointed, fractured and thermally altered.

=== Glebe Island and Rozelle ===
The westernmost well-established continuation crosses the Glebe Island area. The dyke was encountered during works associated with the Glebe Island Bridge, where drilling and excavation demonstrated that it was composed of bands displaying markedly different degrees of weathering, from clay and extremely weathered basalt to moderately weathered igneous rock.

Exposures of the dyke in railway cuttings around the former Glebe Island grain-handling facilities have been regarded as among the best surviving surface exposures of an igneous dyke in metropolitan Sydney. The surviving Glebe Island Dyke Exposures are included on the Port Authority of New South Wales heritage register because of their geological and educational significance and their rarity as accessible above-ground exposures of the Great Sydney Dyke. A possible continuation has been inferred towards Rozelle, including from the alignment of a topographic depression near Evans Street. If this represents the dyke, its onshore length would approach 10 kilometres (6.2 mi). Its continuation farther northwest has not been established.

== Petrology and emplacement ==
The Great Sydney Dyke is a mafic intrusion composed predominantly of dolerite or basaltic rock. It intruded the pre-existing sedimentary succession of the Sydney Basin, particularly the quartz-rich Hawkesbury Sandstone. At depth, relatively fresh dyke rock is generally dark and considerably stronger than the intensely weathered material commonly encountered closer to the surface.

Intrusion of hot magma altered the sandstone immediately adjoining the dyke. Contact metamorphism generally produced harder, higher-strength sandstone within a relatively narrow zone along its margins, although the degree of alteration varies considerably between sites. Modern investigations at Darling Harbour have identified slightly metamorphosed, high-strength sandstone approximately 1 to 2 metres (3.3 to 6.6 ft) from the dyke contact. Other effects include bleaching and recrystallisation of sandstone and the development of jointing, shearing and fracturing along the contact. In places the magma penetrated existing joints or bedding planes to produce small branches and sill-like protrusions.

== Age ==
Potassium–argon dating of plagioclase from the Great Sydney Dyke produced an age of 163.0 ± 3.3 million years, placing its emplacement in the Middle Jurassic. The date makes the structure one of Sydney's older recognised Mesozoic igneous intrusions. The age is also important in reconstructing the tectonic history of the Sydney region. At Haymarket, a north-northeast-striking fault cuts and displaces the west-northwest-striking dyke by several metres. Because the fault deformation must postdate the approximately 163-million-year-old intrusion, the Great Sydney Dyke provides a maximum age for at least part of the later faulting affecting the Sydney Basin.

Potassium–argon studies of minerals within fault gouge elsewhere in the regional fault system indicate that substantial brittle deformation had occurred before an approximately 120-million-year-old Early Cretaceous thermal event. Together, these relationships indicate a complex post-Triassic tectonic history involving Jurassic magmatism followed by younger faulting and thermal activity.

== Weathering ==
One of the most important characteristics of the Great Sydney Dyke from an engineering perspective is its extreme degree of weathering. Near the surface, the original igneous rock may be almost completely altered to residual clay, producing material with physical properties very different from both fresh dolerite and the adjoining Hawkesbury Sandstone. Investigations at Darling Harbour found that the dyke may be weathered to clay to depths exceeding 30 metres (98 ft). The weathered profile can include stiff clay-like material and extremely to highly weathered dolerite before transitioning into stronger, less-weathered rock at depth. At individual sites, the depth and degree of weathering vary considerably, reflecting the geometry of the dyke, groundwater conditions and local weathering history.

The difference between the weathered dyke and surrounding sandstone can be substantial. Hawkesbury Sandstone may remain competent close to a zone in which the dyke has been transformed into clay, while the immediate contact may contain fractured, sheared or thermally hardened sandstone.

== Hydrogeology ==
The Great Sydney Dyke also influences local hydrogeology. Weathered dykes in the Sydney region can behave as barriers to groundwater movement across their strike, while fracturing produced during intrusion may create zones of relatively greater permeability parallel to the dyke. A borehole drilled at Rozelle specifically to intersect the Great Sydney Dyke encountered moderately to highly weathered dolerite between approximately 92.5 and 95.15 metres (303.5 and 312.2 ft) below ground level. The surrounding sandstone displayed increased jointing and shearing associated with the intrusion, and the lower sandstone contact was extremely weathered. Consequently, groundwater behaviour around the dyke can differ from that in relatively intact Hawkesbury Sandstone. Its engineering effect depends upon the degree of weathering, continuity of clay-rich material and the development and connectivity of fractures around its margins.

== Engineering significance ==
The Great Sydney Dyke is one of the most extensively investigated geological structures encountered in civil engineering works in central Sydney. Its engineering significance results primarily from the sharp contrast between relatively competent Hawkesbury Sandstone and the deeply weathered, clay-rich material that may occupy the dyke, together with jointing, shearing and variable rock strength around its contacts.

The structure has affected the planning or construction of numerous projects, including railway infrastructure near Central station, the Sydney Football Stadium, road works at Fig Street in Pyrmont, the Glebe Island Bridge and the Eastern Distributor tunnels. At some historical sites, structures were designed to bridge the dyke or avoid founding directly on its weathered material. For deep excavations and tunnels, accurately establishing the location, width, dip and degree of weathering of the dyke can therefore be important. Its irregular geometry complicates prediction from surface mapping alone: local sidesteps, changes in dip and subsidiary intrusions can cause the dyke to occur away from a simple projection of its regional strike.

At the former Sydney Entertainment Centre and surrounding Darling Harbour redevelopment area, detailed investigations found the dyke to range generally between approximately 3 and 8.5 metres (9.8 and 27.9 ft) wide, although apparent widths of up to 12 metres (39 ft) were recorded. Sandstone within approximately 1 to 2 metres (3.3 to 6.6 ft) of the intrusion showed evidence of thermal alteration, while shearing, jointing, fracturing and possible faulting were present around the contact. The Great Sydney Dyke remains relevant to contemporary infrastructure projects. Investigations for Sydney Metro West identified the possibility of encountering it near tunnelling and construction works between The Bays and the Sydney central business district.

== Relationship with faults ==
The Great Sydney Dyke should not be confused with a fault. It is an igneous intrusion formed when magma entered a fracture within the Sydney Basin rocks and subsequently solidified. It nevertheless interacts with several younger structural features. Sydney contains a prominent set of approximately north-northeast-striking fault and fracture zones, which cross the west-northwest-striking dyke at a high angle. At Haymarket, one such structure has displaced the Great Sydney Dyke by several metres and produced crushing and slickensiding of the dyke rock. This cross-cutting relationship is geologically significant because it demonstrates that movement on the north-northeast-trending structure occurred after the dyke crystallised approximately 163 million years ago. The relationship was subsequently used together with isotopic dating of fault gouges to constrain the chronology of brittle deformation across the Sydney region.

== Glebe Island exposures ==
The surviving exposures at Glebe Island provide an uncommon opportunity to observe the Great Sydney Dyke above ground. Much of the structure elsewhere is concealed beneath buildings, roads, fill or superficial sediments and is known principally from subsurface engineering investigations. The Glebe Island exposures show the intrusive relationship between the dyke and the surrounding Hawkesbury Sandstone and demonstrate the variable weathering of the igneous material. One exposure in a railway cutting was described by Dale, Rickwood and Won as possibly the best exposed dyke in metropolitan Sydney. The exposures have subsequently been recognised for their heritage value. The Port Authority of New South Wales identifies them as a significant geological formation with importance for the historical development of Sydney and for the education of geology and engineering students. Their rarity is enhanced by the loss or concealment of many other former exposures as Sydney has developed.

== See also ==
- Geology of New South Wales
- Sydney Basin
- Hawkesbury Sandstone
- Igneous intrusion
- Fairfield Basin
- Homebush Bay Fault Zone
