= Homebush Bay Fault Zone =

Geological fault zone beneath metropolitan Sydney, Australia

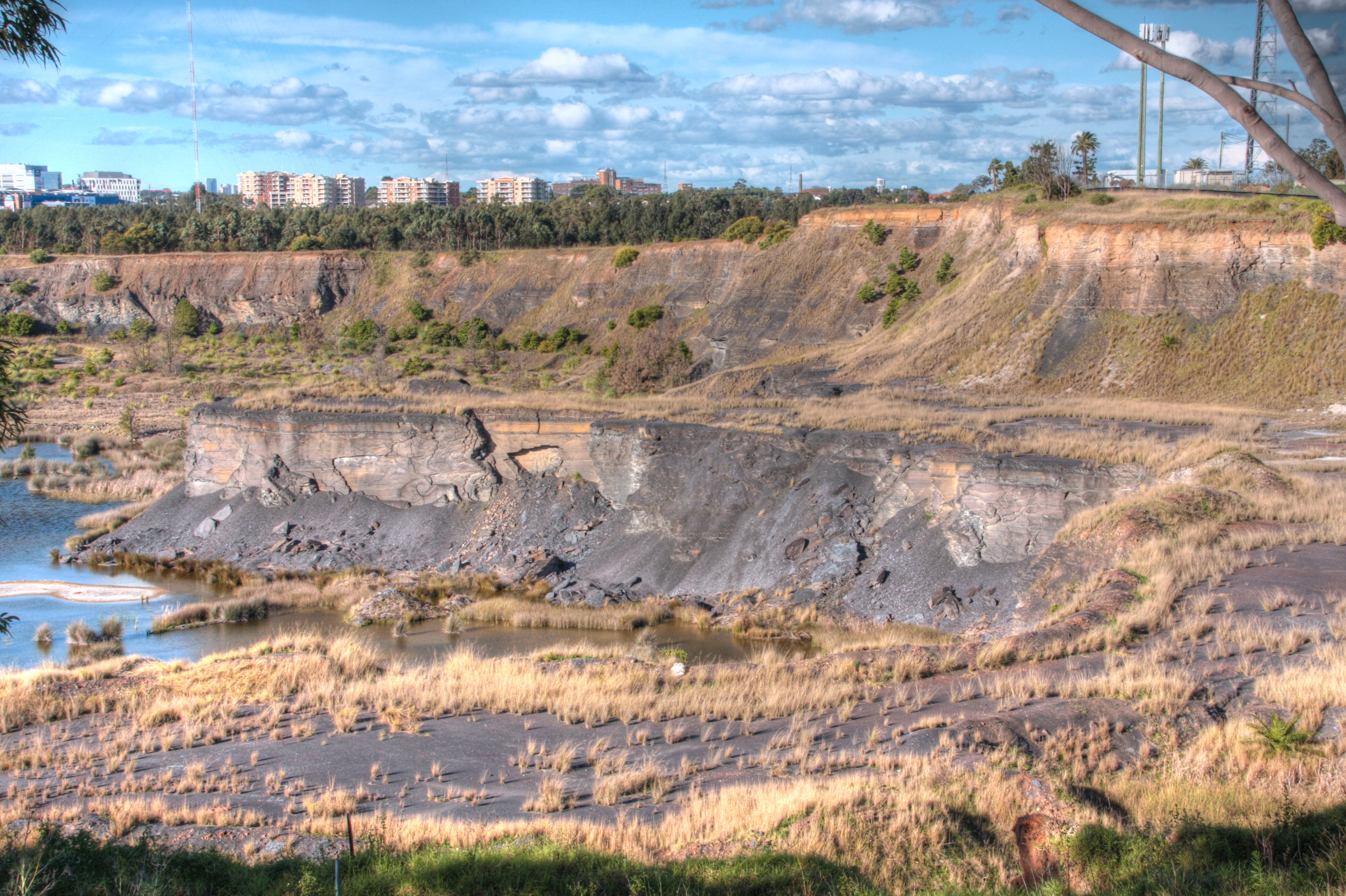
- The former Homebush Bay Brick Pit at Sydney Olympic Park, exposing rocks of the local Sydney Basin sequence.
- Etymology: Homebush Bay
- Country: Australia
- Region: Sydney, New South Wales
- State: New South Wales
- Cities: Bankstown, Rhodes, Ryde, Macquarie Park

Characteristics
- Part of: Sydney Basin
- Length: At least 20 km (12 mi)
- Strike: NNE–SSW

Tectonics
- Plate: Australian Plate
- Type: Strike-slip fault
- Movement: Sinistral
- Rock units: Narrabeen Group, Hawkesbury Sandstone, Wianamatta Group
- Age: Early Cretaceous 140–130 Ma

The Homebush Bay Fault Zone is a major fault zone in the Sydney Basin of New South Wales, Australia. It is one of several major north-northeast-striking fault zones identified beneath the Sydney metropolitan region. The fault zone has been encountered at locations including Bankstown, Rhodes, Top Ryde and Macquarie Park, giving it a known strike length of at least 20 kilometres (12 mi) .The zone occurs principally within the Triassic sedimentary rocks of the Sydney Basin and is expressed as zones of fractured, jointed and locally brecciated rock.

Although the zone is named after Homebush Bay, evidence of the structure has been identified over a considerably greater distance across western and northern Sydney. Other major structures identified in the same system include the Luna Park Fault Zone, Woolloomooloo Fault Zone and Watsons Bay Fault Zone, together with the less-developed Heathcote Road Fault Zone and numerous smaller fault and fracture zones. The structures cut the largely flat-lying Triassic sedimentary succession of the Sydney region, including rocks of the Narrabeen Group, Hawkesbury Sandstone and Wianamatta Group.

== Geology ==
The major north-northeast-trending fault zones are generally steeply dipping to near-vertical and are expressed as joint swarms, sheared joints and zones of highly fractured or brecciated rock containing fault gouge. Disturbed zones associated with the major faults can reach approximately 3 metres (9.8 ft) in width, while individual zones of fault gouge can reach approximately 2 metres (6.6 ft) in width. Numerous smaller fracture zones occur between the major faults, and historical tunnel records have identified fracture zones corresponding with parts of the mapped fault system. The precise geometry and continuity of the fault zones are difficult to determine because bedrock exposure is limited across much of metropolitan Sydney, particularly in heavily developed areas. The major faults nevertheless appear to correspond with several prominent north-northeast-trending valleys and bays, suggesting that zones of fractured and weakened rock have influenced local geomorphology. Much of their extent has consequently been reconstructed from a combination of natural exposures, road cuttings, excavations, boreholes and underground engineering works.

At Rhodes, the Homebush Bay Fault Zone has been directly observed in exposed rock. A separate thrust fault has also been documented at Meadowbank, immediately west of the Homebush Bay Fault Zone. Geotechnical investigations around Homebush Bay and Concord West have encountered weathered and variably strong shale, including faulting interpreted as potentially associated with the Homebush Bay Fault Zone. Subsurface investigations have provided further evidence of the structure beneath the Homebush Bay area. The Rouse Hill Siltstone Member of the Ashfield Shale contains a distinctive fine-grained layer that has been used as a stratigraphic marker to compare its elevation between boreholes. Analysis of borehole cores between Westmead and North Strathfield identified a horst-and-graben structure through Homebush Bay associated with the Homebush Bay Fault Zone, with a maximum interpreted oblique strike-slip displacement of approximately 25 metres (82 ft).

Investigations for Sydney Metro West have placed the proposed Sydney Olympic Park station on the periphery of the Homebush Bay Fault Zone. Possible faults in the vicinity have been interpreted as joint swarms. Hydrogeological investigations found no evidence that the surrounding shale was generally highly permeable, although hydraulic conductivity may be locally greater where faults, joint swarms or other water-bearing fractures occur. Further north, geotechnical investigations at Macquarie Park identify the Homebush Bay Fault Zone as running approximately north-northeast along Lane Cove Road, east of the investigated site. The surrounding rocks may be more intensely fractured and can contain zones of weaker and more variable rock.

== Movement and age ==
The precise direction and sense of movement along the north-northeast-trending faults of the Sydney region are difficult to determine because features recording the direction of movement, such as slickenlines, are generally absent. Where such evidence is preserved, it indicates predominantly strike-slip movement, accompanied locally by a smaller dip-slip component. Displaced bedding observed in some excavations and road cuttings indicates that the latter included normal fault movement. At Centro Bankstown, structural evidence from the Homebush Bay Fault Zone indicates sinistral (left-lateral) strike-slip movement, in contrast to dextral movement identified on parts of the Luna Park Fault Zone. The age of faulting has been investigated using potassium–argon dating of illite and mixed-layer illite–smectite extracted from fault gouge and surrounding host rocks. Ages obtained from different mineral-size fractions ranged from approximately 159.5 ± 3.2 to 106.6 ± 2.1 million years. The finest fractions extracted from fault gouges, which are less affected by contamination from older detrital minerals, produced ages ranging from 138 ± 4.4 to 106.5 ± 2.1 million years, with a mean age of approximately 121 million years.

These dates are not interpreted as directly representing the age of fault movement. Similar ages obtained from the surrounding host rocks indicate that the potassium–argon isotopic system was subsequently reset by a regional thermal event at approximately 120 million years ago. Mineralogical evidence indicates that fluids circulated through the fault zones during this event, with the fractured and brecciated rocks providing pathways for increased fluid–rock interaction. The thermal event has been attributed to subsurface felsic magmatism associated with the early stages of rifting and breakup of eastern Gondwana. Field relationships provide additional constraints on the history of the north-northeast-trending fault system. At Haymarket, a fault of the same regional orientation displaces the Great Sydney Dyke, which has been dated to approximately 163 million years

== Engineering significance ==
Although the Homebush Bay Fault Zone represents ancient geological deformation, it remains relevant to geotechnical investigations because faulted rock can be substantially more fractured and variable in strength than surrounding intact bedrock. Within and adjacent to the fault zone, engineering investigations may encounter closely spaced joints, joint swarms, brecciated or sheared rock, fault gouge and zones of weaker or more highly weathered material. Such variations can influence assessments of rock strength, excavation conditions and foundation design. Geotechnical investigations along the inferred course of the fault therefore consider the location and condition of faulted rock rather than treating the structure as a uniform or sharply defined geological boundary. At Macquarie Park, investigations associated with the MPark Talavera Road Data Centre identified the Homebush Bay Fault Zone as extending approximately north-northeast along Lane Cove Road, east of the investigated site. The study noted that rock surrounding the fault could be more fractured and contain zones of weaker and more variable rock than the surrounding bedrock.

Faulting may also influence local hydrogeology by providing pathways for groundwater through otherwise relatively low-permeability rock. Hydrogeological investigations for the Sydney Metro West station at Sydney Olympic Park placed the station on the periphery of the Homebush Bay Fault Zone, with possible faults in the vicinity represented by joint swarms. The surrounding shale was not found to be generally highly permeable, but hydraulic conductivity may be locally increased where faulting, joint swarms or other water-bearing fractures provide interconnected pathways for groundwater. At Concord West, borehole investigations have also encountered faulting in shale interpreted as potentially associated with the Homebush Bay Fault Zone. The occurrence illustrates the importance of site-specific subsurface investigation along the inferred fault zone, as its expression can vary between highly fractured or faulted rock and less disturbed surrounding bedrock.

== See also ==
- Sydney Basin
- Geology of New South Wales
- Hawkesbury Sandstone
- Wianamatta Group
- Great Sydney Dyke
