= Sydney sandstone =

Medium to coarse-grained quartz sandstone with minor shale and laminite lenses

Hawkesbury Sandstone
- Stratigraphic range: Middle Triassic (Anisian) 247–241.464 Ma
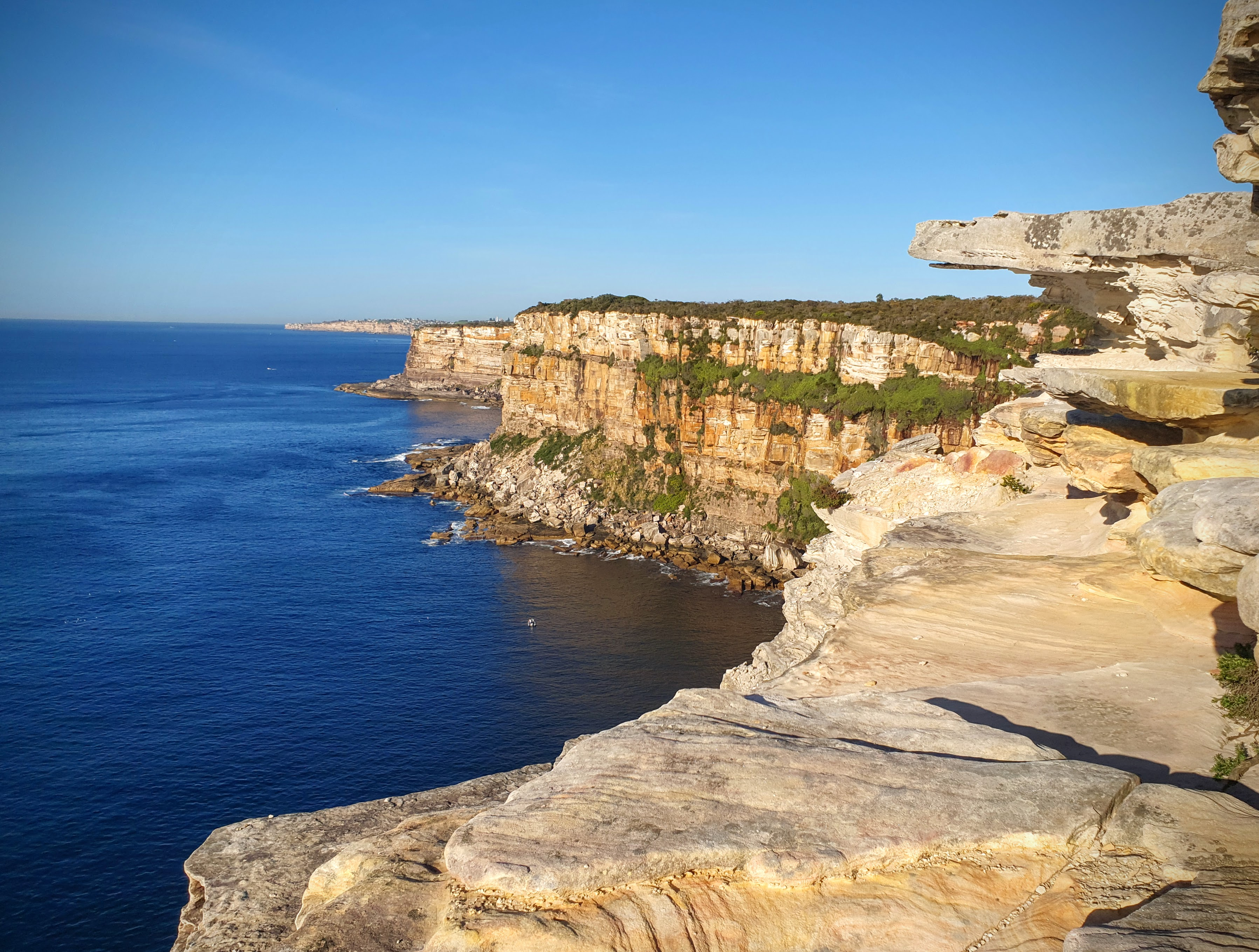
- Sandstone cliffs, Sydney Heads
- Type: Geological formation
- Underlies: Wianamatta Group (Ashfield Shale, Bringelly Shale)
- Overlies: Terrigal Formation, Narrabeen Group, Newport Formation
- Thickness: up to 290 metres

Lithology
- Primary: Sandstone
- Other: Shale

Location
- Location: Sydney, Hunter Valley, Southern Highlands
- Coordinates: 33°45′15″S 151°15′50″E
- Country: Australia
- Extent: Sydney Basin Sydney sandstone (Australia) Sydney sandstone (New South Wales)

Sydney sandstone, also known as the Hawkesbury sandstone, yellowblock, and yellow gold, is a sedimentary rock named after Sydney, and the Hawkesbury River north of Sydney, where this sandstone is particularly common. Sydney sandstone was deposited in the Triassic Period probably in a freshwater delta and is the caprock which controls the erosion and scarp retreat of the Illawarra escarpment.

The Hawkesbury sandstone forms the bedrock for much of the region of Sydney, New South Wales, Australia. Well known for its durable quality, it is the reason many Aboriginal rock carvings and drawings in the area still exist. As a highly favoured building material, especially preferred during the city's early years—from the late 1790s to the 1890s—its use, particularly in public buildings, gives the city its distinctive appearance. The sandstone has traditionally been interpreted as the product of a large braided river system, comparable in scale and depositional style to the modern Brahmaputra River in Bangladesh.

The sandstone is notable for its geological characteristics; its relationship to Sydney's vegetation and topography; the history of the quarries that worked it; and the quality of the buildings and sculptures constructed from it. This bedrock gives the city some of its "personality" by dint of its meteorological, horticultural, aesthetic and historical impact. One author describes Sydney's sandstone as "a kind of base note, an ever-present reminder of its Georgian beginnings and more ancient past." Sandstone escarpments box in the Sydney area on three sides: to the west the Blue Mountains, and to the north and south, the Hornsby Plateau and Woronora Plateau. These escarpments kept Sydney in its bounds and some people still regard the spatial boundaries of the city in these terms.

The formation also hosts a variety of fossil taxa, including fishes, the temnospondyl Subcyclotosaurus, insects, the xiphosuran Austrolimulus, bivalves, various plant species and more.

== Geology ==
=== Description ===
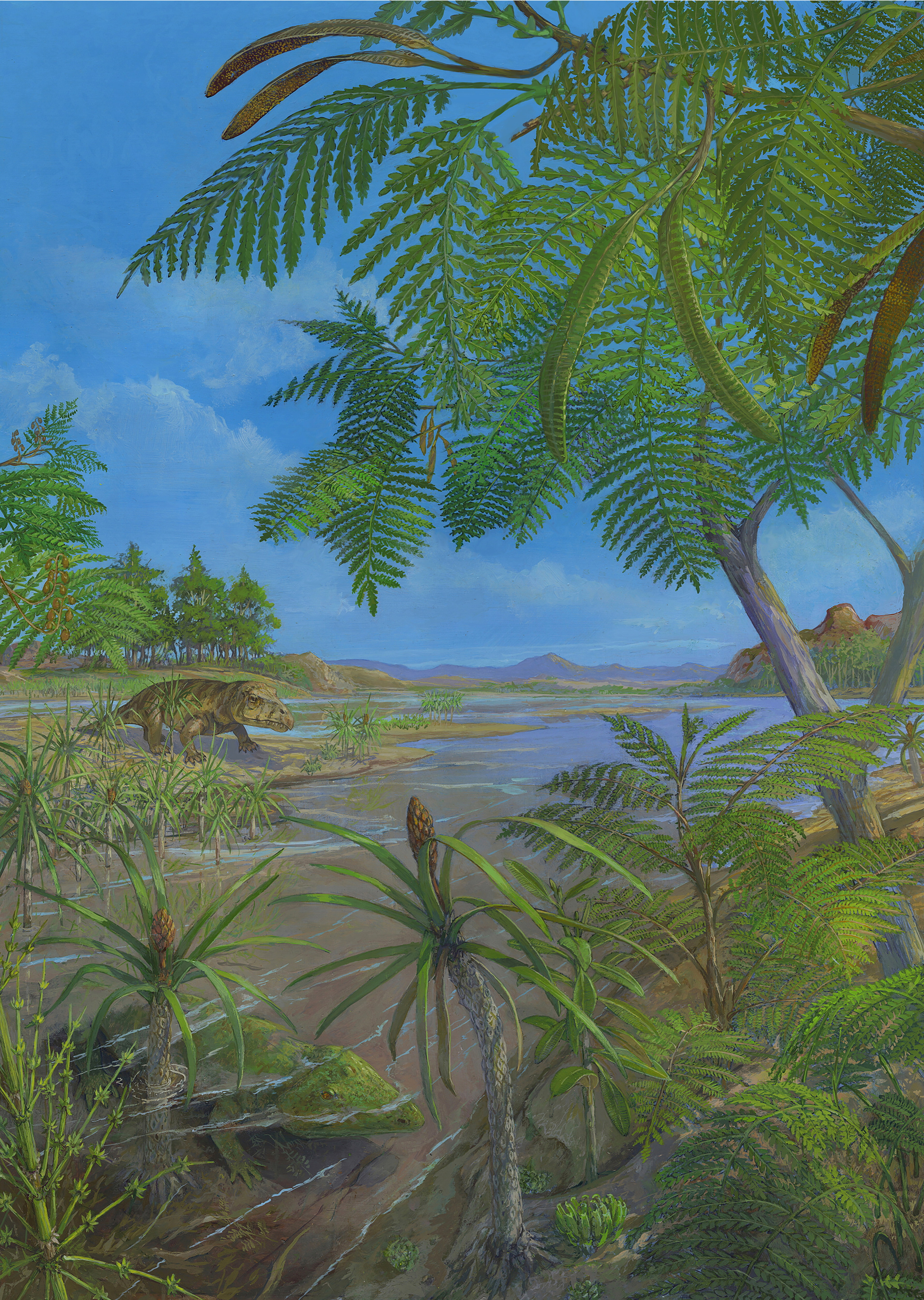
A paleoenvironmental (early Triassic) reconstruction of northern Sydney

The Hawkesbury Sandstone is a Triassic sheet sandstone widely exposed across the Sydney Basin, especially along the coastal areas near Sydney. The ripple marks from the ancient river that brought the grains of sand are distinctive and easily seen, telling geologists that the sand comes from rocks formed between 500 and 700 million years ago far to the south. This means that the highest part of the visible lines almost always faces approximately south. It is a very porous stone and acts as a giant filter. It is composed of very pure silica grains and a small amount of the iron mineral siderite in varying proportions, bound with a clay matrix. It oxidises to the warm yellow-brown colour that is notable in the buildings which are constructed of it.

Photomosaics were constructed for two cliff sections south of Sydney, one extending 5.6 kilometres (3.5 mi) in length. Based on these profiles, characteristic channel-scale architectural elements are estimated to be at least 2.7 kilometres (1.7 mi) wide, with individual macroforms 5–10 metres (16–33 ft) high, indicating the constructional depth of typical channels. Hollow elements (scoop-shaped units interpreted to have formed at channel confluences) reach depths of up to 20 metres (66 ft). Although these dimensions are large, they are measurably smaller than those of channels and bars in the modern Brahmaputra River of Bangladesh. 6 kilometres (3.7 mi) of sandstone and shale lie under Sydney. Sedimentation is interpreted to have been influenced by strong currents operating in shallow marine, littoral, estuarine, fluvial, lacustrine, and aeolian settings.

Crushing strengths and fire resistance tests carried out on Sydney sandstone showed that the compressive strength was 2.57 tons per square inch, or 39.9 megapascals (MPa). The crushing strength for ashlar masonry and lintels averaged 4,600 pounds per square inch (31.7 MPa). Recent tests have recorded compressive strengths of up to 70 MPa. In fire resistance tests, designed to assess the resistance to collapse of a building in a fire, the sandstone came through better than some of the very hard stones, especially the granites. (The stone was subjected to temperatures approaching 800 degrees Celsius, for 15–30 minutes and plunged into cold water.)

Other types of sandstone found in Sydney include sandstones in the Mittagong formation, Newport Formation Sandstone, Bulgo Sandstone, Minchinbury Sandstone, and other sandstones which occur within other layers of sedimentary rocks; such as sandstones within Ashfield Shale, Bringelly Shale and Garie Formation. Bald Hill Claystone is considered by geologists to be a variety of sandstone. Iron and aluminium oxides are found within laterite, which was formed by the weathering of Hawkesbury sandstone.

=== Formation ===
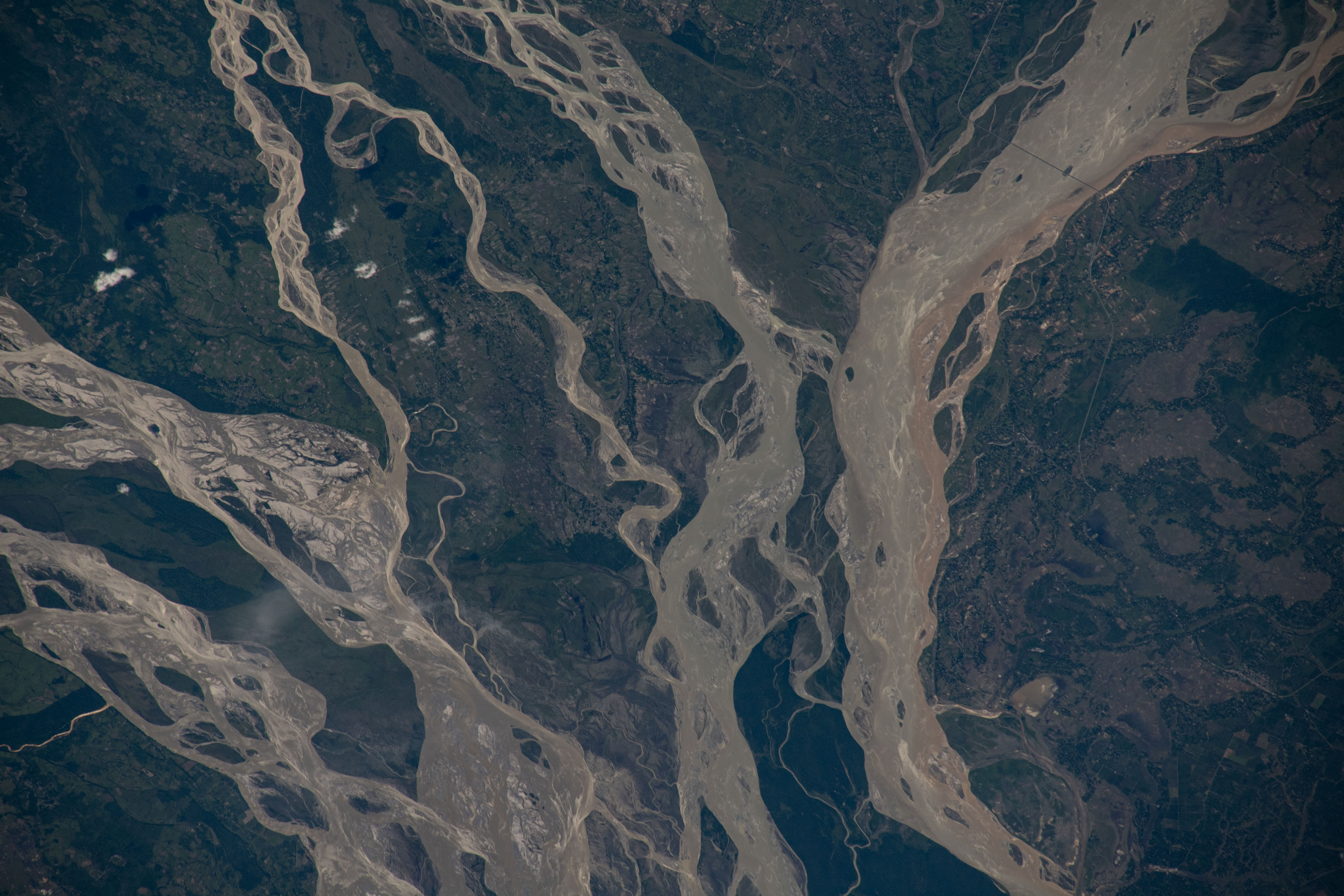
Modern braided river analogues like the Brahmaputra explain the accumulation of thick, widespread sands such as the Sydney Sandstone.

The formation was deposited during the Anisian stage of the Middle Triassic, which spanned approximately 247.2 to 242 million years ago. At that time, Australia and Antarctica were joined as components of the supercontinent Gondwana. From around 280 million years ago, eastern Antarctica began to rise through a major mountain-building episode comparable to the ongoing uplift of the Himalayas. This uplift generated a vast river system that drained northward into the Sydney Basin, transporting and depositing sediments and minerals eroded from Antarctic rocks. Comparable sedimentary patterns can be observed today in river systems fed by the Himalayas. The sand was washed from Broken Hill, and laid down in a bed that is about 200 metres thick. Following burial and lithification, the sandstone underwent gentle folding, fracturing, and faulting, was intruded by basaltic dikes and sills, and was later uplifted—most prominently in the west—forming the Blue Mountains. The Hawkesbury Sandstone is cut by several major fault and fracture systems, including the north-northeast-trending Homebush Bay Fault Zone, which extends for at least 20 kilometres (12 mi) across the Sydney region.

Evidence such as unidirectional paleoflow, freshwater biota, and abundant mudrock intraclasts indicates deposition in a fluvial environment. Its sheet-like geometry, low variability in paleocurrent directions, numerous erosion surfaces, and scarcity of in situ mudrocks further suggest formation within a braided river system, comparable to the modern Brahmaputra River in South Asia. An alternative interpretation proposes a more subdued sediment source and a comparatively arid river system, comparable to the modern Cooper Creek, Warburton, or Diamantina River in the states of Queensland and South Australia. A different view favours a tidally influenced delta, where herringbone cross-bedding records bi-directional flow. The issue remains contentious.

The Narrabeen Group preserves evidence for deposition in a range of environments, including alluvial fans, braided and meandering rivers, and delta plains. A braided river system, characterised by massive floodplain deposits up to 15 metres (49 ft) thick, has been proposed for the massive sandstones. Fluvial modelling by Miall and Jones (2003) further suggests that the Hawkesbury Sandstone comprised channel belts exceeding 2.5 kilometres (1.6 mi) in width. Currents washed through it, leaching out most of the minerals and leaving a very poor rock that made an insipid soil. They washed out channels in some places, while in others, the currents formed sand banks that show a characteristic current bedding or cross-bedding that can often be seen in cuttings. At a time in the past, monocline formed to the west of Sydney. The monocline is a sloping bend that raises the sandstone well above where it is expected to be seen, and this is why the whole of the visible top of the Blue Mountains is made of sandstone. The Hawkesbury Sandstone is also cut by numerous igneous intrusions, including the Great Sydney Dyke, a major Jurassic dolerite dyke extending for at least 9 kilometres (5.6 mi) across inner Sydney. The dyke intruded the sandstone approximately 163 million years ago and is generally several metres wide, although its width and geometry vary considerably along its course. Sandstone immediately adjoining the intrusion is locally fractured, jointed and thermally altered by contact metamorphism.

== History ==
=== Hewing and working the stone ===
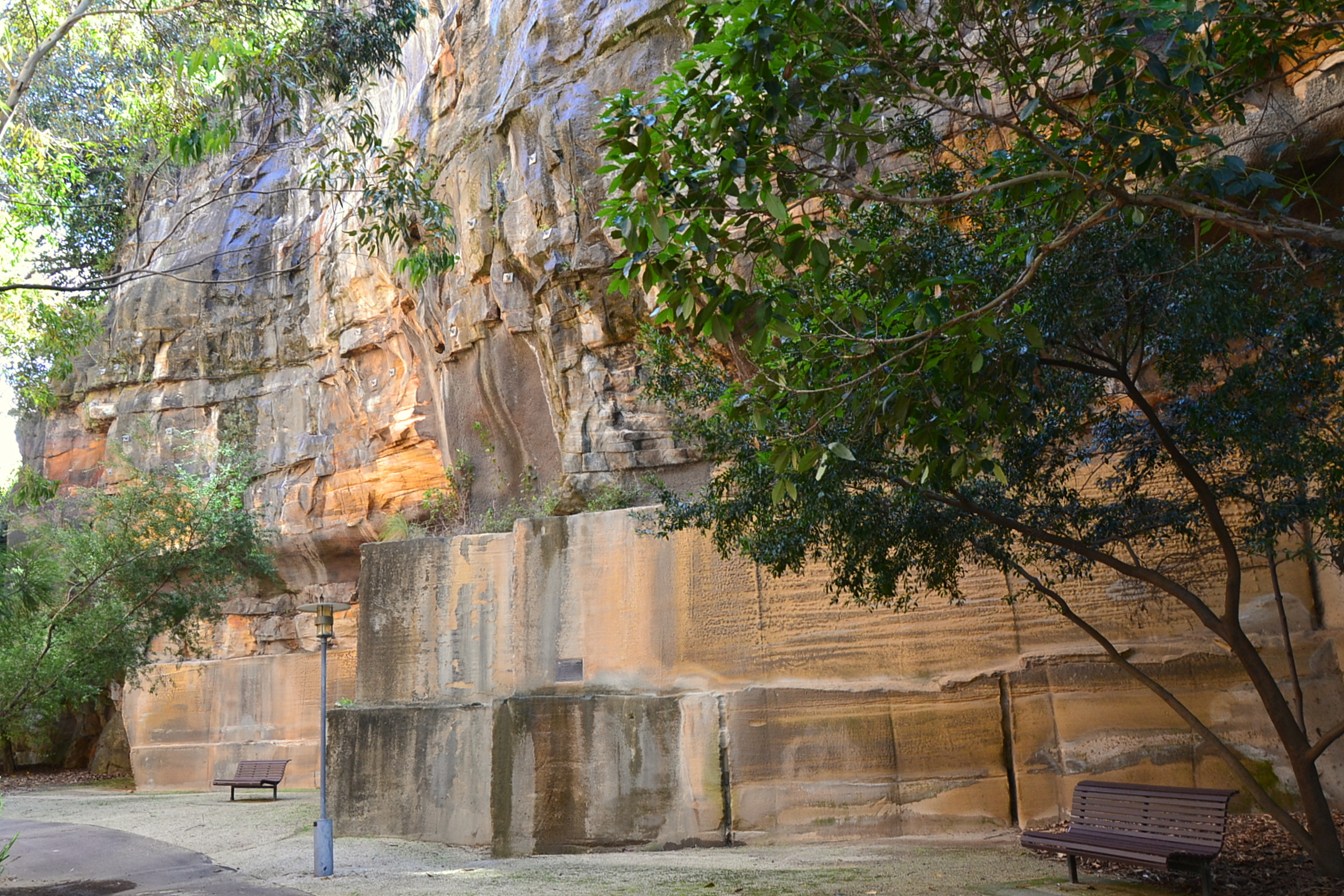
The Paradise Quarry near Saunders Street, Pyrmont

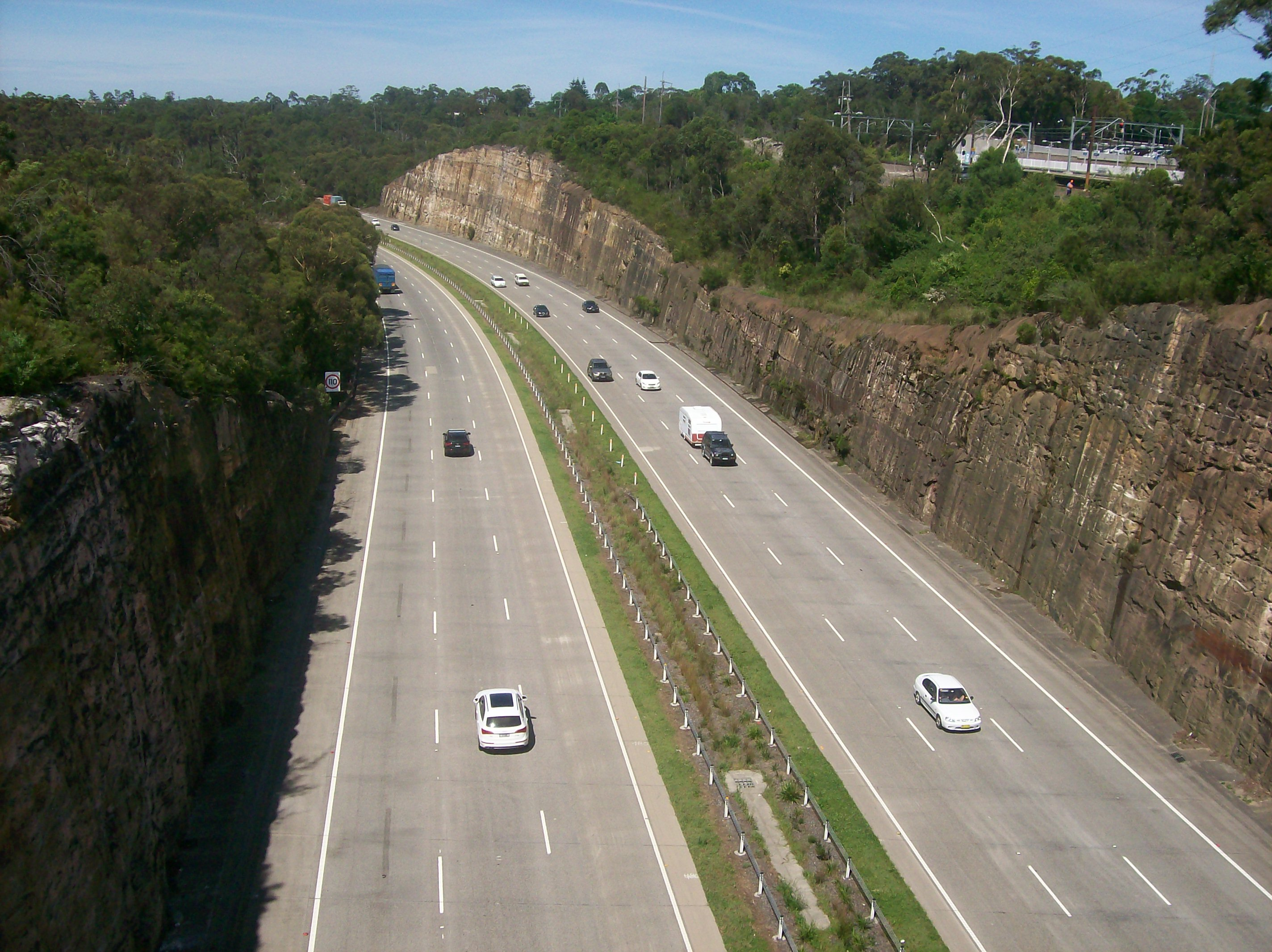
Southbound view of the M1 Pacific Motorway carved through sandstone at Berowra

The quality of the sandstone known to Sydneysiders as yellow block became well known early. Called on by the Colonial Architect, for example, to be used in the main buildings of the University of Sydney, the stone was supplied from the Pyrmont quarries where there were at least 22 quarrymen working by 1858. Among them was Charles Saunders, licensee of the hotel 'The Quarryman's Arms' who became Pyrmont's biggest quarrymaster. Pyrmont yellowblock not only had good hardness, texture, and colour, it was also suitable for carving and so it could be incorporated into buildings in the form of sculptures and finely carved details. The sculptor William Priestly MacIntosh, for example, carved ten of the explorers statues for the niches in the Lands Department building in "Pyrmont Freestone".

From the beginnings of the colony in 1788, settlers and convicts had to work with the stone, using it for building and trying to grow crops on the soil over it. The sandstone had a negative effect on farming because it underlay most of the available flat land at a very shallow depth. In the late 19th century, it was thought that the sandstone might contain gold. Some efforts were made at the University of Sydney to test this idea. Reporting on them in 1892, Professor Liversidge said "The Hawkesbury sandstone and Waianamatta shale was, of course, derived from older and probably gold-bearing rocks hence it was not unreasonable to expect to find gold in them." The sandstone is the basis of the nutrient-poor soils found in Sydney that developed over millennia and 'came to nurture a brilliant and immensely diverse array of plants'. It is, for example, the "heartland of those most characteristic of Australian trees, the eucalypts". As plants cannot afford to lose leaves to herbivores when nutrients are scarce so they defend their foliage with toxins. In eucalypts, these toxins give the bush its distinctive smell.

Saunders's quarries, known locally as Paradise, Purgatory. and Hellhole, were so named by the Scottish quarrymen who worked there in the 1850s. The names related to the degree of difficulty in working the stone and its quality. The best stone was 'Paradise', a soft rock that is easy to carve and weathers to a warm, golden straw colour. The Paradise quarry was near present-day Quarry Master and Saunders Streets, Purgatory quarry was near present-day Pyrmont Bridge Road, and Hellhole was where Jones Street now is, near Fig Street. Before World War I, quarries opened up in other Sydney suburbs, such as Botany, Randwick, Paddington and Waverley.

The men who worked the stone were highly skilled and organised. Their trade union was the first in the world to win the eight-hour working day in 1855. The daily wages for quarrymen and masons in 1868 has been cited as ten shillings, while labourers earned seven to eight shillings per day at that time. Stonecutters were subject to a range of lung diseases such as bronchitis, pneumonia, and a disease known as "stonemasons' phthisis", now known as a form of silicosis or industrial dust disease. In 1908 questions were asked in the Legislative Assembly in the parliament of New South Wales about how likely the men cutting sandstone in Sydney were to contracting the disease and whether the Government should grant medical aid to them.

=== Early building ===
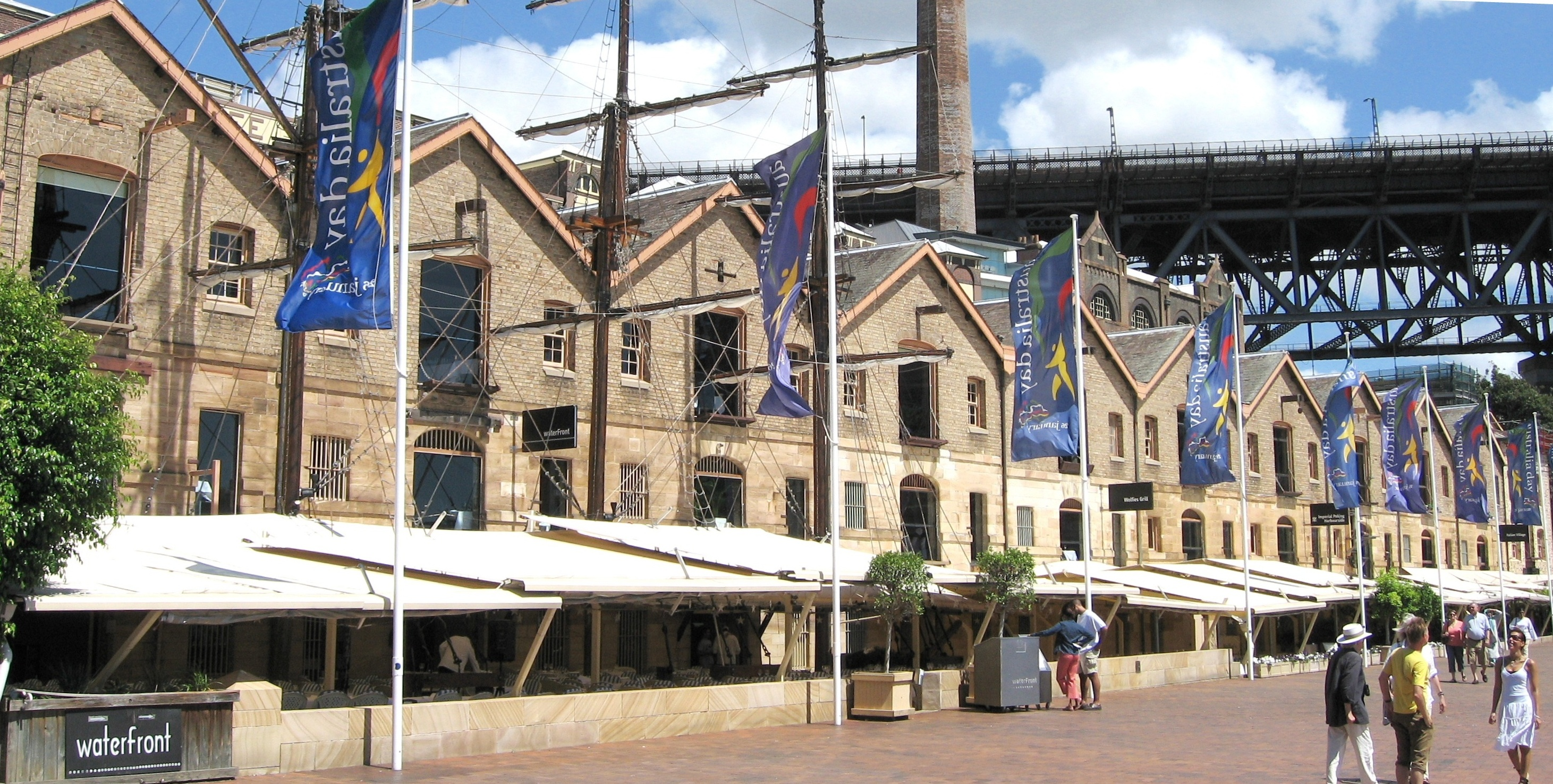
Campbell's Stores, sandstone buildings in The Rocks, Sydney

The early administrators of the colony at Sydney Cove sent groups of prisoners to an area nearby, named The Rocks, to eke out what ever existence they could from the land and build housing for themselves. These first occupants hewed out sandstone from the outcrops and built simple houses. Convicts were also employed tunnelling through what is called the 'Argyle Cut' in The Rocks. The rock was dumped in the mangrove swamps at the head of the Tank Stream to begin to make Circular Quay. Later development in The Rocks area led to bond stores and warehouses being built on the bay, with better housing and pubs for entertainment. Millions of cubic feet of sandstone was excavated from Sydney's Cockatoo Island to create a dry dock on the island.

In the early days settlers found at hand a convenient substitute for stone in the hardwoods, and in Sydney sandstone was so plentiful and so easily worked that no one thought of going afield to explore for something better, and even today [1915] freestone, as the sandstone is often called, is nearly everywhere employed by architects and builders.

Demand for Pyrmont stone surged in the years following the gold rush when prosperity meant that many public and private buildings were constructed. From the 1870s, various building sites had up to 300 masons working and carving the stone. Historians have reported that during this period, there were more masons working in Sydney than the whole of Europe. It was estimated that by 1928 total production of dressed sandstone from Pyrmont was more than half a million cubic yards (about 460,000 cubic metres) and much was carted away to build other places.

The main public buildings in Sydney, completed from the 1850s until the 20th century were built in sandstone from Pyrmont where some 50 quarries operated. In 1909, for example, when an enquiry was undertaken about remodelling the Parliamentary Buildings in Macquarie Street it was reported that "the external work, excepting the southern flank, was to be carried out in Sydney sandstone and the main flight of steps in stone obtained from the Purgatory quarry".

Many of Sydney's early sandstone buildings remain but many have been demolished. Demolished buildings include: Vickery's Warehouse, Pitt Street; Robert C. Swan & Co warehouse, Pitt Street, Mason Bros stores, Spring Street; Harrison Jones & Devlin warehouse, Macquarie Place; Mutual Life building, George Street; The Union Club, Bligh Street.

=== Declining stock and changing attitudes ===
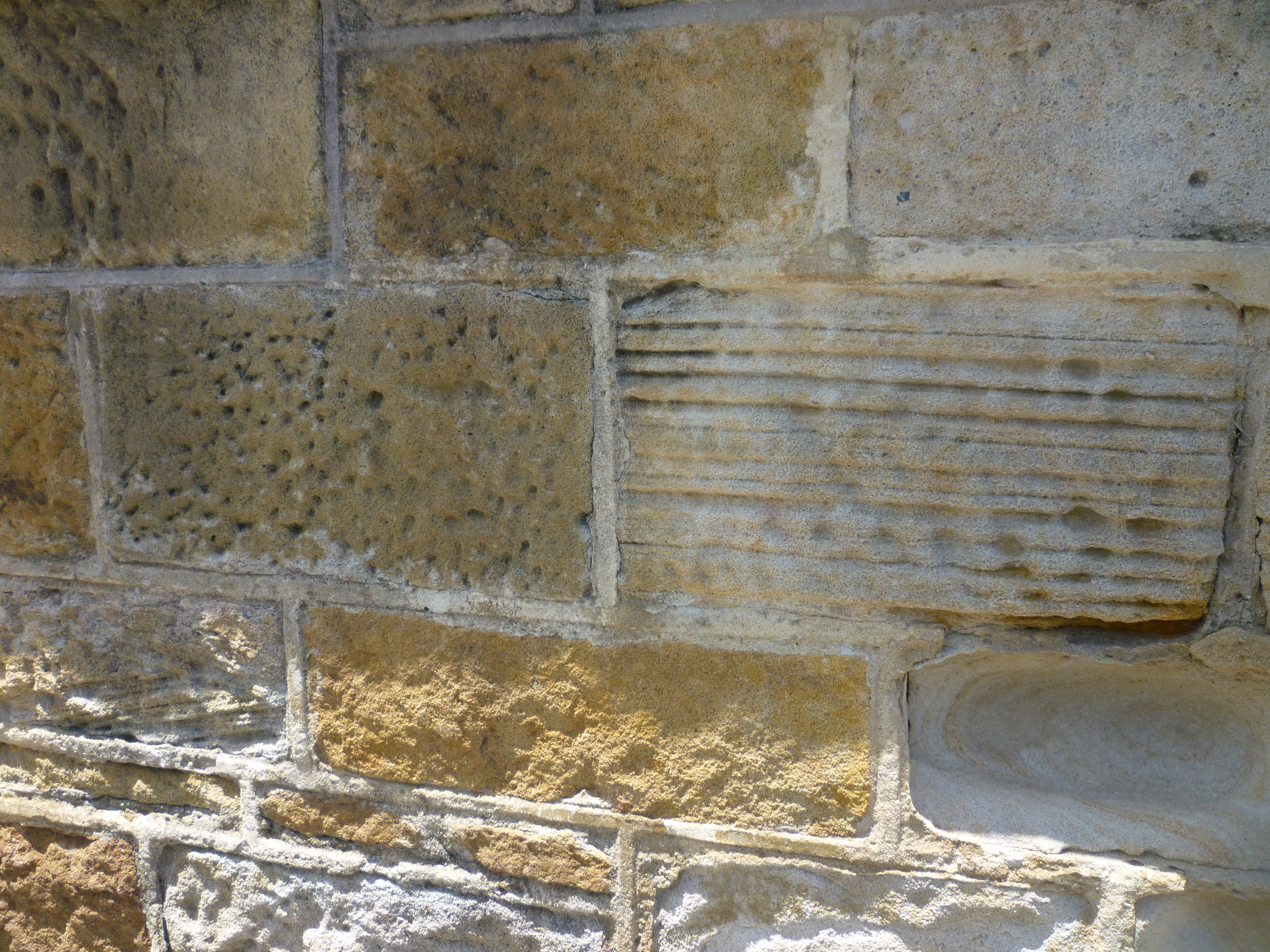
Weathered 19th century wall of Sydney sandstone

Quarries were being worked out by the end of the 19th century and cutting the stone became more difficult than before as depths increased. The combination of slowing demand and technical difficulties forced quarries out of business, although restorations and extensions of important public buildings still required Sydney sandstone. After the Saunders quarries closed, Pyrmont yellowblock sandstone was no longer available.

The stone was still appreciated in the 20th century. In 1938, for example, appreciation of the stone prompted criticism of proposals to use brick in Sydney especially in ecclesiastical architecture. "It Is doubtful if any country in the world has a building stone more perfectly suited for church building than our Sydney sandstone, even for the most delicate and intricate tracery." By the middle of the 20th century, when new modern building materials, such as steel and structural reinforced concrete, had begun to be used, sandstone use had changed.

By 1953, sandstone was "the rock foundation of most suburban gardens". Sandstone buildings were considered old-fashioned and many were demolished. Some gained a reprieve after much debate. The Queen Victoria Building, for example, a grand and ornate building occupying an entire Sydney block and faced with Pyrmont stone, was threatened with demolition and replacement by a car park. A great debate among supporters and opponents of demolition followed. One architect, Elias Duek-Cohen, referred to its material in his defence of the building: 'It has a fine facade in warm-coloured stone ... forming a richly modelled surface'. Demolition of sandstone buildings in The Rocks was forestalled in part because of a Green Ban. A revival began when the heritage value of these older buildings was recognised.

Contemporary reports have noted the contribution of sandstone quarrying to ecological degradation. "Sandstone quarrying is very detrimental to native flora and fauna. It destroys habitat, alters landform, drainage and soil conditions, creates waste pollution, and usually generates noise and dust ... Existing features ... can be removed or obliterated, and local waterways affected by sedimentation. More widely, the extraction and processing of sandstone requires considerable energy, with its related environmental impacts." The impact on the Pyrmont peninsula has been described as an example of "systematic destruction of ecology in favour of economy ... The peninsula may be an extreme example of what happens when 'progress', 'development', 'economic growth' take the box seats of society."

=== Conservation use ===
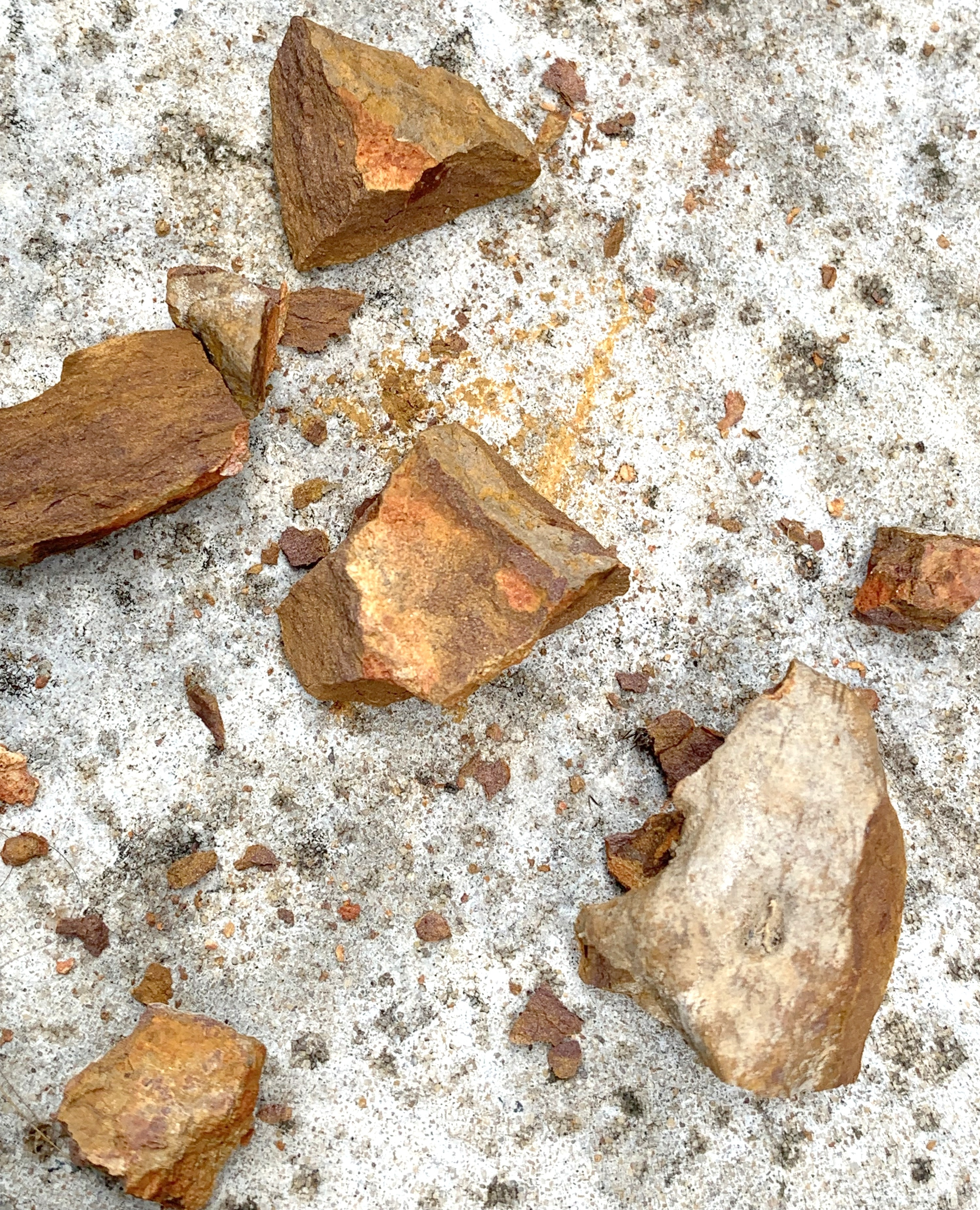
Crumbled, iron-cemented sandstone (Western Sydney)

Towards the end of the 20th century, it was realised that more stone would be needed for future conservation work. The New South Wales State Government established a Centenary Stonework Program to ensure its availability. The program was also a catalyst for private projects as well as conservation and maintenance research. Even though the government rescued large blocks and stockpiled it, shortages continue because developers excavate large building sites and break the material up into unusable pieces.

According to the manager for the State Government's Centenary Stonework Program, Ron Powell, "There is nothing stopping developers at all from just trashing it". In 2008, a Sydney city councillor said that planning laws stand, City of Sydney Council can allow the yellowblock to be "harvested" but cannot mandate that developers excavate the stone in a way that preserves it. Conservation and a revival in use has caused some clashes between principles and practice.

In spite of the shortages, the revived industry continues to quarry, process, and supply the stone for building, landscaping, commercial, and conservation work in Australia. It is now also used as a contemporary building material in major constructions and restorations such as Governor Phillip Tower and the Commemorative Museum, winning international architectural awards for excellence. Architects, such as the Robin Boyd Award winner Graham Jahn, describe Sydney's sandstone buildings as "wonderful".

A small, highly skilled team of stonemasons responsible for maintaining Sydney's sandstone buildings was established early in the 1990s. In 2015 a NSW government proposal to outsource the tasks they carried out threatened the loss of their skills, but this did not go ahead. Sydney's significant sandstone buildings, such as Sydney Hospital, have required the attention of these expert stonemasons, as most of Sydney's sandstone buildings date from the 19th century. For example, in 2012, conservation work was done on the sandstone of the clock tower of Sydney Town Hall as part of a four-year, $32 million project to restore the building. The capitals on top of the tower columns needed replacement because they had been badly affected by weather and pollution. The work required about 26 cubic metres of yellow block sandstone.

Sculptural uses of Sydney sandstone make aesthetic and symbolic use of the material's connection with Sydney's geology as well as its flora and fauna. For example, the Royal Botanic Garden, Sydney commissioned sculptor Chris Booth to design a living sculpture (entitled Wurrungwuri) for its grounds, officially unveiled 9 March 2011. One of the two main pieces of the sculpture is a 'sandstone wave', consisting of about 200 tonnes of sandstone blocks in an undulating form reminiscent of the tectonic forces that created the stone. The sculptor says the design is 'inspired by the sandstone stratas it emerges from and, of course, the link to the sea which it cascades towards ... its evolution is from the geomorphology.'

== Notable Sydney sandstone buildings ==
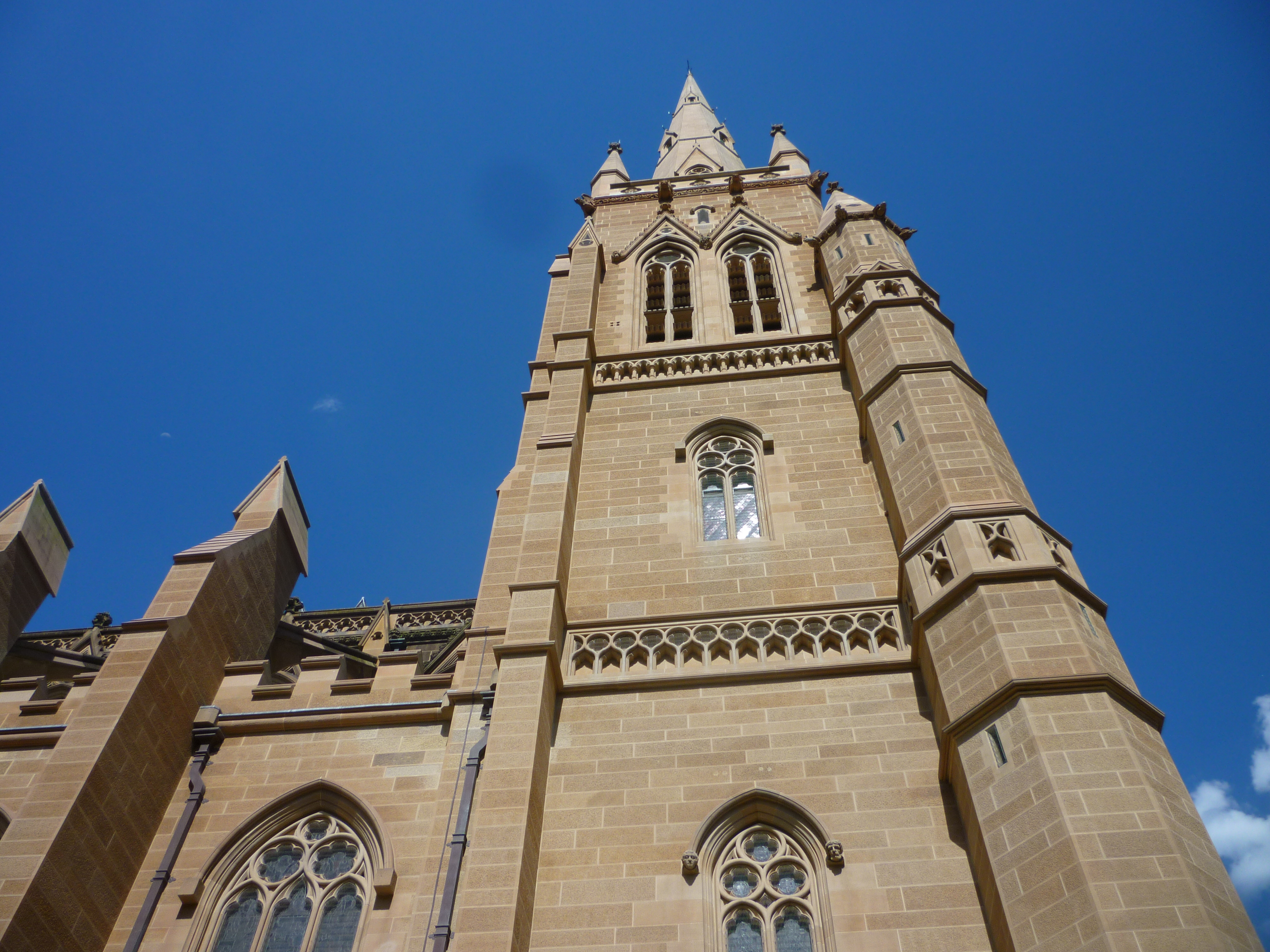
St Mary's Cathedral, formal use of Sydney sandstone in Gothic revival style

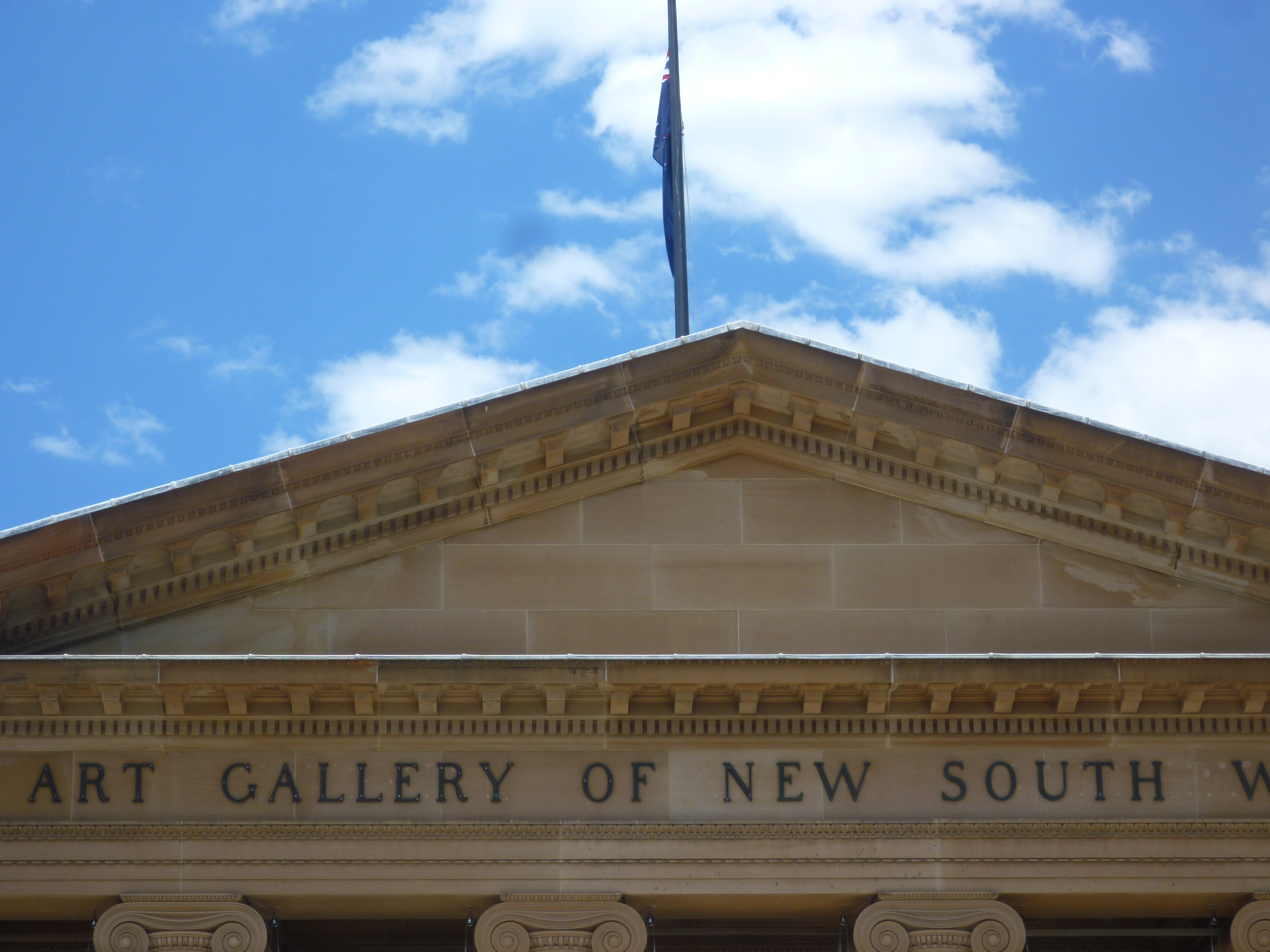
Art Gallery of NSW, formal use of Sydney sandstone in Neoclassical style

=== Sydney ===
==== Places of worship ====
- Garrison Church, Millers Point
- Great Synagogue (Architect: Thomas Rowe, from 1878)
- St Andrew's Cathedral (Architect: Edmund Blacket from 1868) The stone at first came from Flagstaff Hill and then later from Pyrmont.
- St Mary's Cathedral (Architect: William Wardell from 1865)
- St Stephen's Uniting Church, Sydney
- Scots Church, Sydney
- St Philip's Church, Sydney (Architect: Edmund Blacket)
- Christ Church St Laurence

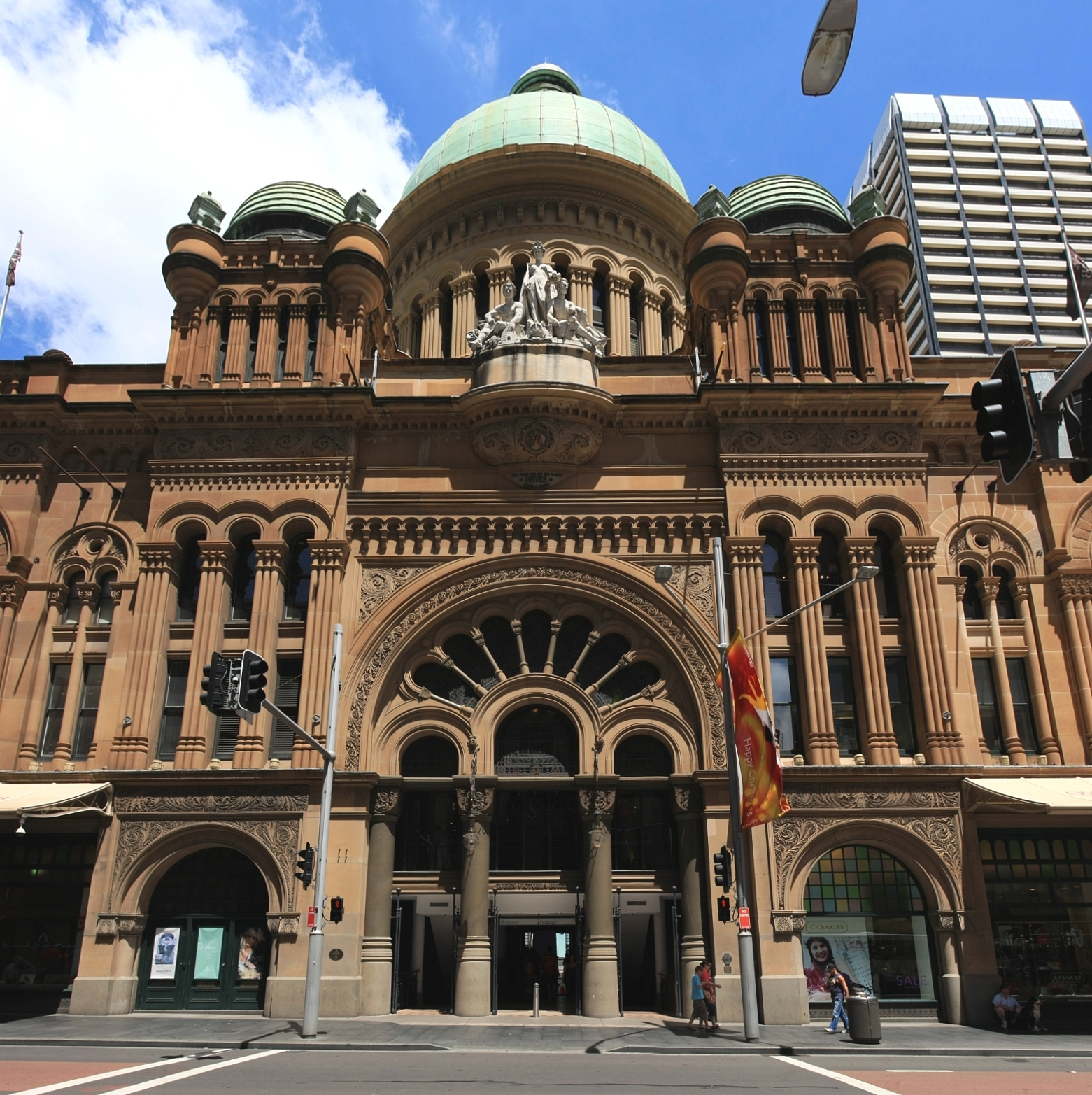
Queen Victoria Building using Sydney sandstone in a Neo-Romanesque style

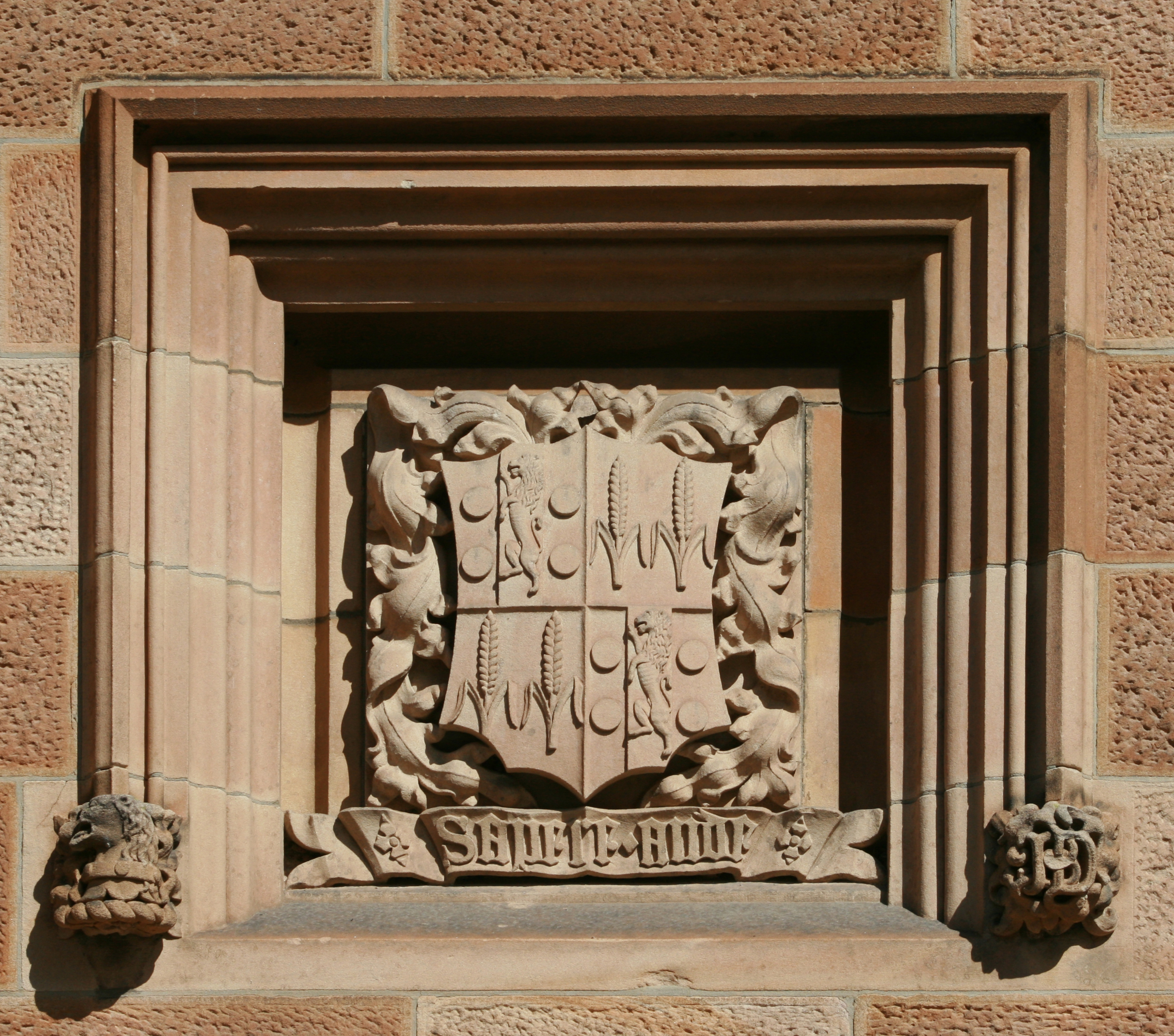
Sydney University Great Hall Sandstone Crest (one of a series)

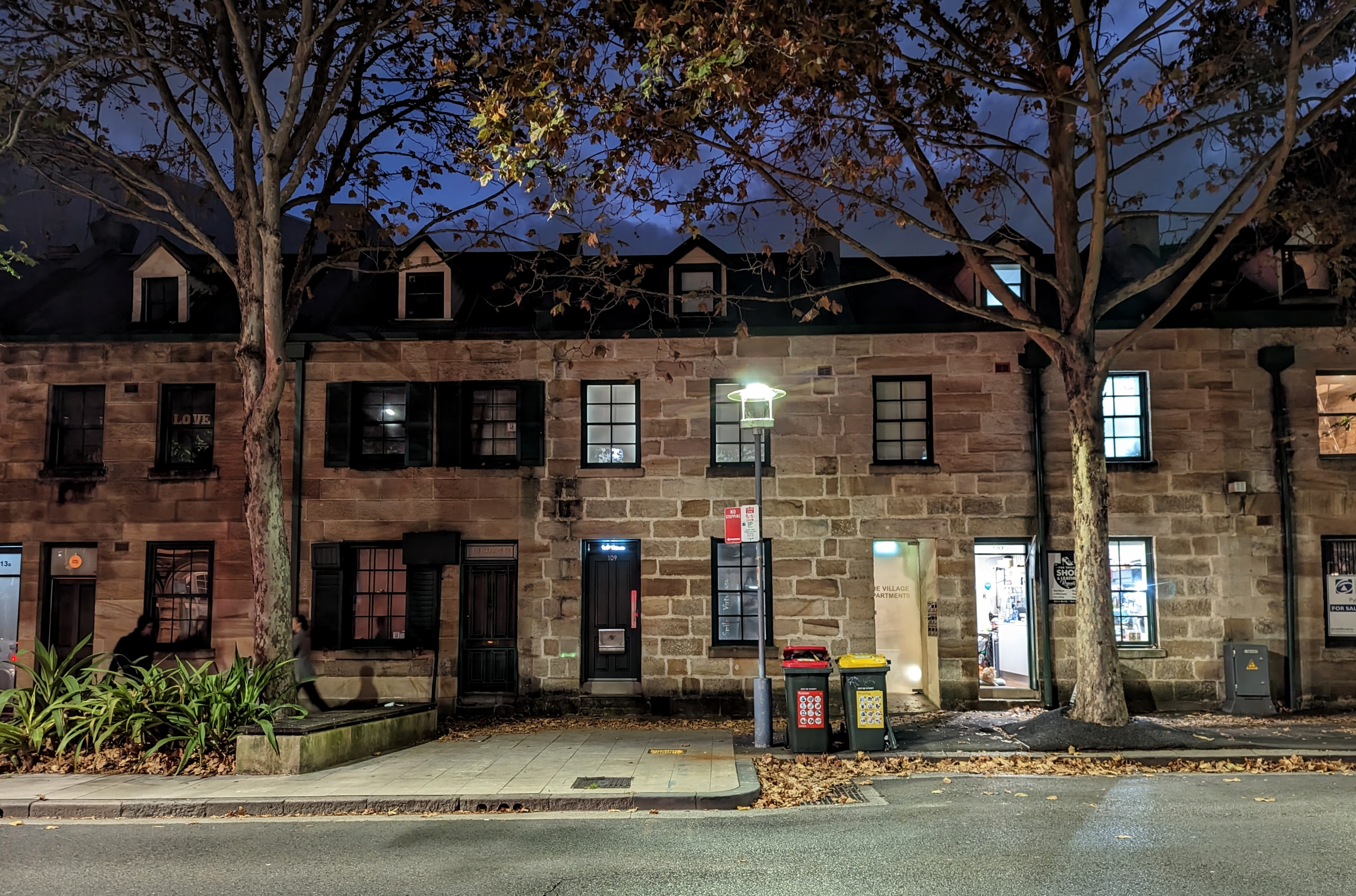
Sandstone terrace houses on Harris Street, Pyrmont

==== Educational buildings ====
- Newington College, Stanmore, Founders Wing & Old Chapel; the colonnade, including its Waratah capitals
- Saint Ignatius' College, Riverview, Main building,
- St Joseph's College, Hunters Hill Main building and Chapel
- Sydney Grammar School, Main building
- University of Sydney original buildings – Great Hall; main quadrangle; original Fisher Library (Architects: Edmund Blacket, James Barnet and W.L. Vernon from 1868); Anderson Stuart Building; St John's College; St Andrew's College; St Paul's College (Edmund Blacket from 1856)

==== Galleries and museums ====
- Art Gallery of New South Wales
- Australian Museum (Architect: James Barnet, from 1864)
- Museum of Contemporary Art, Sydney
- Museum of Sydney

==== Public buildings ====
- Callan Park Hospital for the Insane now Sydney College of the Arts
- Central railway station, Sydney (Architect: W.L. Vernon, from 1902)
- Chief Secretary's Building
- Customs House, Sydney (upper storey, Architect: James Barnet, from 1885)
- Darlinghurst Gaol, now the National Art School
- Department of Lands building, including the statues in the niches (Architect: James Barnet from 1876)
- Department of Education Building Architect: George McRae from 1912)
- Frazer Fountains, one in Albert Road, the other in Hyde Park (Architect: Thomas Sapsford 1884)
- Fort Denison
- Gladesville Mental Hospital
- Government House, Sydney
- General Post Office (Sydney) (Architect: James Barnet, from 1864)
- New South Wales Club, Bligh Street (Architect: Wardell and Vernon, 1884)
- Registrar-General's building (W.L. Vernon, architect, from 1913)
- State Library of New South Wales, Mitchell Building
- Suspension Bridge, Northbridge
- Sydney Hospital
- Sydney Observatory
- Sydney Town Hall (Architect: J.H. Wilson, T.E. Bradbridge, from 1868)
- "Saunders' Terrace" in Pyrmont (unknown designer, 1870s)
- Treasury building, Sydney (second stage) (Architect: W.L. Vernon from 1896)
- Victoria Barracks, Sydney
- Warehouses in The Rocks

==== Commercial buildings ====
- AMFI building, King and Pitt Streets ( Architect: G.A. Morell, 1881)
- AMP building, Pitt Street (architects Reed & Barnes 1860s) (now demolished)
- Burns Philp building (Architects: McCredie & Anderson, from 1898)
- City House, Pitt Street (now Skygarden complex) (Architect: G.A. Mansfield, 1893)
- Colonial Sugar refinery (Pyrmont offices) (faced with sandstone from Green's quarry at Waverley
- Queen Victoria Building (QVB) (formerly Queen Victoria Markets) (Architect: George McRae from 1893)

==== Memorials ====
- Newington College Memorial to the Dead 1914–1918 designed by William Hardy Wilson 1921

==== Houses ====
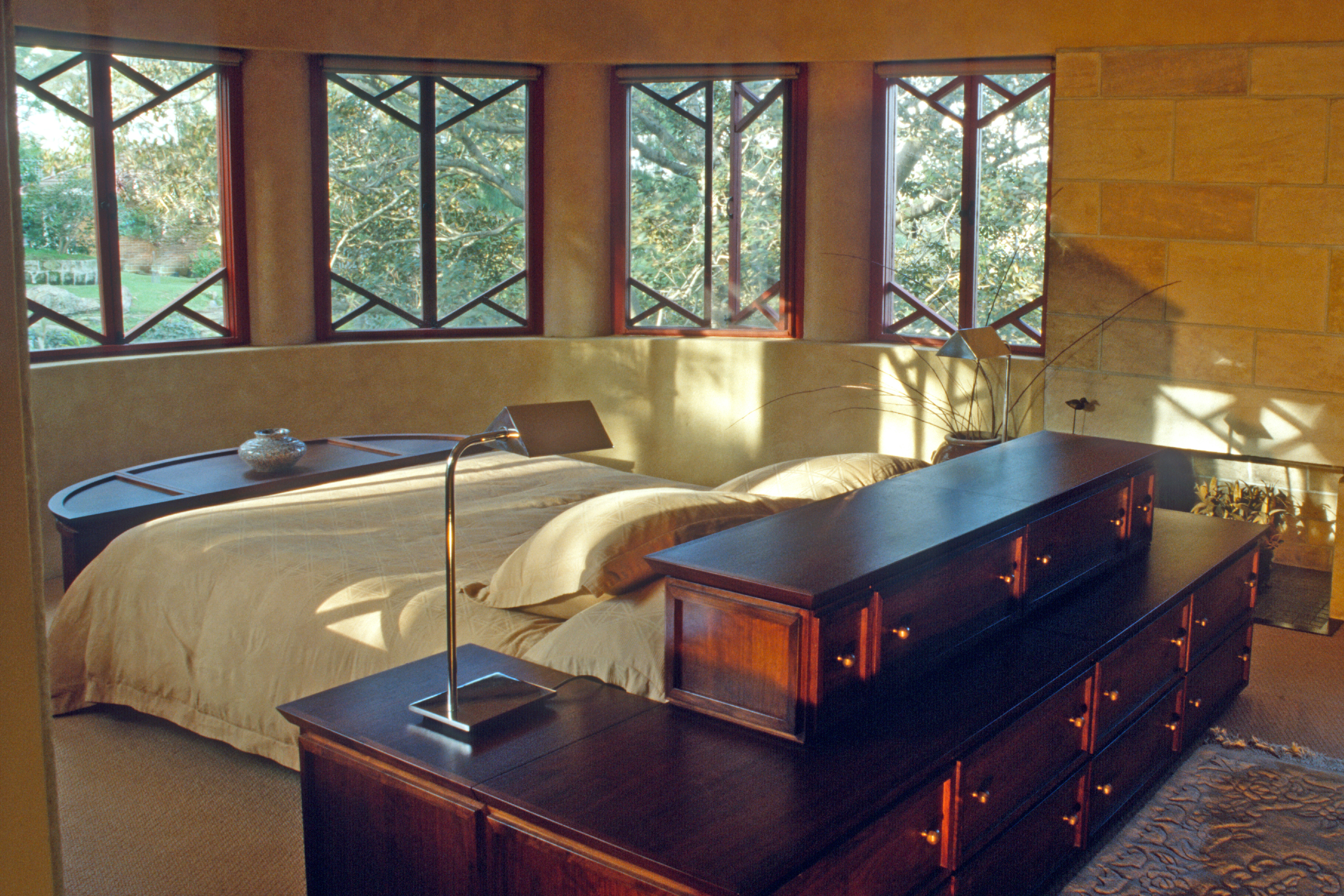
Fishwick House sandstone interior, Castlecrag

- Bishopscourt, Darling Point
- Carthona, Darling Point
- Cranbrook, Bellevue Hill
- Government House, Sydney
- Kenilworth, Potts Point
- Rona, Bellevue Hill
- The Abbey, Annandale
- Rockleigh, Epping
- Rock Lynn, Rockdale
- Houses designed by Walter Burley Griffin in Castlecrag, New South Wales

=== Buildings outside Sydney ===
- The Stone Store, Kerikeri, New Zealand. The Stone Store is New Zealand's oldest surviving stone building.
- Bank of Adelaide, South Australia
- E S & A Bank (now called "the Gothic Bank") (Architect: William Wardell, 1883), Melbourne
- E S & A Bank, Brisbane, front facade
- National Mutual Building (now the Bank of New Zealand) (Architect: Wright, Reed and Beaver, 1903) Melbourne
- St John's Cathedral, Brisbane external facings (Architect: J.L. Pearson and others, 1909–11)
- St Paul's Cathedral, Melbourne, tower and spires (Architect: James Barr, 1926)
- Union Bank, Brisbane (1916)
- Saints Mary & Joseph Cathedral Armidale
- Australian War Museum, Canberra
- Parliament of Victoria

== See also ==
- Ancaster stone, a unique type of English limestone used in notable buildings.
- Hummelstown brownstone, a stone from Pennsylvania with a comparable cultural history.
- Jerusalem stone, a type of limestone used in building since ancient times.
- Oamaru stone or whitestone, a type of limestone from New Zealand, used in notable buildings throughout Australia and New Zealand.
- Tennessee marble, a type of limestone used in notable buildings.
- Geography of Sydney

== Bibliography ==
- Baglin, Douglass; Austin, Yvonne (1976). Historic Sandstone Sydney. Adelaide: Rigby. ISBN 0-7270-1342-4.
- Branagan, David F.; Packham, Gordon H. (2000). Field geology of New South Wales. Sydney: New South Wales Department of Mineral Resources. ISBN 0-7313-9222-1.
- Broadbent, John; Sydney (NSW) Council (2010). Transformations: ecology of Pyrmont peninsula 1788–2008. Sydney: City of Sydney.
- Deirmendjian, Gary (2002). Sydney Sandstone. Sydney: Craftsman House. ISBN 1-877004-09-X.
- Fairley, A; Moore, P. (2000). Native Plants of the Sydney District: An Identification Guide (2nd ed.). Kenthurst, NSW: Kangaroo Press. ISBN 0-7318-1031-7.
- Falconer, Delia (2010). Sydney. Sydney: University of New South Wales Press. ISBN 978-1-921410-92-5.
- Fitzgerald, Shirley (1999). Sydney – A Story of a City. Sydney: City of Sydney. ISBN 0-9586095-1-9.
- Fitzgerald, Shirley; Golder, Hilary (1994). Pyrmont & Ultimo under siege. Sydney: Hale & Iremonger. ISBN 978-1-920831-66-0.
- Flannery, Tim, ed. (1999). The Birth of Sydney. Melbourne: The Text Publishing Company. ISBN 1-876485-45-0.
- Irving, Robert (2006). Paradise Purgatory Hell Hole: the story of the Saunders sandstone quarries, Pyrmont. Singapore: Media Masters. ISBN 981-05-5922-4.
- Karskens, Grace (2010). The Colony, A History of Early Sydney. Sydney: Allen & Unwin. ISBN 978-1-74237-364-5.
- Shaw, John (1987). The Queen Victoria Building 1898-1986. Sydney: Wellington Lane Press. ISBN 0-908022-06-9.
- Stuart, Geoff (1993). Secrets in stone: discover the history of Sydney. Sydney: Brandname Properties Ltd. ISBN 0-646-13994-0.
