= Berry, New South Wales =

Berry
- Town
- Coordinates: 34°46′31″S 150°41′38″E
- Country: Australia
- State: New South Wales
- LGA: City of Shoalhaven
- Location: 143 km (89 mi) S of Sydney; 23 km (14 mi) SW of Kiama; 19 km (12 mi) NE of Nowra; 62 km (39 mi) SE of Wollongong; 214 km (133 mi) ENE of Canberra

Government
  - State electorate: Kiama
  - Federal division: Gilmore
- Elevation: 20 m (66 ft)

Population
  - Total: 2,467 (2021 census)
- Postcode: 2535
Localities around Berry
Bundewallah	Broughton Vale	Broughton
Berry Mountain	Berry	Tasman Sea
Jaspers Brush	Far Meadow	Shoalhaven Heads

Berry is a small Australian village in the Shoalhaven region of the New South Wales South Coast, located 143 km (89 mi) south of the state capital, Sydney.

It has many historical buildings which are listed on the New South Wales Heritage Register, and is a significant tourist destination accessible via the Princes Highway and the South Coast railway line. Major highway upgrades around Berry have bypassed the village, which has resulted in the removal of all but local and visitor traffic.

== History ==
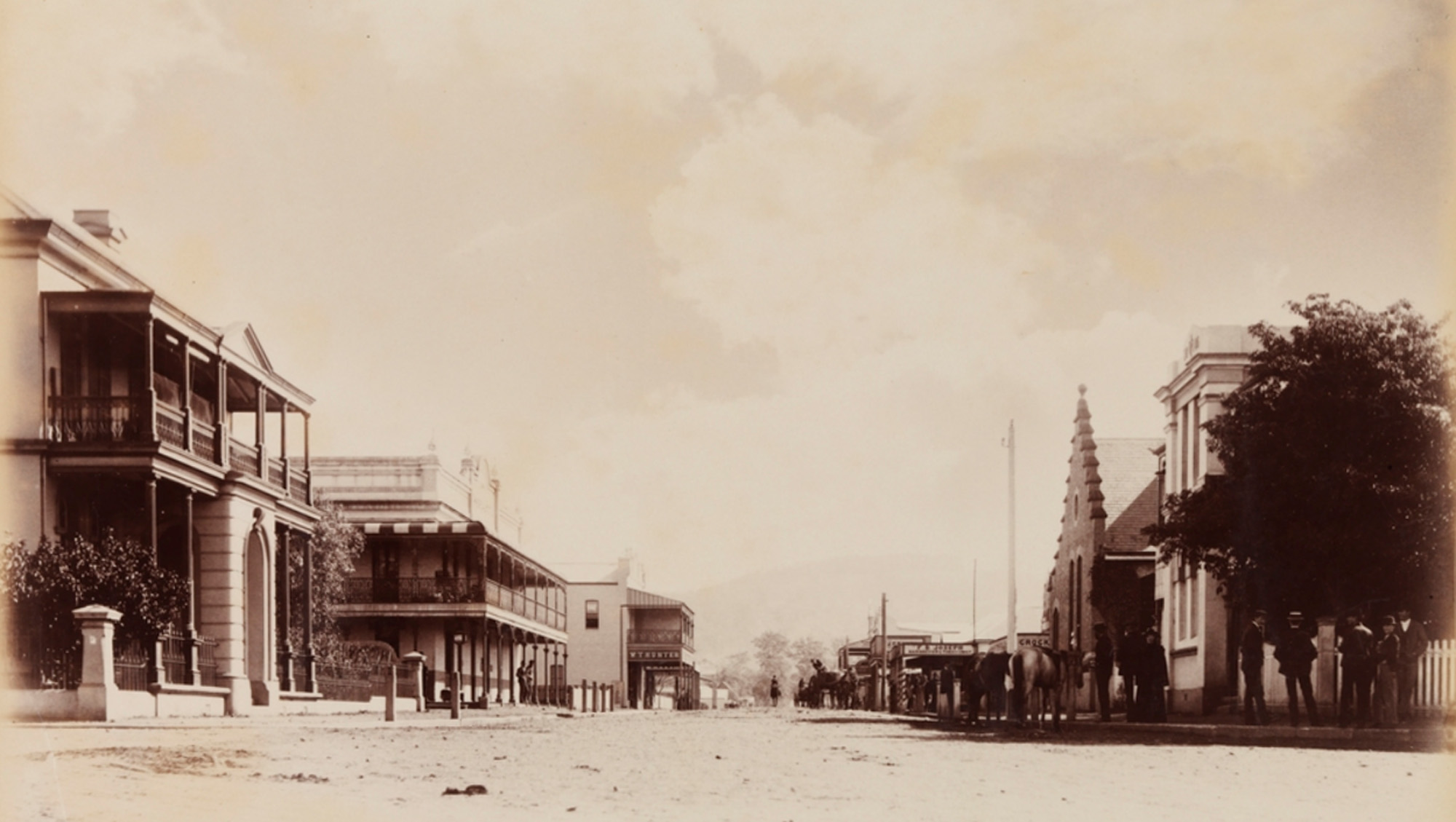
Berry in 1896

Before British colonisation, several clans of Dharawal speaking Aboriginal Australians resided in the region, the present descendants of whom are now called the Jerrinja. The area was originally known as Boon-ga-ree.

In the 1810s, George William Evans, Government Surveyor, reported that the district could serve as a possible settlement and that there were good stands of red cedar. Subsequently, itinerant timber cutters visited to cut and send cedar to Sydney.

Alexander Berry, with his business partner Edward Wollstonecraft, pioneered British settlement in the Shoalhaven region from 1822, initially securing land grants to the south of the Shoalhaven River and later to the north (including the Berry district).

From 1825, the locality became a private town known as Broughton Creek, part of the large pastoral holding called the Coolangatta Estate owned by Berry and Wollstonecraft. Berry had named it after Broughton, a local Indigenous man who assisted him in establishing the estate. Broughton, in turn, had been named by Charles Throsby, likely after settler William Broughton (Throsby's father-in-law). William Broughton was the father of Elizabeth Throsby, whom Alexander Berry had rescued in New Zealand after locals murdered and cannibalised most of the ship Boyd's crew.

The first British settlers of this locality were free and convict sawyers employed by Berry, who camped there in 1825. Soon after a tannery began operation. In the 1840s a saw mill powered by a water wheel started. By 1866, a very substantial town had grown on the either side of Broughton Creek. On the Pulman Street side, a post office, school, tannery and store were established, while on the other side of the creek an inn was opened. By this time the population had grown to 300 and the area was declared a Municipality.

In 1873 Alexander Berry died and his brother David Berry became the owner of the estate. He encouraged the growth of the town by establishing an Agricultural Showground and giving land to four religious denominations to build churches in the town.

The name of the town was changed from Broughton Creek to Berry in 1889, following the death of David Berry, Alexander's brother, to honour the Berry family. After his death the outlying land of the Coolangatta Estate was gradually sold. The town continued to grow and flourish as a service centre for saw milling and dairying industries. From the 1980s, these industries have diminished, and tourism is now an important activity.

== Heritage listings ==
Berry has a number of heritage-listed sites, including:

- Beach Road: David Berry Hospital
- Illawarra railway: Berry railway station
- 135 Queen Street: Berry Museum
- 58 Victoria Street: Berry Courthouse

== Geography and landmarks ==
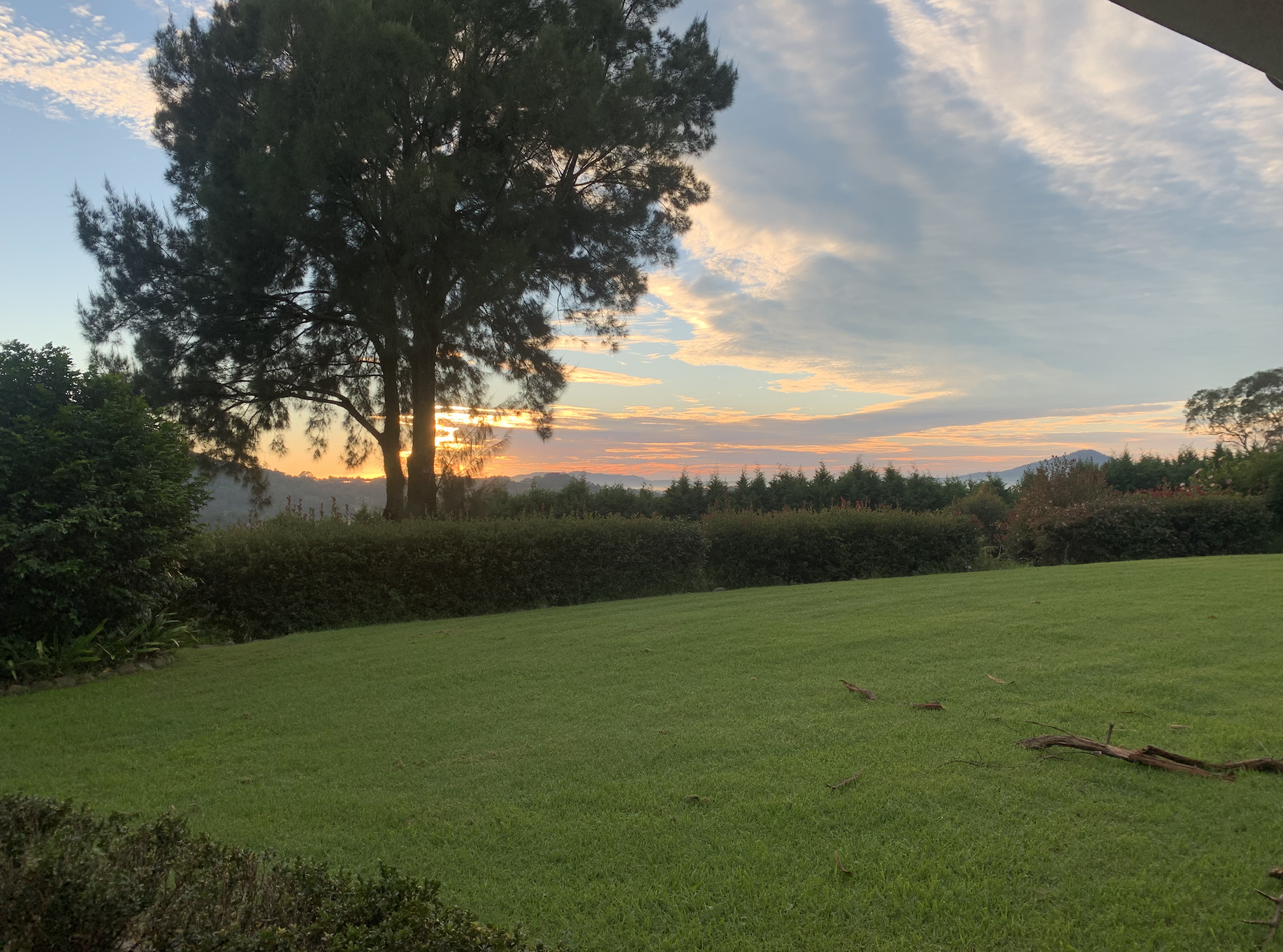
April Sunrise in Meroo Meadow, just outside of Berry

The township of Berry lies on the South Coast railway line, and on the Princes Highway (Highway 1) between Nowra and Kiama. For much of its early history the town depended on timber cutting and dairy farming, with a tannery and boat building also present, but today, Berry thrives on tourism, with many souvenir shops, art galleries, antiques and collectibles shops, cafes, restaurants, and hotels. A local public hospital bequeathed by the Berry family, the David Berry Hospital, now serves as a rehabilitation hospital and palliative care hospice.

== Population and culture ==
Historical population
Year	Pop.	±%
1921	2,281	—
1933	2,628	+15.2%
1947	2,777	+5.7%
1954	1,349	−51.4%
1961		—
1966	924	—
1971	1,049	+13.5%
1976	1,132	+7.9%
1981	1,220	+7.8%
1986	1,375	+12.7%
1991	1,570	+14.2%
1996	1,604	+2.2%
2001	1,590	−0.9%
2006	1,485	−6.6%
2011	1,690	+13.8%
2016	2,065	+22.2%
2021	2,467	+19.5%
Source: Australian Bureau of Statistics data.

At the 2021 census the population of Berry was 2,467. 78.6% of people were born in Australia. The next most common country of birth was England at 7.4%. 93.3% of people only spoke English at home. The most common responses for religion were No Religion 37.0%, Anglican 21.0% and Catholic 20.9%.

Berry has formed a mainly urban rather than farming community, with an influx of city dwellers attracted to a rural lifestyle with ease of access back to the Sydney metropolitan area and its attractions ('sea changers' and 'tree changers'). Most dairy farms have been subdivided into 'hobby farms' of small acreages, and the town businesses have changed to meet needs of tourists and the expanding hospitality industry.

Berry is the first truly rural town south of Sydney, and is situated on a coastal plain bounded by the escarpment to the west, and the Tasman Sea to the east. The township of Berry is surrounded by the districts of Broughton Vale, Broughton Village, Foxground, and Toolijooa to the north, Harley Hill, Far Meadow, Jerry Bailey/Coolangatta and Back Forest to the east (with the beaches of Gerroa, Seven Mile Beach, and Shoalhaven Heads along the coast), Jaspers Brush and Meroo Meadow to the south, and Bundewallah, Bellawongarah, Cambewarra, Woodhill, Wattamolla, and the village of Kangaroo Valley are situated in the mountains to the west.

=== Events ===
Some regular events that draw locals and tourists alike to Berry include: country markets on the first Sunday of the month; the Berry Agricultural & Horticultural Show on the first weekend in February; the Musicale festival held throughout May and June; and the Garden Festival in October. Berry is also home to the Berry Magpies rugby league team, part of the New South Wales Group 7 rugby league competition and the Berry netball team.

During the annual Berry Agricultural & Horticultural Show there is held the Annual Berry Showgirl Competition. This is an event where young women aged between 18 and 25 are judged on various attributes including personality, rural knowledge, presentation, communication and speaking skills, and local and international current affairs throughout a full day of judging. The judging panel consists of three judges selected by the Show Committee. Judging involves a sit down luncheon during the day which is attended by showgirl entrants and judges, followed by individual interviews, and then concluding that evening with a ball, or formal dance, where each entrant is required to give a speech. The winner is announced on the Saturday night of the annual show, in the centre of the main oval, in front of the crowd. The winner then goes on to represent Berry at the Zone judging which encompasses towns from Milton to the Hawkesbury region. Zone winners then compete at the final stage, which is a weeks judging held at the Sydney Royal Easter Show. This event, run by the Royal Agricultural Society, is not a beauty contest but rather a way of promoting and encouraging rural women.

== Notable people ==
- Alexander Berry (1781–1873): Scottish merchant and pastoralist who, with Edward Wollstonecraft, secured land grants in the Shoalhaven area in 1822 and 1830.
- David Berry (1795–1889): Agriculturalist who emigrated from Scotland to New South Wales in 1836 and joined his brother Alexander Berry. He helped to develop an agricultural society among the increasing Shoalhaven tenantry.
- Broughton (c.1798–c.1850) a local Dharawal who played a key role as a guide and intermediary between Alexander Berry and the Indigenous clans of the region.
- Jeff Carter (1928–2010): Australian author, filmmaker and photographer.
- Dorothy Cawood MM (1884–1962): Nurse, matron of the David Berry Hospital, 1928–1943.
- Bill Collins (1934–2019): Film critic and historian, radio and television presenter, journalist, author and lecturer.
- Bettie Fisher (1939–1976): Australian Aboriginal activist, singer and theatre administrator.
- Garry McDonald (born 1948): Actor, satirist and comedian, particularly known for his portrayal of the character "Norman Gunston", and later as "Arthur Beare" in the ABC sitcom Mother and Son
- John McDonell (born 1943): rugby league player
- Broughton O'Conor (1868–1953): politician and barrister
- Jennifer Robinson (born 1981): Rhodes Scholar and human rights lawyer.

== See also ==
- Moeyan Hill
- Group 7 Rugby League
- Coolangatta Estate
