= Moeyan Hill =

Coordinates: 34°47′55″S 150°43′04″E

Moeyan Hill is a small hill 2.4 km southeast of Berry on the South Coast of New South Wales, Australia. At the summit there are telecommunications towers providing Berry, Shoalhaven Heads, Gerroa and surrounds with mobile phone reception for the Telstra Mobile, YES OPTUS and Vodafone Australia networks.

Shoalhaven City Council constructed an analogue television repeater site with funding from the Australian Government as part of the Television Blackspot Program. Analog television broadcast transmissions from the site were to have been stopped 5 June 2012. The site has not and will not be upgraded to digital television. There is a Central Mapping Authority Trig at the top of Moeyan Hill. There is a walking track leading through Moeyan Hill Reserve however, the trail does not lead to the top of the hill, which is privately owned farmland. From the top of the hill the ocean is visible, 4 km to the east, as well as Coolangatta Mountain, Cambewarra Mountain, Gerroa and parts of Berry and its environs.
