= Berry Island, New South Wales =

Coordinates: 33°50′23″S 151°11′20″E

Berry Island
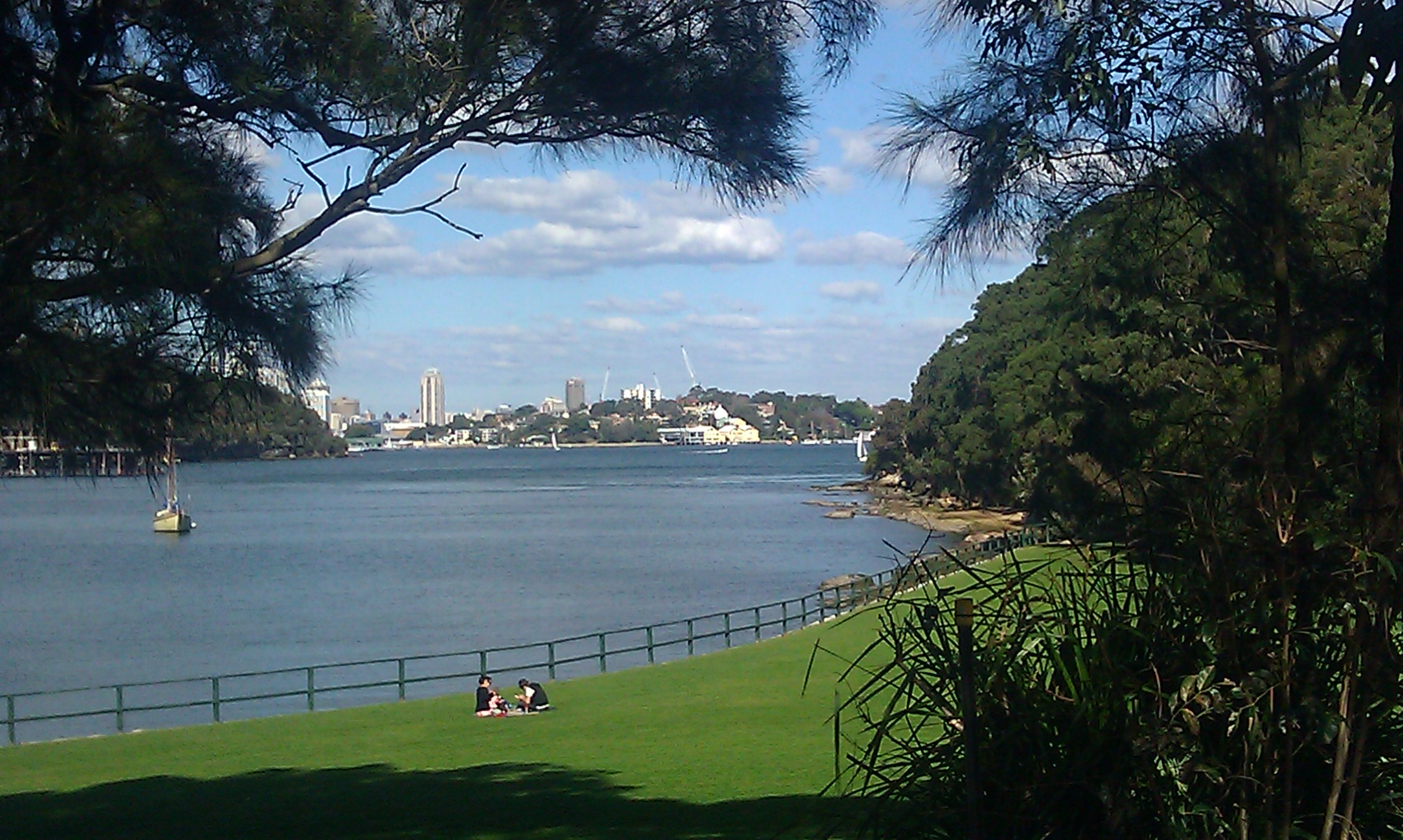
- Berry Island reserve park view.
- Country: Australia
- State: New South Wales
- City: Sydney
- LGA: North Sydney Council
Localities around Berry Island
Wollstonecraft
Berry Island
Port Jackson

Berry Island is a locality in Wollstonecraft on the lower North Shore of Sydney, New South Wales, Australia. It was originally one of Sydney's Harbour Islands, but it is now connected to the mainland by a constructed isthmus.

== Description ==
The area is now a reserve open to the public, with an interpretive bushland walk, playground and picnic area at the site. There is also a signposted Aboriginal site with rock carvings, grinding grooves and a waterhole. The reserve is heritage-listed.

== History ==
Berry Island was part of a grant of land made by Governor Macquarie to Alexander Berry and Edward Wollstonecraft in 1820 and is named after Alexander Berry.

The island was later joined to the mainland by a stone causeway over the mudflats. During the 1960s, the land between the island and the mainland was reclaimed and made into a grassed area.

== Aboriginal sites ==
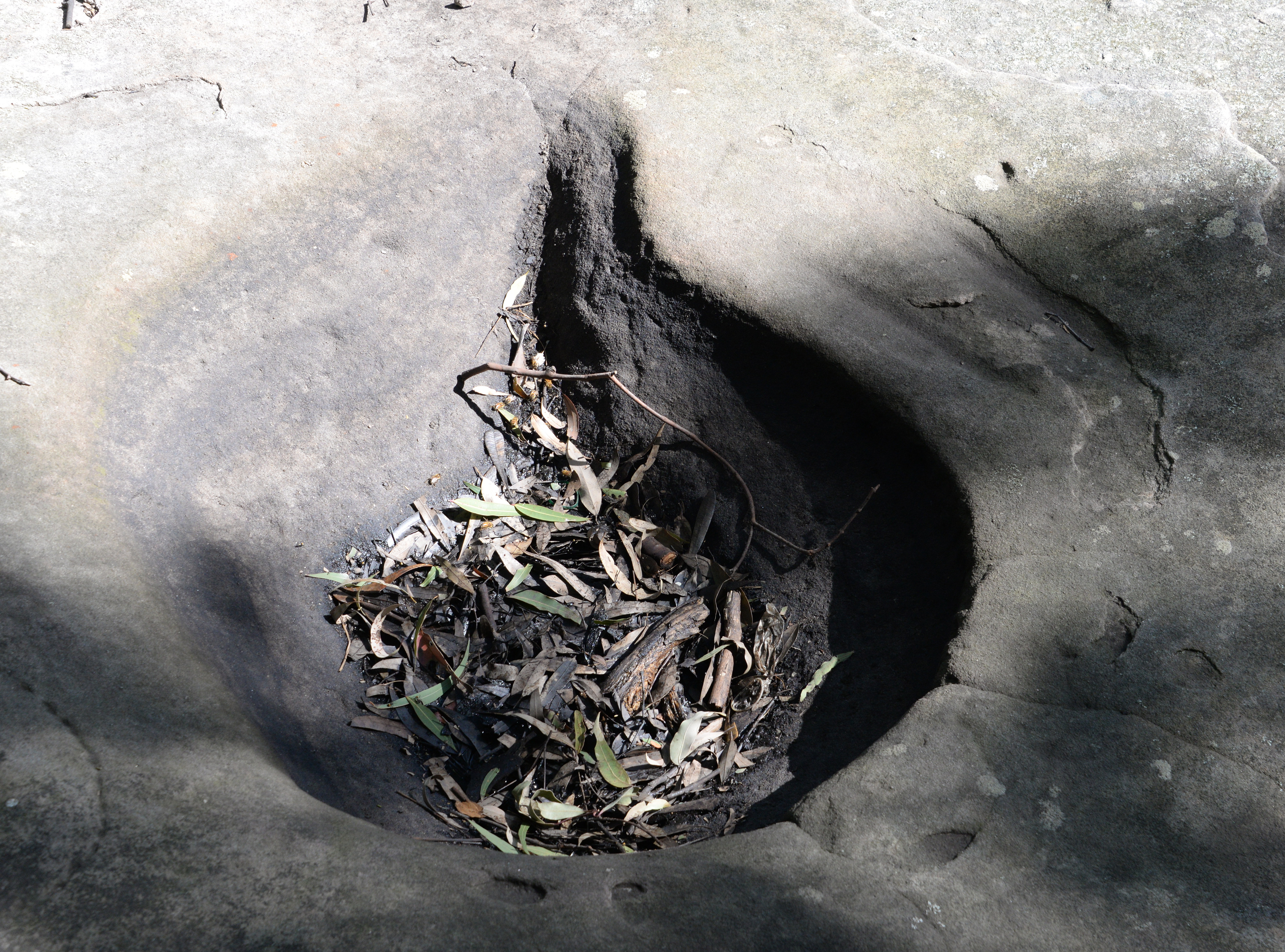
Aboriginal waterhole and grinding grooves (top right) along the Gadyan Track

Berry Island contains aboriginal rock carvings, middens, a smoke-stained cave and a stone tool grinding site. It has a 20-minute (750 metre) loop walk called the Gadyan Track, with interpretive signage describing the significance of points around the island. The main feature of the track is a large Aboriginal rock carving of a whale, with a boomerang-shaped carving, a waterhole and grinding grooves alongside it.
