= Berry Courthouse =

- Location within New South Wales Location within Australia
- 34.7774°S 150.6933°E
- Location: 58 Victoria Street, Berry, City of Shoalhaven, New South Wales, Australia

History
- Built: 1890–1891

Site notes
- Architect: James Barnet
- Owner: Shoalhaven City Council

New South Wales Heritage Register
- Official name: Berry Courthouse
- Type: State heritage (built)
- Designated: 15 July 2005
- Reference no.: 1736
- Type: Courthouse
- Category: Law enforcement
- Builders: Antonio and Peter Ettinghausen

Berry Courthouse is a heritage-listed former courthouse and now function venue at 58 Victoria Street, Berry, in the South Coast region of New South Wales, Australia. It was designed by James Barnet and built from 1890 to 1891 by Antonio and Peter Ettinghausen. The property is owned by Shoalhaven City Council. It was added to the New South Wales State Heritage Register on 15 July 2005.

== History ==
The land for the Berry Courthouse was offered as a gift by David Berry sometime prior to July 1889. The offer was conditional on a signed agreement that the building would be of a scale considered appropriate by Berry. The Department of Justice considered Berry's ideas be too grand and the donation of land was delayed. Just before he died in 1889 Berry finally signed the deed of conveyance transferring ownership of the land to the Government of New South Wales. By July 1889 an amount of £1500 had been approved for the new courthouse and the paperwork forwarded to the NSW Public Works Department.

The courthouse design has been attributed to James Barnet, who was Colonial Architect in 1889, but no original drawings can be located. The courthouse appears to have been built in the centre of the site, as were most of Barnet's designs "isolated from surrounding buildings and well set back with plenty of grounds and with landscaping to match."

Tenders for the construction of the courthouse were invited and advertised in the Government Gazette on 21 March 1890. On 17 June 1890 the tender (£1,593/10/00) of A & P Ettinghausen was accepted. Antonio and Peter Ettinghausen were local tradesmen and Peter was also the local undertaker, so it is quite possible that he was the partner responsible for the fine cedar fittings and woodwork.

Progress of the building was recorded in The Shoalhaven News of 15 August 1891:

"The new courthouse, erected by townsman Ettinghausen, will be ready for occupation in a few weeks time. The "agony" room is spacious, being 35 feet long, 26 feet wide most horrible-looking arrangement, in fact more uninviting than the one at Darlinghurst. The cost of the building is near £1700."

The building was completed in 1891 at a cost of £1,658/10/7 and was one of 25 new government buildings erected during that year.

The courthouse was also used for civic occasions such as the Governor's reception by the Berry Agricultural and Horticultural Society in 1893. The Governor, Lord Jersey was welcomed to Berry at the Courthouse before proceeding to the showground for the official 1893 Agricultural Society Show opening ceremony.

In 1894 the Courthouse Gardens were further developed with 54 trees (unspecified species) and 48 shrubs, issued by the Royal Botanical Gardens to be planted in the Berry Courthouse grounds in August 1894. Apparently the area around the Courthouse was fenced sometime after March 1896.

A new judges' bench and canopy were installed c. 1960.

The Court of Petty Sessions in Berry was abolished on 30 July 1988. The back rooms of the courthouse were then used as a police station until 1994. On 24 September 1994 Elders Real Estate at Berry auctioned the courthouse on behalf of the Department of Courts Administration (Justice Department). Prior to the auction the Department of Justice removed most of the internal moveable cedar fittings, including the jury box, seating and railings.

Anthony A. Graham purchased the courthouse on 24 February 1995. Sometime between February 1995 and July 1999 some of the remaining cedar fittings were removed from the interior of the courthouse to give more access to floor space.

The courthouse was purchased by the Shoalhaven City Council four years later on 14 July 1999. The purchase of the property by the council was strongly influenced by an extensive community consultation program and lobbying by local Berry residents. The Berry Courthouse Conservation Committee Inc was formed after the purchase of the property, and leases the property from Shoalhaven City Council.

The courthouse is now used as a venue for weddings and other functions.

== Description ==
The courthouse is positioned in the centre of its block of land, isolated from surrounding buildings. It is well set back in its landscaped surrounds and is a simple, representative courthouse building constructed of local materials, rendered inside and out with fine cedar fittings in the Victorian Classical Academic style.

Four classical columns of modified Doric form (without entasis) support the portico, which features a wrought iron railing of unusual design. The Royal Coat of Arms sits inside the expression of the pediment above three small rectangular clerestory windows which reflect the division of the facade into three bays. Simple overhung sash windows light the interior; four on either side and one on either side of the main entrance. A simple moulded stringcourse links the line of the portico/porch to the side walls and minor structures to the rear.

Building materials used in the courthouse include the dressed sandstone detailing, brick chimney details and timber panelled doors and timber double hung on the exterior. Interior elements include the timber panel joinery details of the original building, original timber doors, architraves, and oval louvred vent.

The building was reported to be in good to very good condition as of 20 January 2005. The building has been well maintained throughout its life as a courthouse, and restorative work completed in 2000–2001 included repair of slate entrance steps, removal of intrusive interior additions.

The Berry Courthouse is also significant because of its survival, almost completely intact, over a period of more than a century. There is also recorded evidence of the fittings of a typical country courthouse.

== Heritage listing ==
Berry Courthouse is of historic significance at a state level as it operated uninterrupted as a courthouse from 1891 to 1988 and as such reflects the early history of governance and law and order in the region and NSW.

As well as its historic association with the Berry family, early colonial entrepreneurs and developers, it has added historic significance through its association with James Barnet. The Berry Courthouse was one of the last public buildings Barnet designed in his role as Colonial Architect. The courthouse is further associated with Walter Liberty Vernon, the next Government Architect, who supervised the construction of the building.

The Berry courthouse gains its aesthetic significance as an example of a small-scale rural courthouse designed in the Classical Academic style. Its fine, elegant design embodies Barnet's late 19th century concepts of courthouse architecture. Set in its distinctive landscape it is composed as an imposing and austere structure, a landmark for the township which announces its function as the centre of justice in the township.

The courthouse retains evidence of the construction methods of the time many of which are no longer commonly practised, including the making of Royal Arms in NSW. This coupled with its value as an intact architectural example of the work of the great 19th century architect, James Barnet, also contribute to its value as a research resource.

Berry Courthouse was listed on the New South Wales State Heritage Register on 15 July 2005 having satisfied the following criteria.

The place is important in demonstrating the course, or pattern, of cultural or natural history in New South Wales.

The Berry Courthouse is historically significant as from 1891 to 1988 the courthouse was continuously used to deliver law and order in the Berry district. Established by public demand, this small rural courthouse reflects the early history and development of governance in the region and in NSW during the 19th and 20th Century. The courthouse is also historically significant as one of the last architectural designs completed by James Barnet in his role as Colonial Architect. The courthouse was completed in 1891, under the guidance of Walter Liberty Vernon, successor to James Barnet as Supervising Government Architect.)

The place has a strong or special association with a person, or group of persons, of importance of cultural or natural history of New South Wales's history.

The Berry Courthouse has a strong association with David Berry who donated the land for the purposes of constructing a much-needed courthouse for the town in 1889. He was the brother of Alexander Berry who took up a land grant at Berry in 1822. First Alexander and later David made outstanding contributions to the commercial and civic development of the town and surrounding areas and to the development of NSW. The courthouse is also historically associated with James Barnet, Colonial Architect who designed the building, and Walter Liberty Verbnon who supervised its construction as the new Government Architect.)

The place is important in demonstrating aesthetic characteristics and/or a high degree of creative or technical achievement in New South Wales.

Berry courthouse is a small-scale rural courthouse designed in the Classical Academic style by James Barnet. Its fine, elegant design embodies Barnet's late 19th century concepts of courthouse architecture. Much of its fabric represents a style of building and some methods of construction which are no longer utilised.

The building set in its distinctive garden setting is a landmark in the township with important views to and from the site. It is constructed of rendered brick with sandstone detailing and a large Royal coat of arms in the pediment, and is composed as an imposing and austere structure. These qualities announce its function as the centre of justice in the township.

The place has strong or special association with a particular community or cultural group in New South Wales for social, cultural or spiritual reasons.

The Berry Courthouse has had an ongoing special association with the people of Berry ever since it was established at the specific request of the townspeople in 1886. The building is still held in high esteem as demonstrated in the enthusiastic response of the community in ensuring the future of the building after its decommissioning as a courthouse and subsequent sale. The Berry Courthouse has been a prominent feature of the landscape of the Berry for over a century, provides the local community with permanent link with the past, and is significant to the past and present community's sense of place. This association contributes to its local heritage significance.

The place has potential to yield information that will contribute to an understanding of the cultural or natural history of New South Wales.

The original Barnet building of the Berry Courthouse is a rare 19th century institutional building with most of the original 1891 building fabric intact. The original building fabric and configuration can be clearly and easily identified, and the skills of designers and the tradesmen of the time are clearly evident. Much of the fabric of the courthouse building represents a style of building and some methods of construction which are no longer utilised, making the building a valuable research resource. There is also recorded evidence of the fittings of a typical country courthouse. The place has the potential to yield oral history information, archaeological and horticultural data as well as technical information.

The place possesses uncommon, rare or endangered aspects of the cultural or natural history of New South Wales.

As one of the last designs completed by Barnet in his role as Colonial Architect, the Berry courthouse demonstrates the synthesis of the skills and design abilities gathered over his 28 years in that role. Its construction having been supervised by the incoming Government architect; Vernon is also a rare example of the crossover of two very different approaches to the design of government buildings.

The place is important in demonstrating the principal characteristics of a class of cultural or natural places/environments in New South Wales.

The Berry Courthouse is a rare example of a small scale early rural courthouse designed by Barnet. It is a fine, elegant design, embodying the complex architectural ideas and processes of one of the most talented of the early Australian architects. Barnet's courthouses were variations on a type which was responsive to colonial hierarchy of the time. Two of his courthouses, Bathurst Courthouse and Goulburn Court House, are classics of the period. Similar in plan and form, both buildings have monumental entrance porticos and building features. The smaller country towns had humbler versions of the temple as courthouse as exemplified by the Berry Courthouse. Barnet's buildings will always remain as the landmarks and focal points of most country towns in New South Wales. It embodies the late 19th century concepts of courthouse designs by the Colonial Architect's office for the creation of major institutions within their design portfolio.
