= Coolangatta (disambiguation) =

Coolangatta is the southernmost suburb of Gold Coast City, Queensland, Australia.

Coolangatta may also refer to:

- Town of Coolangatta, Queensland (1914-1949), former town in South East Queensland
- Coolangatta, New South Wales, a locality on the New South Wales South Coast
- Gold Coast Airport, airport on the Queensland Gold Coast known as Coolangatta Airport until 1999
