= David Berry Hospital =

Geography
- Location: Beach Road, Berry, City of Shoalhaven, New South Wales, Australia

Organisation
- Type: Specialist

Services
- Beds: 26
- Speciality: Rehabilitation inpatient Palliative Care inpatient

Links
- Website: David Berry Hospital
- Lists: Hospitals in Australia
- Location within New South Wales
- 34.7756°S 150.7148°E

History
- Built: 1909

Site notes
- Architect(s): Howard Joseland and Walter Liberty Vernon
- Owner: NSW Department of Health

New South Wales Heritage Register
- Official name: David Berry Hospital Precinct; Original Buildings & Gate House – David Berry Hospital
- Type: state heritage (complex / group)
- Designated: 2 April 1999
- Reference no.: 822
- Type: Hospital
- Category: Health Services

David Berry Hospital is a Rehabilitation hospital at Berry on the South Coast of New South Wales, Australia. It was designed by Howard Joseland and Walter Liberty Vernon and built in 1909. The original hospital buildings and gatehouse were added to the New South Wales State Heritage Register on 2 April 1999.

== History ==
David Berry Hospital was established as a result of a bequest left to the people of Berry by David Berry, who died in 1899. Berry left £100,000 "for the purpose of erecting a hospital for diseases for the benefit particularly of inhabitants of Broughton Creek and the District of Shoalhaven". A temporary hospital was established but proved inadequate, so the state government passed the David Berry Hospital Act 1906 providing for the construction of a permanent hospital and requiring its construction within ten years. In return, upon a commitment to "provide and maintain for all time" a hospital in the Berry district, David Berry's trustees gave the state government 88 acres of land at North Sydney. The hospital was opened on 18 September 1909 by Premier of New South Wales Charles Wade. The cost of construction was £7,900.

The hospital was expanded in 1921, with additions to the sanitary index attached to the isolation wards, and again in 1936, when an "Aborigines ward", a maternity ward adjoining the women's ward and a small general purposes ward adjoining the men's ward were added.

It was renovated in part in 1975.

== Services ==
The hospital today provides rehabilitation and palliative care services to the Shoalhaven district. It has 26 inpatient beds, with 17 beds for rehabilitation patients and 9 for palliative care patients.

The Karinya Palliative Care Unit is located in a standalone building in the hospital grounds.

== Heritage listing ==
David Berry Hospital Precinct is of State heritage significance for its historical association with David Berry. It is also of architectural and aesthetic significance for is association with designer Colonial Architect Walter Liberty Vernon and Howard Joseland.

The listing includes the central main building and gatehouse. The central main building is of two storey construction and flanked either side by single storey wings. The gate house is also of note. It is constructed in red brick with a slate roof. The upper section is stucco on a sandstone base with stucco decorative detailing.

David Berry Hospital Precinct was listed on the New South Wales State Heritage Register on 2 April 1999.
