= Howard Joseland =

English architect

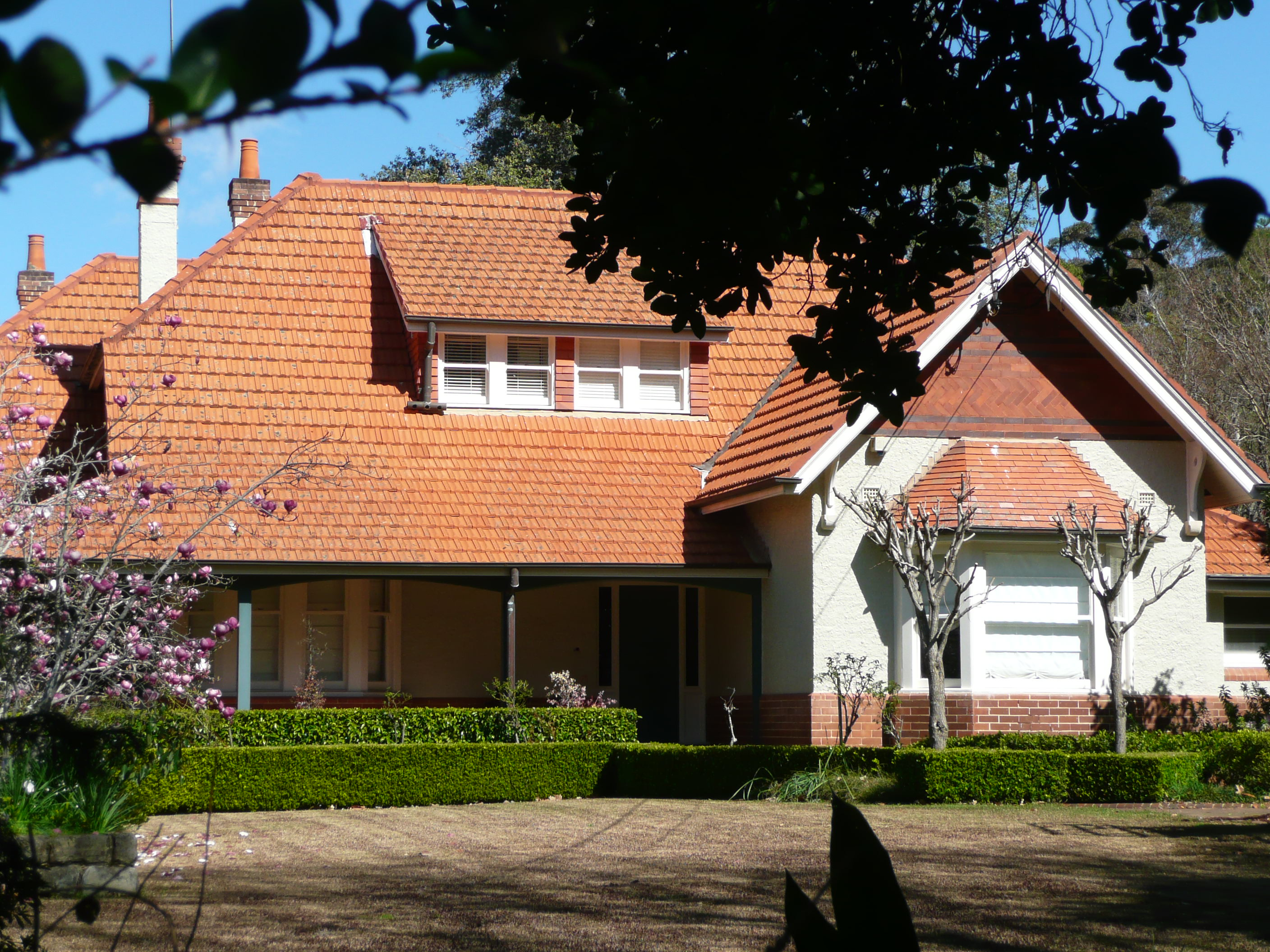
- Malvern, Joseland's home in Burns Road, Wahroonga
- Born: 1860; England
- Died: 1930 (aged 69–70); Darlinghurst
- Known for: architecture

Howard Joseland (1860–1930) was an English architect who migrated to Australia and pursued a successful and influential career there.

== Early life ==
Richard George Howard Joseland was born on 14 January 1860 at Claines, Worcestershire, England, the son of a wine merchant. In the early days of his career, he was articled to the Haddon Brothers at Hereford, but moved to London in 1881. There, he obtained a position as assistant to George Robinson in the architectural company George Trollope and Sons. In time, his health suffered as a result of overwork, and he was advised to migrate to a more temperate clime. He went to New Zealand, where he worked on the railways for six months. He then moved to Sydney, Australia, in 1888, where he married Alice Taylor.

== Career in Australia ==
In Sydney, Joseland met Walter Liberty Vernon, another English architect who had migrated to Australia for health reasons. The two architects joined forces and entered a competition to design a model suburb. It was the first of several projects they would work on together. In 1890, Vernon became New South Wales Government Architect, as a result of which he handed his private practice over to Joseland.

Joseland had relatively little work during the Depression of the 1890s; to make things even worse, his wife Alice died in 1891. In 1897 Joseland married Blanche Hay. His practice also began to recover with commissions in 1898. In 1903, he took on Hugh Vernon—a son of Walter Vernon—who had been Joseland's pupil. The practice took on a variety of commissions, including commercial buildings, but Joseland's clientele was predominantly well-off people who required comfortable homes. Many of them were moving into the new residential areas in Sydney's north, where suburbs like Wahroonga and Warrawee developed. Joseland is credited with designing something like nineteen homes in these areas. His output included his own home, Malvern, which he built in 1900 in Burns Road, Wahroonga. He designed it in the Federation Bungalow style, featuring a prominent veranda to create shade.

From 1914 to 1919, Joseland conducted a solo practice before joining forces with F. Glynn Gilling, another young English architect who had migrated to Australia. Joseland retired in 1929, selling the business to Gilling, who retained the business name Joseland and Gilling. Joseland was active in various community activities and musical societies, as well as being a keen fisherman and author of the book Angling in Australia and Elsewhere, which was published in 1921. He also found time to visit England twice with his wife Blanche. He died of cancer in the eastern Sydney suburb of Darlinghurst on 20 July 1930, and was buried at South Head Cemetery in another eastern Sydney suburb, Vaucluse.

== Influence ==
Joseland was one of the earliest architects in Australia to reject the Victorian architectural styles that had developed in England and which had little relevance to the Australian climate. He wrote a magazine article, Domestic Architecture in Australia (published in 1890), in which he advocated architectural styles that were suitable for the local climate. Like Walter Liberty Vernon, he favoured the styles of the Federation era (1890–1915) and actually contributed to the development of the Australian version of the Queen Anne style, which ultimately became the most popular residential style in Australia in the first decade of the 20th century. This latter style had arrived in Australia in 1885 with the construction of Caerleon, Bellevue Hill; its influence can be seen strongly in the homes Joseland designed for his clientele, along with the Arts and Crafts style that was also popular.

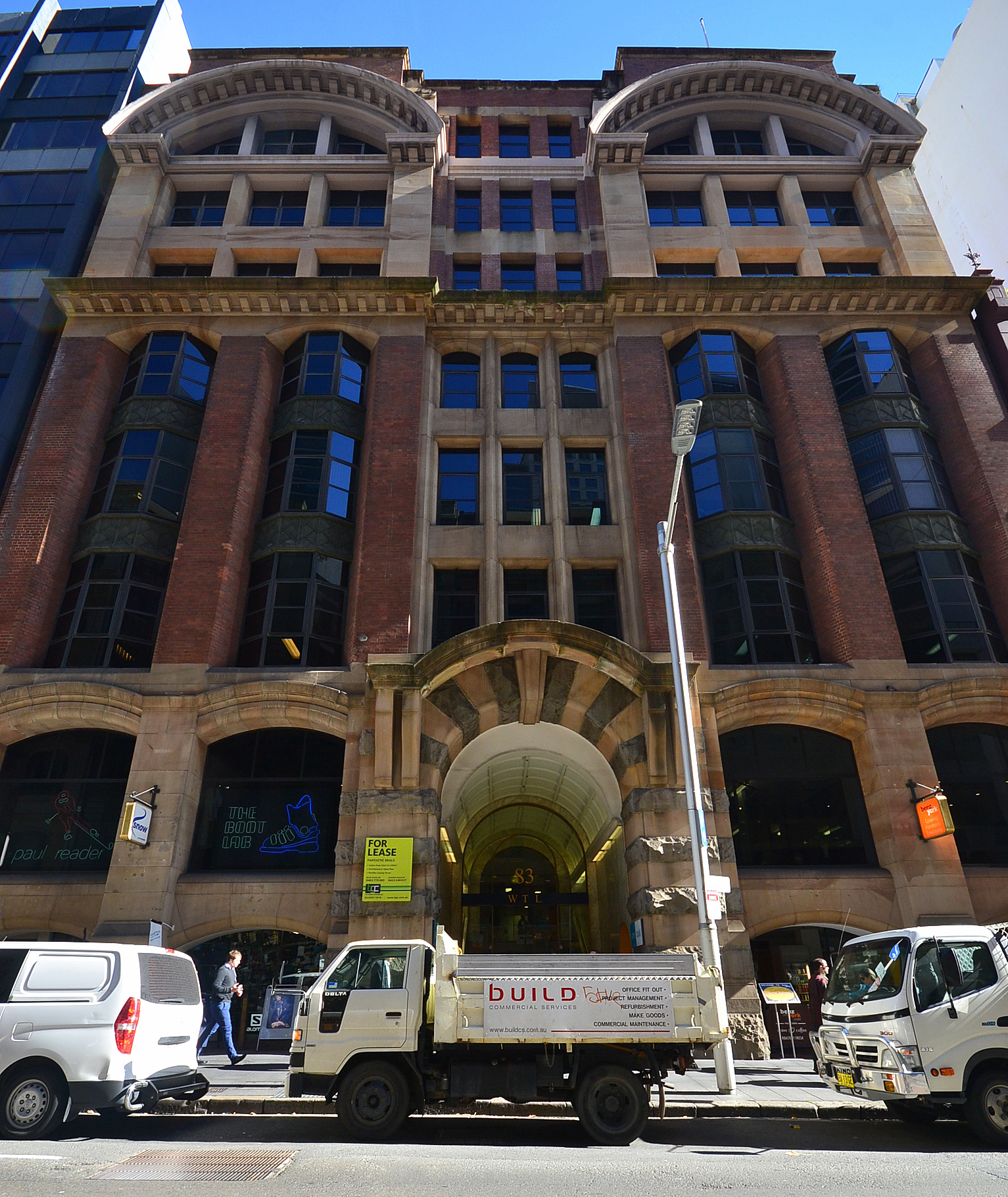
Paterson, Bruce and Reid building, 83 York Street, Sydney

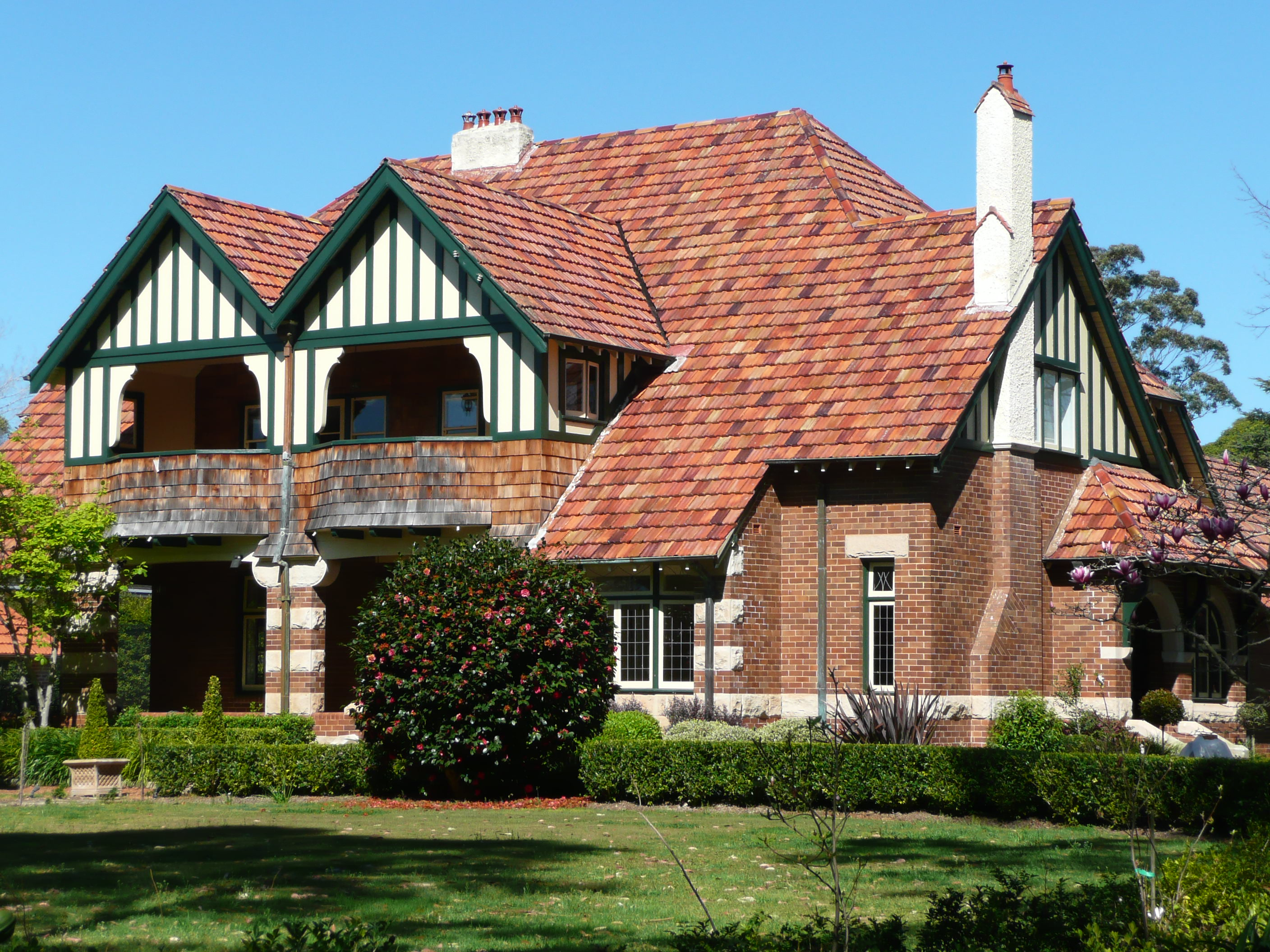
Craignairn, Burns Road, Wahroonga

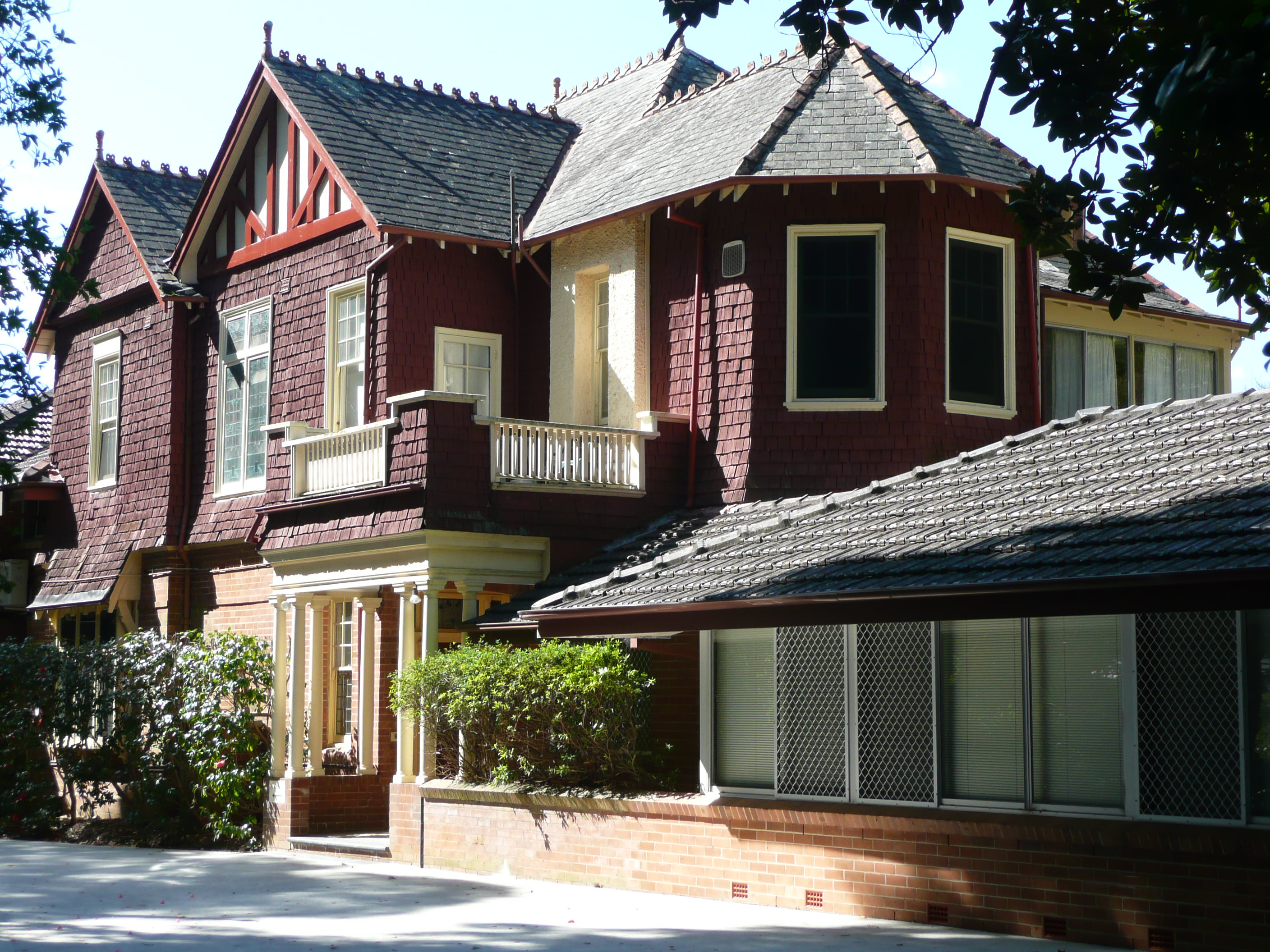
Midhope (St Edmund's School), Burns Road, Wahroonga

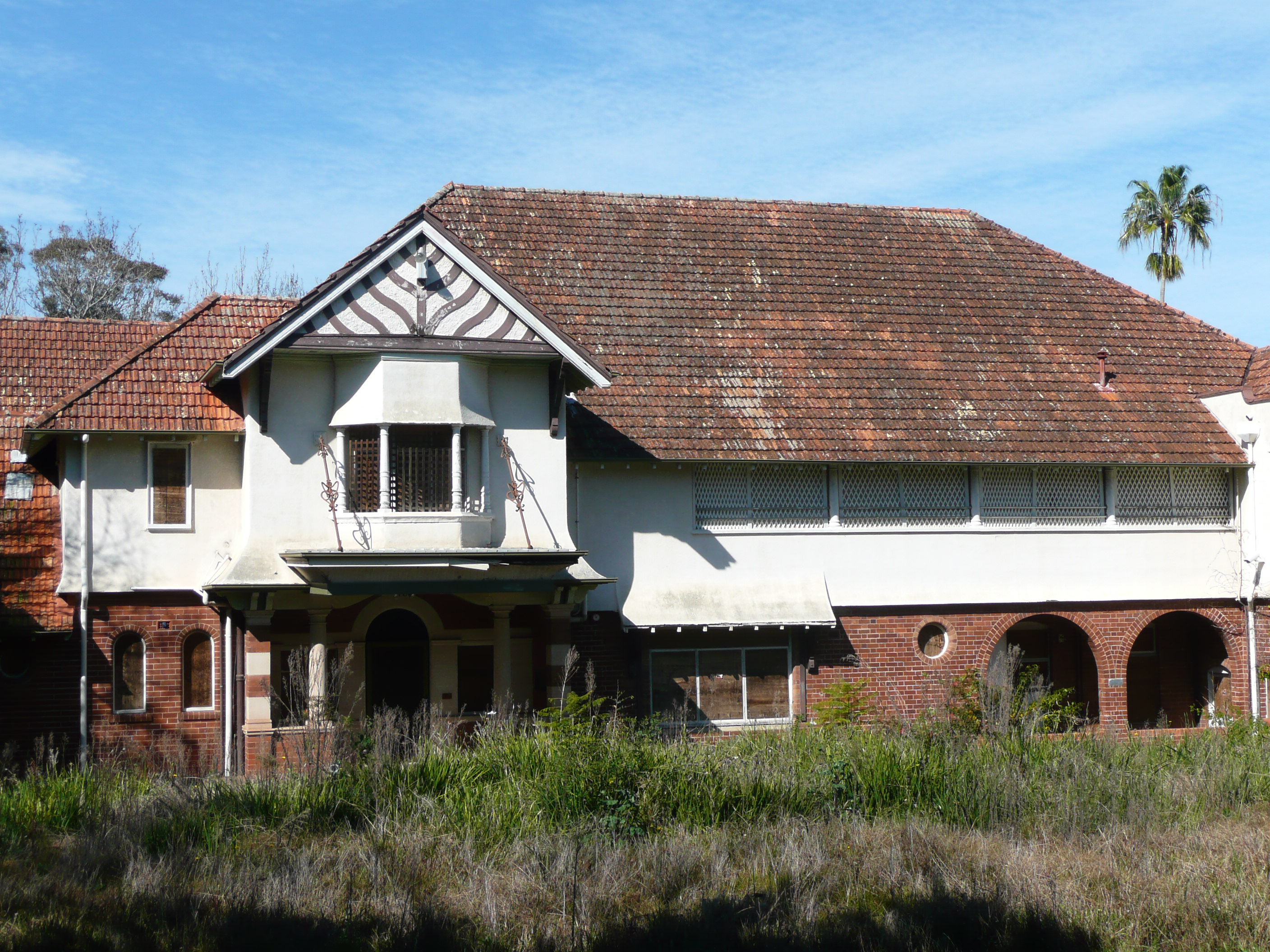
Rippon Grange, Water Street, Wahroonga

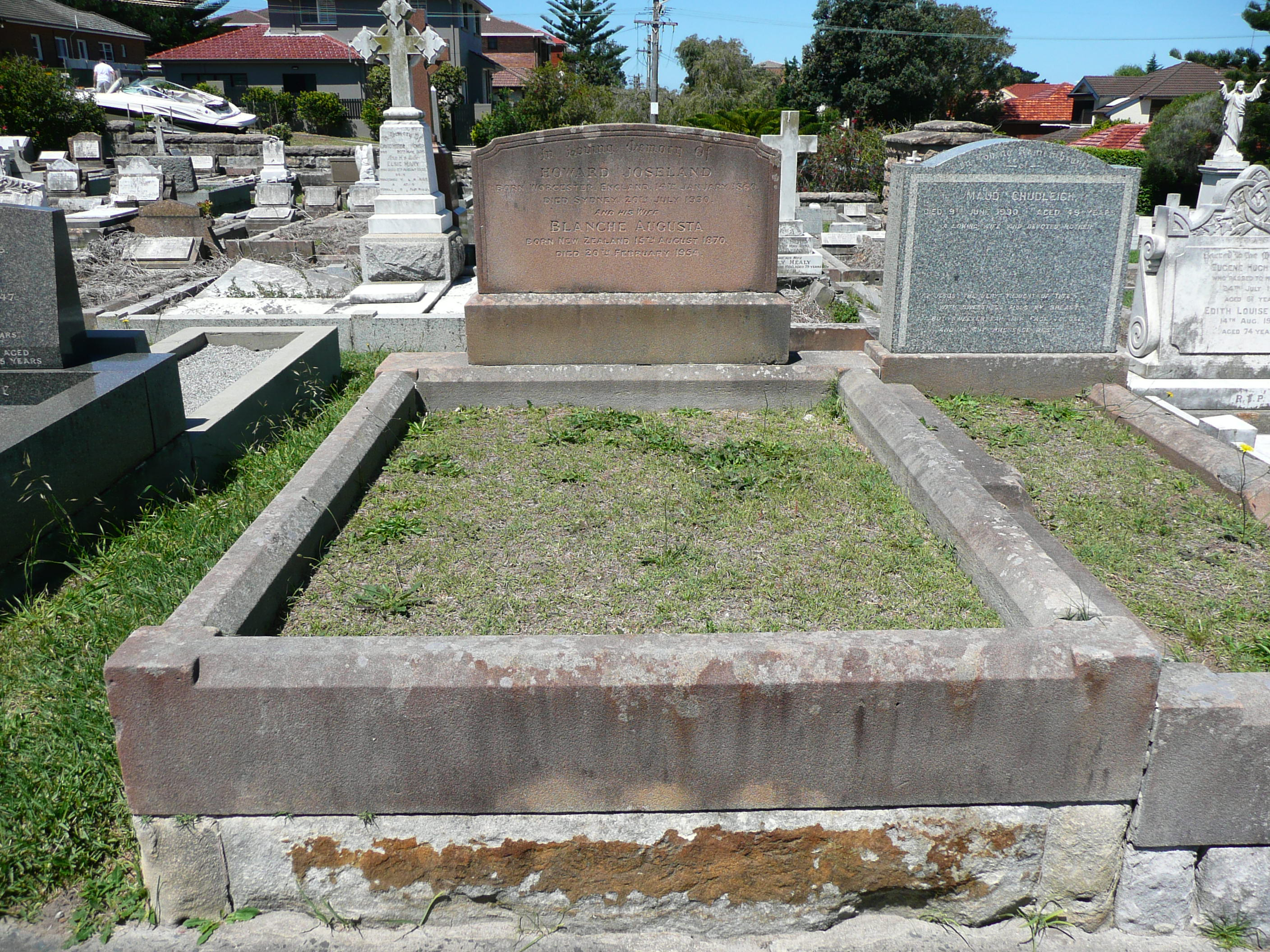
Joseland's grave at South Head Cemetery

== Sample of Joseland buildings ==
- Craignairn, Burns Road, Wahroonga. Built for Walter Strang
- Eldinhope, Burns Road, Wahroonga. Designed for Florence Hooke circa 1900, became Eldinhope School for Girls in 1901
- Malvern, Burns Road. Joseland's own home.
- Midhope, Burns Road, Wahroonga. Built 1896 for Sir James Murdoch, then became St Edmund's School for Children with Special Needs
- Mount Alverna, Burns Road, Wahroonga. Built circa 1891 for ophthalmic surgeon Dr. Francis Antill Pockley, became Franciscan Order retreat 1950s–1980s
- Redleaf, Redleaf Avenue, Wahroonga. Built in 1899 for W.G. Parish in Queen Anne style, considered an important example of Joseland's work. Has Local Government Heritage listing
- Rippon Grange, Water Street, Wahroonga. Designed with John Sulman circa 1898 in the Arts and Crafts style, for Frederick Sargood. Joseland and Vernon were commissioned to design the garden of one hectare.
- Westholme, Water Street, Wahroonga. Designed in Arts and Crafts style for John Bennett, built 1894.
- Paterson, Reid and Bruce Building, York Street, Sydney. Impressive commercial building in brick and sandstone, designed with Vernon, listed on Register of the National Estate.
- David Berry Hospital
- Lynburn Princes Highway Bomaderry. Built 1895 by George Muller for the widow of Henry Morton, manager of the David Berry Estate near Nowra, and Mayor of Numbaa 1868 to 1895. Still lived in by the Morton Family and coming up for 'auction 1 February 2014'
- Illowra Princes Highway Bomaderry NSW, Built in 1906 for Mark F Morton. member for Willondilly in the NSW legislative assembly 1901 till 1938
- Mananga (believed to have been designed by Joseland), Princes Highway Berry NSW. Built 1894 for the Stuart Family by Hohn Hay who was the manager of Alexander Berrys Coolngatta estate.

== Sources ==
- Edwards, Zeny (1998). Six of the best : architects of Ku-ring-gai. ISBN 978-0-646-36687-6.
- Apperly, Richard; Irving, Robert; Reynolds, Peter (1989). A pictorial guide to identifying Australian architecture : styles and forms from 1788 to the present. Angus & Robertson in association with Mead & Beckett. ISBN 978-0-207-16201-5.
