= Berry Museum =

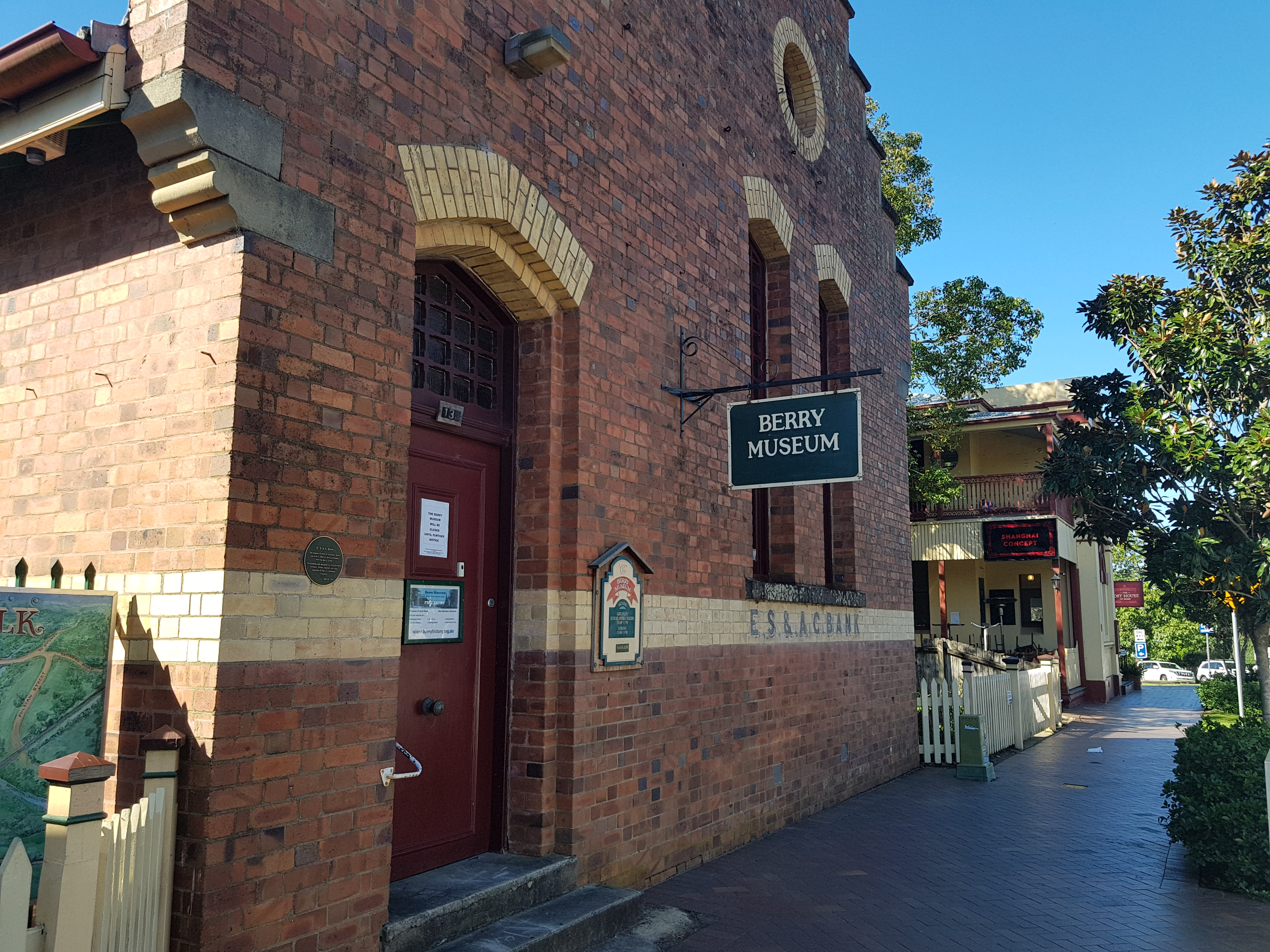
- Berry Museum entrance

- Location within New South Wales Location within Australia
- 34.7751°S 150.6986°E
- Location: 135 Queen Street, Berry, City of Shoalhaven, New South Wales, Australia

History
- Built: 1884–1885

Site notes
- Architect: William Wilkinson Wardell
- Owner: Shoalhaven City Council

New South Wales Heritage Register
- Official name: Berry Museum; ES&A; Bank; E.S.& A; ANZ Bank; English; Scottish & Australian Bank
- Type: state heritage (built)
- Designated: 1 September 2006
- Reference no.: 1755
- Type: Bank
- Category: Commercial
- Builders: W. Stoddart

Berry Museum is a heritage-listed former council chambers and bank building and now museum at 135 Queen Street, Berry in the South Coast region of New South Wales, Australia. It was designed by William Wilkinson Wardell and built from 1884 to 1885 by W. Stoddart. It is also known as the E.S.&A. Bank or the ANZ Bank. The property is owned by Shoalhaven City Council. It was added to the New South Wales State Heritage Register on 1 September 2006.

== History ==
The English, Scottish and Australian Banking company commenced business in Broughton Creek in June 1875. It was the second branch on the coast and the third in New South Wales. On 8 March 1884 the E.S.& A. bank purchased the land on which the building now stands for the purpose of erecting a new bank building. The architect for the new bank building was William Wilkinson Wardell.

Wardell was born in England in 1824 and became a distinguished designer of churches in his homeland before he moved to Melbourne in 1857. Here, in his position as inspector general of public works in Victoria, he prepared designs for many public buildings including St Paul's Cathedral, the Melbourne Mint and Customs House, and the English Scottish and Australian Bank in Collins St Melbourne. Wardell later moved to Sydney where he worked as an architect for the remainder of his life. Wardell died in 1899. Wardell designed St Mary's Cathedral, Sydney as well as St John's College at the University of Sydney. Whilst living in NSW he was commissioned to design a number of bank buildings for then E.S.& A Bank. Berry Museum is the only surviving bank building of a group of 5 suburban and regional branches of the E.S. & A Bank in NSW designed by William Wilkinson Wardell with a north European architectural influence.

The E.S & A Bank in Berry traded through the last years of the 19th century and up until 1942, when it closed its Berry branch. In June of that year the Municipality of Berry purchased the property from the bank for £1,200. From 1943 to 1948 the premises served as the council chambers and the Town Clerk, Henry Stenning, occupied the residence. In 1948 the Shoalhaven Shire Council was formed by the amalgamation of several councils including Berry, with all assets being transferred to Shoalhaven. Mr Stenning was not employed by the new council but continued to rent the residence until 1950. Shoalhaven Shire Council leased the premises back to the E.S.& A bank when it re-opened in 1951. Alterations in 1951 included the removal of two fireplaces, alteration to the manager's office, addition of toilets to rear verandah of the Bank, and a bathroom and kitchen upgrade.

In 1969 the E.S. & A. Bank merged with the ANZ Bank and the bank operated out of the Wardell building until December 1972 when the branch ceased trading. In 1970, the building underwent external and internal renovation, including replacing the slate roof with tiles.

In October 1975 the Berry Museum sub-rented the banking section of the property from the A.N.Z. bank with the assistance of the Shoalhaven Shire Council in meeting the cost of the rent. When the bank's lease ended in 1978 the area rented to the museum was enlarged and an out-door display set up. In 1983 the residence portion of the building was vacated and the Shoalhaven City Council agreed to rent the entire building and grounds to the Berry and District Historical Society providing an admirable setting for the museum.

== Description ==
The Berry Museum is a single storey brick building in the Scottish Baronial style with a stepped gable facade. The gable parapet is capped with stone and surmounted by a spherical finial. The parapet at is supported at the corners of the building by a stone corbel and a circular louvre windows placed in the centre of the gable.

The lintels over the windows and entrance are constructed in light coloured brickwork while the fanlight and upper half of the windows feature painted lattice work. There are verandahs on the western and eastern sides. The roof is tiled with manganese colour French pattern terracotta tiles that replaced the original slate roof. A white picket fence flanks the building. There is a grassed driveway on the eastern side and a small garden on the western side, which gives access to the front door of the residence.

The building was reported to be in an excellent and largely original condition as at 28 July 2005.

The building is remarkably intact and retains much of its original fabric. In spite of past renovations, the legibility of the spaces remains clear. The modifications in the bathroom and kitchen demonstrate improvement in living standards and domestic technology during the 90 years of residential occupation. The banking chamber throughout all the years continues to be the initial point of contact with the public.

== Heritage listing ==
The Berry Museum, former E.S. & A Bank building, is of State Heritage significance through association as it was designed in 1884 by the prominent Victorian architect William Wilkinson Wardell. The building is an aesthetically distinctive building designed in the Victorian Gothic or Scottish Baronial style and provides a significant landmark in the township of Berry. The architectural style and detail of the building clearly expresses Wardell's design philosophy and provides an important research resource relating to late Victorian period architecture. Its heritage significance at a State level is enhanced by the rarity of the item, it is one surviving example of Wardell's suburban and regional Banks, built in the small scale with Northern European architectural influences. As such it is a benchmark example which demonstrates the principal characteristics of this group of five buildings characterised by the warmth and domesticity of architectural design and scale.

Berry Museum was listed on the New South Wales State Heritage Register on 1 September 2006 having satisfied the following criteria.

The place has a strong or special association with a person, or group of persons, of importance of cultural or natural history of New South Wales's history.

The Berry Museum, former E.S. & A Bank building, is of State heritage significance as one of the few remaining smaller scale buildings of the noted architect William Wardell. The building is a complete and intact record of interior spaces, detail joinery and style of architecture, which is distinctively identified as the work of this architect.

Wardell was notable for his work in Victoria designing public buildings such as St. Patrick's Cathedral, Government House the Royal Mint and the Customs House. In New South Wales his works included St Mary's Cathedral, St John's College at Sydney University, the NSW Club and the old M.L.C. offices. He did extensive work for the E.S.A. bank including their head office in Collins St. in Melbourne. Berry Museum, former E.S. & A bank building is the only surviving bank of a group of five suburban E. S. & A Bank buildings which were designed by Wardell with a Northern European Architectural influence.

The place is important in demonstrating aesthetic characteristics and/or a high degree of creative or technical achievement in New South Wales.

The Berry Museum, former E.S. & A Bank building, is of State heritage significance as an aesthetically distinctive building in the Victorian Gothic style so well executed by the architect William Wilkinson Wardell. The facade expresses the heritage of the E.S.& A. Bank through the distinctive detailing of the stepped ramparts, reminiscent of the medieval castles and grand houses of Scotland. The work of William Wardell is apparent throughout the external design of the building especially in the use of asymmetry in the front stepped gable. Aspects of the interior are also highly significant components of the building. The more important interior spaces are in original condition and retain considerable charm and design quality. The building is a fine example of late Victorian architecture and remains a most significant element in the streetscape, and the facade is visible on approach from the east and west approaches along Queen St.

The place has strong or special association with a particular community or cultural group in New South Wales for social, cultural or spiritual reasons.

The bank has local heritage significance as it was one of three major banks represented in the town. It was the first building in the town to be designed by a prominent architect. (Berry and District Historical Society) Together with the Post Office adjacent, this group was the centre of commercial and business activity during the period of growth of the town following freehold sale of the Berry Estate.

The building continues an important role for the community as the Berry Museum and headquarters of the Berry and District Historical Society. The museum display has established a centre of considerable tourist interest and is an important resource for local history research. An excellent collection of Aboriginal family and cultural history has been established at the museum with the assistance of aboriginal elders and serves as a reference centre.

The place has potential to yield information that will contribute to an understanding of the cultural or natural history of New South Wales.

The former E.S.& A. bank is of State heritage significance as an outstanding work of the architecture of the prominent architect William Wilkinson Wardell from the late Victorian period.. The strong stylistic quality and resolution of the design and detailing proclaim this building as the work of an extraordinary architect. Wardell's design philosophy is clearly expressed in all aspects of the fabric of the building, which remains intact and legible to this day.

The place possesses uncommon, rare or endangered aspects of the cultural or natural history of New South Wales.

The building is rare as the only surviving example of Wardell's prolific E.S.& A Bank commissions in suburban and regional context to have survived to present day in N.S.W. It is also a rare example a Wardell building built to a more warm and domestic style and scale than many of this other commissions.

The place is important in demonstrating the principal characteristics of a class of cultural or natural places/environments in New South Wales.

The museum is of state heritage significance as a fine example of bank design of the Victorian period. As one of a group of five suburban and regional Bank buildings, it demonstrates the principal characteristics of this group which is characterised by the warmth and domesticity of style usually associated with the Arts and Crafts movement. As such it represents a significant variation to the imposing classical edifices that were usually built by banks in the Victorian period.
