= David Berry (landowner) =

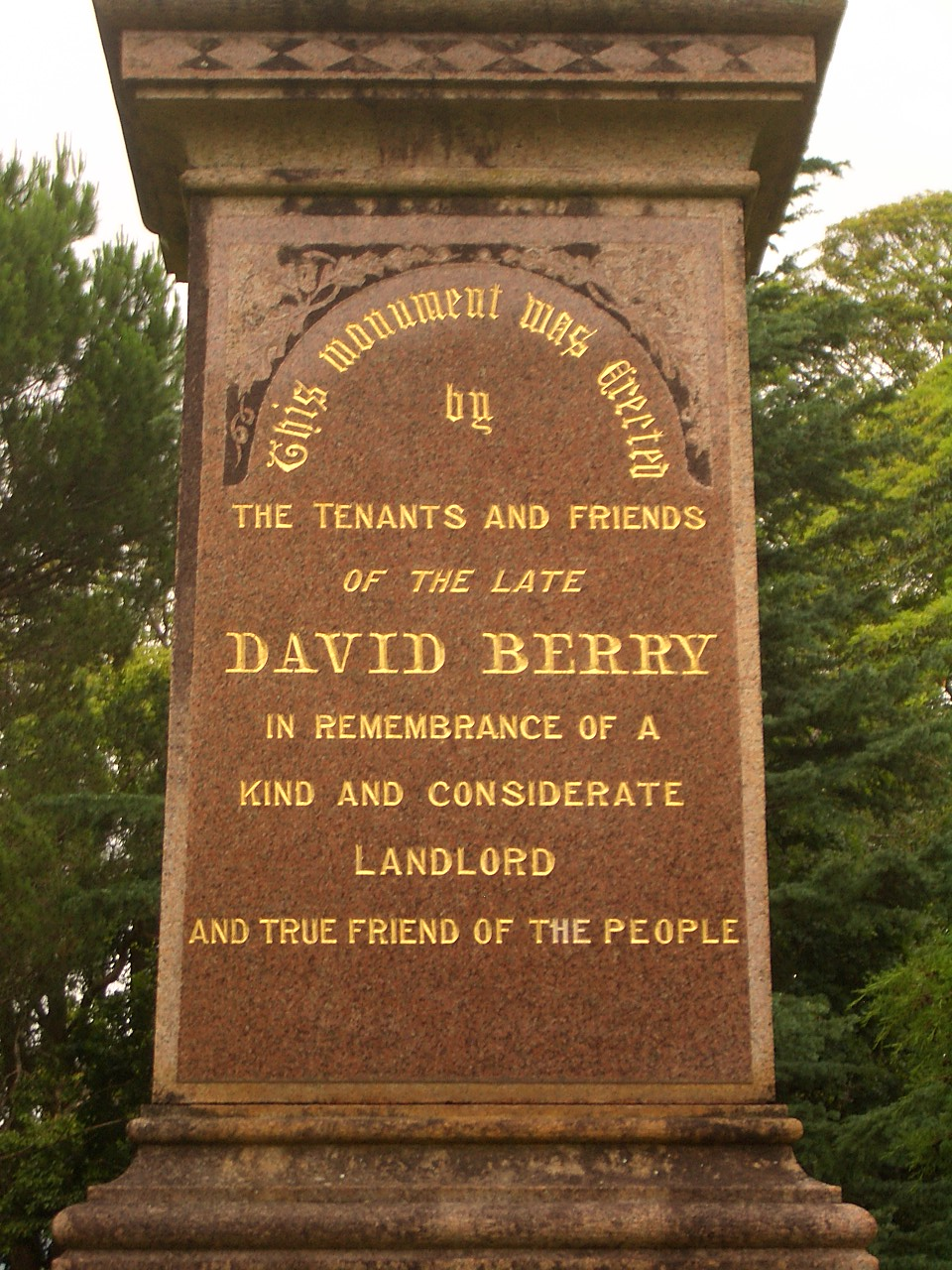
Monument to Berry in Berry, New South Wales

David Berry (December 1795 – 23 September 1889) was a Scottish-born horse and cattle breeder, landowner and benefactor in colonial New South Wales.

Berry was the eighth of nine children born to James Berrie (died 1827) and his wife Isabel Tod (died 1830) and was baptised 29 December 1795. Alexander Berry was his eldest brother.

Berry was born at Cupar, Fife, Scotland, and was educated at the University of St Andrews. He arrived in New South Wales on board the Midlothian in July 1836, and proceeded to the estate of his elder brother, Dr. Alexander Berry, at Coolangatta Estate, which he managed in conjunction with another brother, John, for eleven years, and after the latter's death carried on the concern alone until 1873, when Dr. Alexander Berry died and devised the whole of his property to his brother David, who followed the system of cultivating and fencing a large portion of his land whilst the remainder was leased out in farms of varying size on peculiar and unusually profitable terms. Mr. Berry died, at the age of ninety-three, on 23 September 1889, and by his will bequeathed £100,000 to his alma mater, St. Andrews University, and a like sum to found a hospital in the Shoalhaven district of New South Wales.
