= Coolangatta, New South Wales =

Coolangatta New South Wales
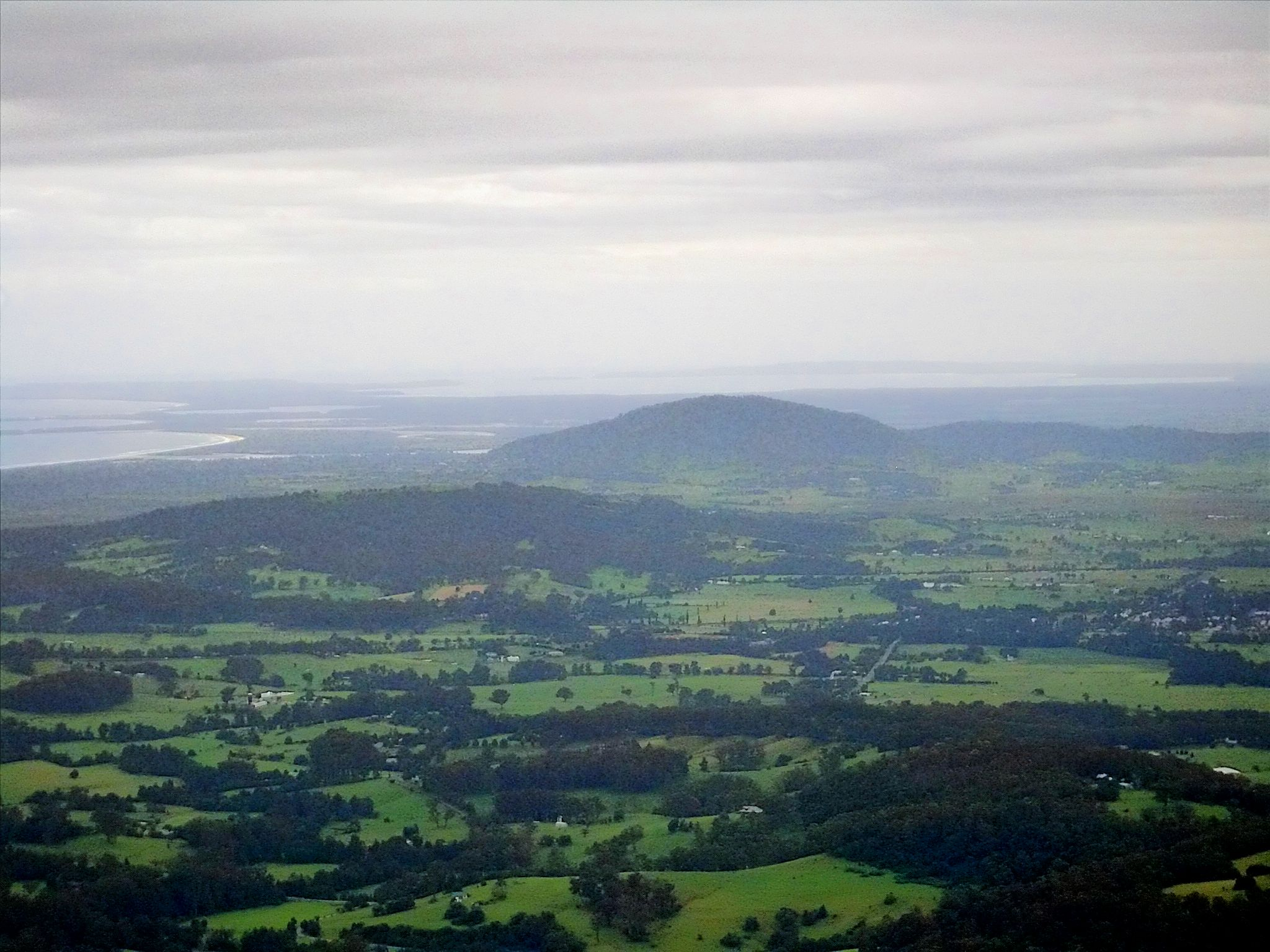
- A view of Coolangatta Mountain and Jervis Bay (in the background) from the Drawing Room Rocks area. The land around the mountain is in Shoalhaven LGA; this includes the small town of Berry (right front)

- Coordinates: 34°51′S 150°43′E)
- Population: 329 (2016 census)
- Postcode(s): 2535
- Elevation: 12 m (39 ft)
- Location: 151 km (94 mi) S of Sydney CBD; 16 km (10 mi) NE of Nowra; 4 km (2 mi) W of Shoalhaven Heads
- LGA(s): City of Shoalhaven
- County: Camden
- Parish: Coolangatta
- State electorate(s): Kiama
- Federal division(s): Gilmore
Localities around Coolangatta:
| Far Meadow | Berry | Berry |
| Back Forest | Coolangatta | Shoalhaven Heads |
| Numbaa | Numbaa | Comerong Island |

Coolangatta is an historic area in Australia, on the north shore of the Shoalhaven River on the New South Wales south coast.

== History ==
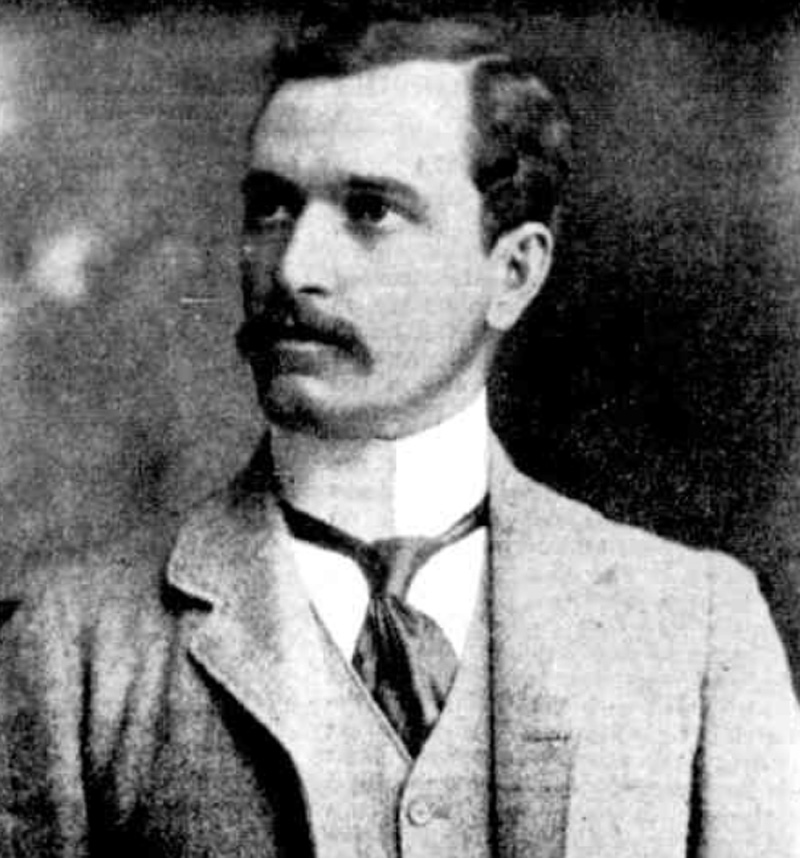
Alexander Hay, circ 1896, owner of Coolangatta Estate on the Shoalhaven River from 1909 to 1941

Cullunghutti is a Jerrinja word meaning "splendid view". Behind the settlement is a tall hill known as Coolangatta Mountain. In 1822 Scotsman Alexander Berry settled and built an estate (Coolangatta Estate) in the area, he was the first European to settle in the Shoalhaven area. In 1846 the brigantine ship Coolangatta, named by Berry for his estate, was wrecked on what is today Queensland's Gold Coast. It's from that ship that the better known Coolangatta, Queensland gets its name.
