= Alexander Berry =

British colonist of New South Wales

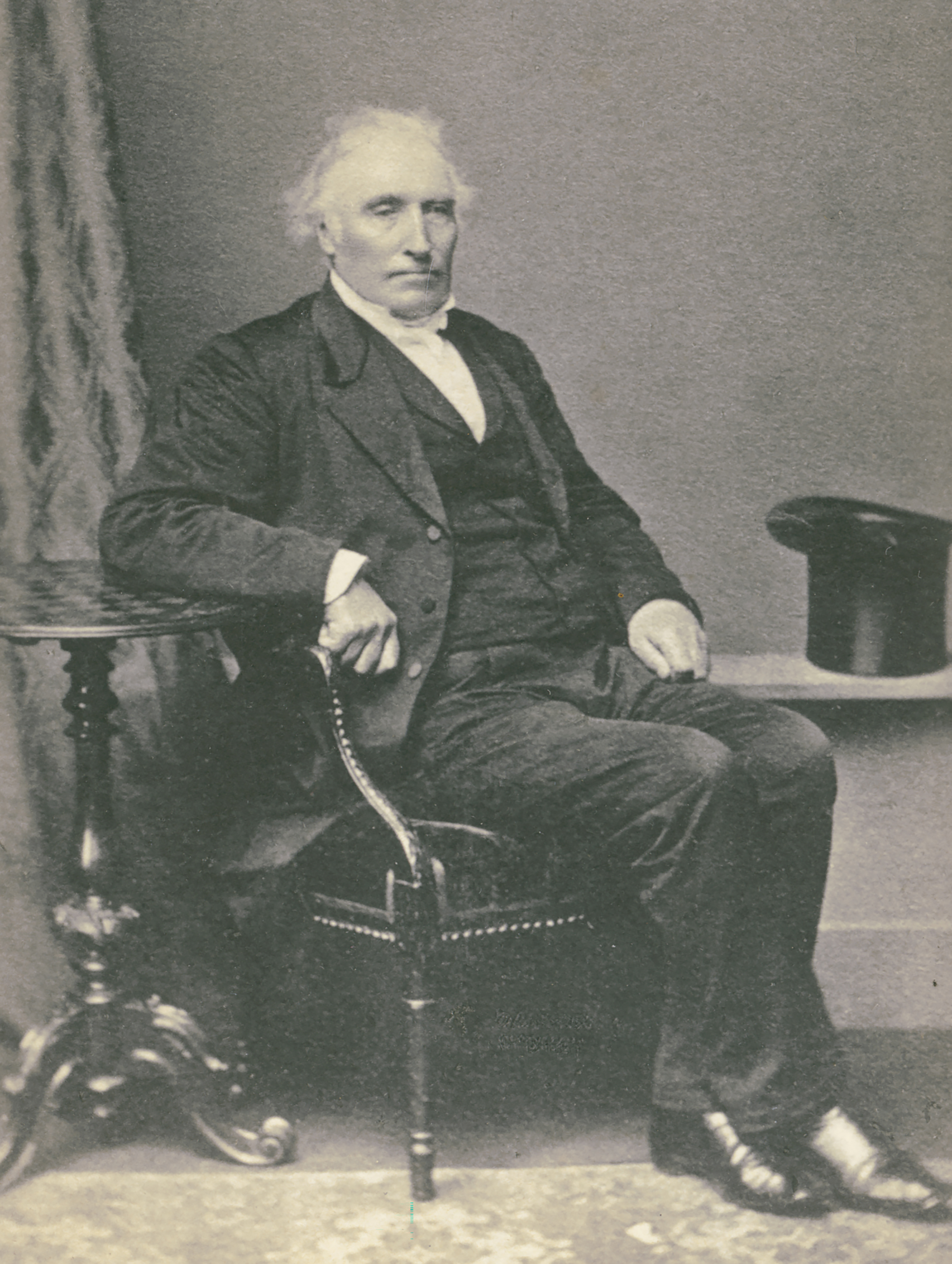
- Berry, c. 1856
- Born: 30 November 1781; Hilltarvit Mains Farmhouse, Cupar, Fife, Scotland
- Died: 17 September 1873 (aged 91); Crows Nest, New South Wales
- Citizenship: British Empire
- Known for: British merchant and landowner in the colony of New South Wales

Alexander Berry (30 November 1781 – 17 September 1873) was a Scottish-born colonist and merchant who, in 1822, was given a large land grant of 10,000 acres (40 km^{2}) with 100 convicts to establish an estate on the south coast of New South Wales, Australia.

This land grant was the Coolangatta Estate, which has now developed into the area known as the Shoalhaven Region that includes the modern-day towns of Berry (named in honour of Alexander and his brother David), Gerringong, Bomaderry and Nowra.

Berry also came into possession of another significant land grant on the north shore of Sydney, called Crows Nest.

He was one of the wealthiest and largest landholders in colonial New South Wales. Berry was notable for his antiquated views on society and for his establishment of a feudal-like system of tenancy on his estates.

== Early life ==
Berry was born to parents James Berry and Isabel Tod at Hilltarvit Mains farmhouse, near Cupar in Fife, Scotland where his father was a tenant, during a blinding snowstorm on the evening of 30 November 1781 (St Andrew's Day, the national day of Scotland). He was baptised on 6 December. He was one of nine siblings.

Berry was educated at Cupar grammar school, where he was a contemporary of the artist Sir David Wilkie, and later studied medicine at St Andrews University from 1796 until 1798 and the University of Edinburgh from 1798 to 1801. His youthful intentions were to join the Royal Navy, but he was dissuaded from doing so by his father, and he became a surgeon's mate for the East India Company instead.

Ship's surgeons were permitted to take a substantial amount of cargo, so his responsibilities were both medical and mercantile. He travelled first to China and then to India, aboard the Lord Hawkesbury. The second voyage was profitable for Berry.

He decided to quit the medical profession, as he hated the whippings he was obliged to attend, and was also attracted to the commercial possibilities of shipping.

== Voyage of the City of Edinburgh ==
His first commercial voyage for profit was to the Cape of Good Hope in 1806. On arrival, he heard that New South Wales needed provisions. He purchased a ship, City of Edinburgh, with medical student Francis Shortt, to take provisions to the colony. While travelling as supercargo, he encountered storms which damaged his ship, so he stopped in Tasmania at Port Dalrymple, close to modern day Launceston. He sold half his provisions there and the remainder in Hobart. He then continued to Sydney, where he arrived on 13 January 1808 with only spirits remaining to sell.

=== Business dealings with the New South Wales Rum Corps ===
Upon arrival in Sydney, Berry became acquainted with the officers of the Rum Corps, who were running a cartel on trade into the colony of New South Wales. He allotted his cargo of 22,000 gallons of spirits to them and dined with their leaders, Captain John Macarthur and Major George Johnston. He did not interfere when they conducted the Rum Rebellion, where the Rum Corps mutinied and detained the Governor of New South Wales, William Bligh, which occurred while Berry was in Sydney. In return, Berry was offered a £2,000 contract by the officers to transport settlers and convicts from Norfolk Island to Van Diemen's Land. Although Berry completed the job, he demanded £3,600 for it and refused to accept a lesser payment in cash. Berry then decided to go to Fiji to obtain a cargo of sandalwood. Even though he was taken as a hostage by chief at Taveuni, he was later released and able to acquire 50 tonnes of sandalwood.

=== Rescuing survivors of the Boyd massacre ===
In 1809, Berry sailed from Fiji and stopped at the Bay of Islands in New Zealand to load a cargo of spars. News came through of the massacre of the crew and passengers of the ship Boyd by local Māori at nearby Whangaroa. The City of Edinburgh, with Berry, set sail for Whangaroa, where he rescued four survivors and the ship's papers by holding two chiefs hostage. He wrote in a letter to Governor Macquarie that he released the chiefs because "there was no opportunity of sending the chiefs to Port Jackson" (i.e. Sydney). He wrote in the Edinburgh Magazine that he had released them on condition that they lose their rank with their people, although he never expected that to happen.

=== Shipwreck of the City of Edinburgh ===
Berry sailed eastwards from New Zealand with his cargo to the Cape of Good Hope, however a broken rudder forced him to make repairs in Valparaíso, and then travel to Lima. He found a buyer for his cargo, and secured another cargo from Guayaquil for Cádiz and began the journey in 1811. After calling in at Rio de Janeiro Berry was forced to abandon the City of Edinburgh during storms near the Azores. He made his way to Lisbon, Portugal. It was on the trip from Lisbon to Cádiz that he met the English businessman Edward Wollstonecraft.

=== Partnership with Edward Wollstonecraft ===
Wollstonecraft proceeded to London as Berry's agent, and Berry remained for a time in Cádiz before also proceeding to London. Berry set up a partnership with Wollstonecraft (Berry and Wollstonecraft) and they decided to become merchants in New South Wales.

Berry's early business partner in the vessel City of Edinburgh, Francis Shortt, claimed that Berry's partnership with Wollstonecraft was invalid. Shortt had been declared insolvent and died in 1828 before the case was settled.

== Merchant and Colonist in New South Wales ==
They sailed to Sydney in 1819. Berry sailed as supercargo aboard Admiral Cockburn, leaving England January 1819, and arriving in Sydney in July. He was shortly followed by Wollstonecraft aboard the Canada. They set up as merchants on George Street in The Rocks area. Berry utilised his old Rum Corps connections to make Captain John Piper (who was the current chief of customs in Sydney) his agent.

Berry began to plan a trip to England to expand their commercial connections and returned there aboard Admiral Cockburn in February 1820. Wollstonecraft obtained a land grant on Sydney's Lower North Shore in Berry's absence, which he named Crow's Nest.

While in London, Berry was informed that a land grant in New South Wales had been given to him by Governor Lachlan Macquarie. He subsequently chartered the Royal George and returned to Sydney in November 1821 with an "extensive assortment of merchandise" for sale at their George Street store. Significantly for Berry's business dealings, also aboard this ship was the new governor of New South Wales, Thomas Brisbane with his staff and family. Arriving in Sydney with the new governor, Berry began the search for ideal land to claim his grant.

In early 1822, Berry went with Hamilton Hume and Lieutenant Robert Johnson on a journey of exploration down the coast of New South Wales aboard the Snapper. During the journey he investigated the land in Shoalhaven area and decided to lay claim to it. He returned to Sydney and applied for a grant of 10,000 acres. The British colonial policy at that time heavily favoured wealthy "respectable emigrants" and the Berry and Wollstonecraft partnership were duly granted 10,000 acres (40 km^{2}) by Governor Brisbane with 100 convicts free of charge to labour for them.

=== Establishing the Coolangatta Estate ===
In June 1822, Berry and Wollstonecraft purchased a small cutter, the Blanche, and Berry returned to the Shoalhaven with Hume and assigned servants (convicts) to develop his land grant there.

While attempting to cross the bar into the river in a small boat, two people drowned, including Davison, who was the boy that Berry had rescued from the 'Boyd'. Given the danger, Berry arranged to drag the Blanche across a swamp that separated the Shoalhaven River from the Crookhaven River, with the Crookhaven entrance offering a safer passage. In order to provide safe boat access, Berry had Hamilton Hume to oversee his convicts dig a canal through the swamp using only hand tools. The convict labourers cut a 209-yard canal linking the Shoalhaven River to the Crookhaven River in four weeks and in doing so, constructed the first land navigable canal in Australia.

Berry named and established the Shoalhaven land grant as the Coolangatta Estate, while Wollstonecraft stayed in Sydney to look after business there. The name Coolangatta is derived from the local Dharawal word, Cullunghutti, which describes the dominant mountain in the area. Berry was able to conciliate with the resident Indigenous clans on his arrival, who became useful workers for him. A local Indigenous man, whom Berry assigned the name Broughton, was particularly important to Berry as a guide and interpreter during these early stages. Berry named Broughton Creek after him.

Around a dozen local Aboriginal men also became acquainted with John Batman, whose father had a contract felling cedar in the Shoalhaven. These men, such as Yunbai and Warroba, travelled with Batman to Sydney, Van Diemen's Land and the Port Phillip District, where they played integral roles in such things as roving parties against Aboriginal Tasmanians and in the Batman Treaty. Berry also became interested in collecting the remains of Aboriginal Tasmanians, and contracted Reverend Robert Knopwood of Hobart to send him at least two skulls.

Berry later secured two additional land grants in the Shoalhaven of 4,000 acres (16 km^{2}) each. Together with purchases, the size of the estate grew to 32,000 acres (130 km^{2}) in the early 1840s.

Berry used his convict labour to cut down the immense groves of cedar trees on his property, the timber products of which were transported and sold in Sydney for significant profit. In 1826 alone, 625,000 feet of timber was exported from Coolangatta. Convicts also drained the swamps to increase the size of his arable land which produced maize, tobacco, wheat, barley and potatoes. Cattle and pigs were also reared and shipped to the markets in Sydney. Berry and Wollstonecraft purchased vessels for this trade and had several ships built at Shoalhaven. The partners were also involved in exporting coal and seal-skins.

To ensure the compliance of the convicts and the Aboriginal population in the area, a small military detachment was sent to Coolangatta in 1825 where they were stationed for several years.

=== "The Laird of Shoalhaven" ===
In the late 1820s when the colony was under the reign of Governor Darling, Berry and Wollstonecraft appear to have obtained very favourable treatment by the introduction laws that gave their partnership a virtual monopoly in the cedar and tobacco trades.

When his business partner, Edward Wollstonecraft, died in 1832, the entire Coolangatta and Crows Nest estates passed to Alexander Berry, who had married Elizabeth Wollstonecraft, the sister of Edward, on 21 September 1827. The George Street stores had already shut in 1828, therefore Berry spent most of his time running the Coolangatta Estate. The enormous profits of the estate, which came mostly from the extraction and selling of cedarwood, were now solely controlled by Berry, who came to be described as "The Laird of Shoalhaven".

By 1836, at the age of 55, Berry decided to retire to his Crows Nest estate, which at that time covered hundreds of acres of prime Lower North Shore Sydney real estate, including what are now the modern suburbs of Waverton, Wollstonecraft and North Sydney. He left the on-the-ground management of Coolangatta to his brothers, David and John, whom Berry had strongly encouraged to migrate from Scotland. David ran the estate alone following John's death in 1848.

Although Berry now resided mostly in Sydney, he was still the owner of Coolangatta and maintained his authority in its operation. He was accused of mistreating his convict labourers by not providing adequate clothing and enforcing excessive floggings as punishment. However, many convicts remained at Coolangatta for decades indicating that his overall treatment of them was not severe.

By the end of the 1840s, convict transportation to New South Wales was coming to an end and so with it was Berry's supply of free labour. Berry tried importing cheap Chinese coolies, but ultimately decided upon turning his remaining convict labourers into tenant farmers by giving them clearing leases upon his land at Coolangatta. Through this system, Berry ultimately became the patron and landlord of around 300 tenants, who leased approximately 9,000 acres which earned him £6,000 in rent.

=== "The Shoalhaven Incubus" ===
Berry continued to buy up land in the Shoalhaven area to add to his Coolangatta Estate, and by the late 1850s he possessed most of the coastal plains from Werri Beach south to the Crookhaven River. This raised the ire of reformers who wanted to unlock this land for the benefit of the public. A reformist preacher, John Dunmore Lang, visited the region in 1858 and was outraged by what he saw as an "enormous wickedness" conducted by Berry, whom Lang designated as "The Shoalhaven Incubus".

Lang published an account of how Berry's leasing system reduced his tenants to "a miserable state of serfdom". For example, Berry would lease half an acre of land at £5 per annum for 4 or 7 years under terms where a house must be built, but at the conclusion of the lease, the improved property and the building reverted to ownership of Berry. Lang called these actions of Berry as "worthy of only a heartless and determined oppressor" and labelled Berry a "feudal lord".

Berry was angered by this account and had Lang sued for libel, but he was found not guilty. Berry was successful though in legal action against newspapers that printed Lang's essay. In an attempt to improve his image Berry arranged for his Shoalhaven tenants to put on a public display of affection for him. However, many of his tenants soon after voted against Berry's interests in municipal elections. Berry was outraged by these tenants and threatened to evict them en masse.

== Politics ==
Berry was appointed by Governor Darling as a member of the Legislative Council in 1828. He continued to be re-appointed by various governors for the next 33 years until his retirement in 1861. He was never an elected representative.

Berry was a strict social conservative, opposing all moves towards democracy or representative government. He held reformers in contempt, often labelling them "blackguards" or "ruffians". In return, as representative government in New South Wales became stronger despite Berry's efforts, he was generally regarded as antiquated and foolish by fellow parliamentarians.

Upon the establishment of local government in the Shoalhaven area, Berry was of the opinion that it was a "nefarious" outcome, saying:

"the poor country people seem to be a set of asses only fit to be the negroes or slaves of the town … I cannot help laughing at the absurdity of the abolition of negro slavery when I perceive the Country people of New South Wales anxious to become the White Negroes of the Jews and publicans of Towns and Villages. All the inhabitants of the Gerringong ward are the niggers of the people of Kiama"

Essentially Berry thought that only property-owning men should be allowed to govern themselves. In his view, country people were foolish for wanting local government, which would cause them to become oppressed servants of Jews and publicans (business owners), not unlike African-American slaves.

He refused to pay rates on his Shoalhaven Estate after the incorporation of a Shoalhaven Municipality, arguing that his property should not form part of the local government area. He was successful in his claim against the payments in the Supreme Court and in the subsequent Privy Council appeal brought by the Municipality.

William Charles Wentworth summarised Berry as someone who:

"...had been so long accustomed to get both land and labour for nothing, he felt a natural repugnance in beginning to pay for it now...Under this system he had acquired a princely state of 20,000 or 30,000 acres of land and had enjoyed the fruits of the labour of hundreds of convicts..."

Berry described the colonisation of Australia as "the cheapest conquest ever made by England".

== Later life ==
Alexander's wife, Elizabeth, died in 1845 aged 63, at the Priory; a house owned by George Barney, on what was part of the Crow's Nest estate, where they were living at the time. Alexander Berry thereupon donated the land for a cemetery to the Anglican Parish of St Leonards. It was to be St Thomas' Cemetery, Crows Nest, the first burial ground established on Sydney's North Shore.

Crow's Nest House was completed in 1850 and Alexander Berry lived there until his death.

Berry was a member of the Philosophical Society and a councillor on the Australian Philosophical Society. He was interested in Australian Aborigines and their skulls, as well as geology, publishing a paper "On the Geology of Part of the Coast of New South Wales". Berry had a substantial library of more than 2,000 books by the time he died.

In the early 1870s, just before his death, Berry wrote his memoirs which were published in 1912, entitled 'Reminiscences'. They chiefly describe his experiences onboard the City of Edinburgh, with only a short section covering his life in New South Wales. In particular, he describes in detail his relationships with the indigenous people of New Zealand and Fiji, and his experiences during the rescue at the scene of the Boyd massacre.

== Death and legacy ==
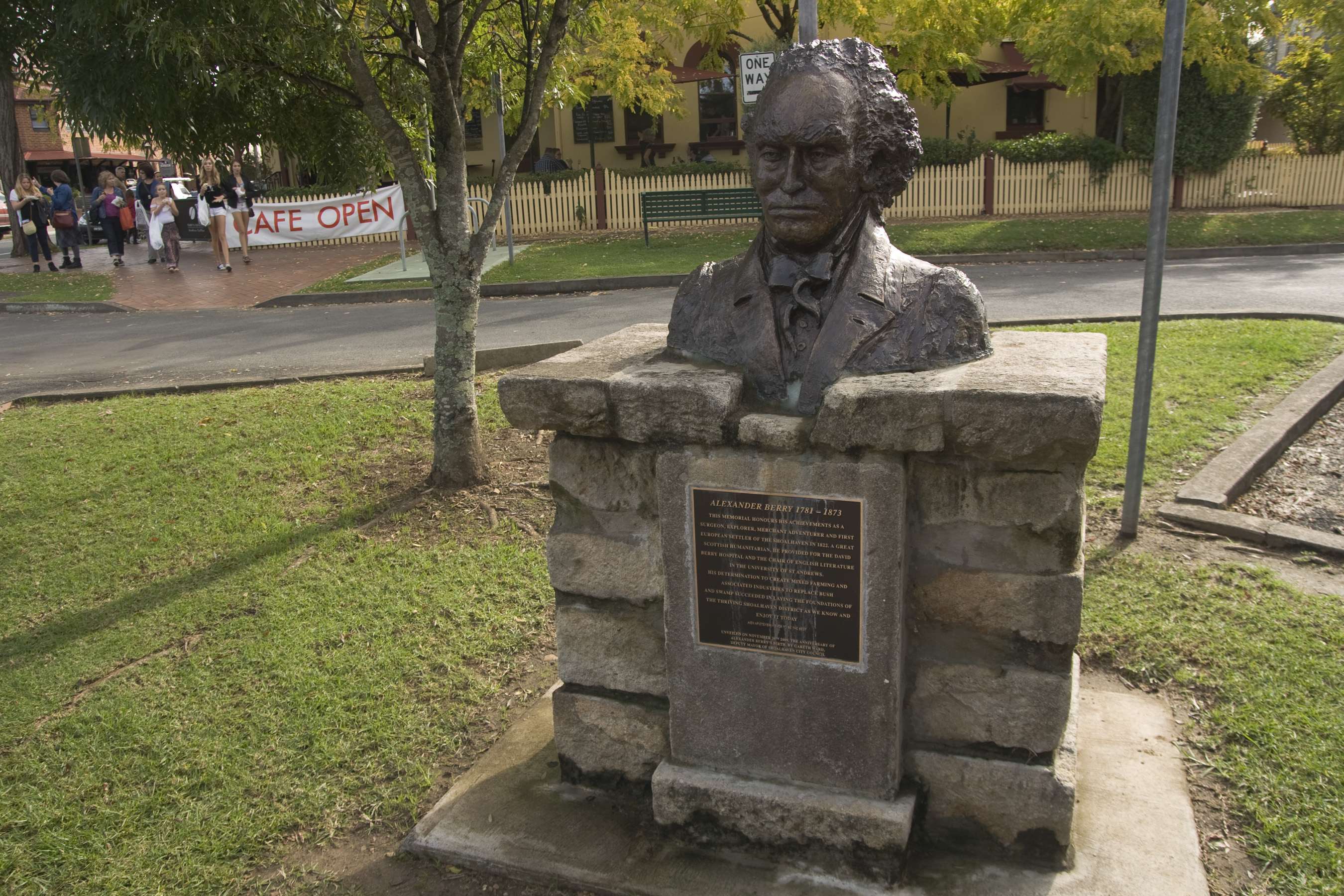
Alexander Berry monument at Berry, NSW, Australia

Alexander Berry died on 17 September 1873 aged 91, at Crows Nest House. He was buried in a family vault in St. Thomas' cemetery with his wife and Edward Wollstonecraft. The cemetery is now known as St Thomas Rest Park, and the graves are still present.

The probate value of Berry's estate was £400,000 sterling. He had prepared a will to bequeath the greater part of his estate to the University of St Andrews, but died a few hours before the time appointed to sign it. His fortune passed to his brother, David Berry, and when he died in 1889 the estate was worth £1,252,975 sterling. David fulfilled Alexander's desire by making a bequest to the University of St. Andrews in Scotland of £100,000. In 1889 St Andrews used the £100,000 legacy to establish the Berry Chair of English Literature, which still continues today. David was probably one of Australia's earliest millionaires.

After the death of Alexander and David Berry, the running of the Shoalhaven and Crows Nest interests passed to their cousin, Sir John Hay. Hay gradually sold off the estates but the feudal-like tenancy system established by Alexander Berry, which was the largest of its type in Australia, continued in the Shoalhaven region until around 1912. Extravagant festivals were arranged to celebrate the Berrys and Hay during this period, in which the tenants would erect triumphal arches in their honour and present lavish gifts to their landlord.

The New South Wales South Coast town of Berry was named after the brothers after their death. Berry Island and Berrys Bay near the present day suburb of Wollstonecraft, all part of the original Crows Nest estate, were named after Alexander Berry. Berry Street in North Sydney and Alexander Street in Crows Nest are also both named after him.

Berry's Canal, the small canal that was constructed under direction of Alexander Berry at the Coolangatta Estate to link the Shoalhaven River and the Crookhaven River now forms the main Shoalhaven River estuary, with the former entrance to the Shoalhaven River at Shoalhaven Heads usually closed to the ocean, except during floods.

The seaside resort town of Coolangatta, Queensland, is named after one of Berry's ships that was wrecked there in 1846.
