= Shoalhaven Heads =

Shoalhaven Heads New South Wales
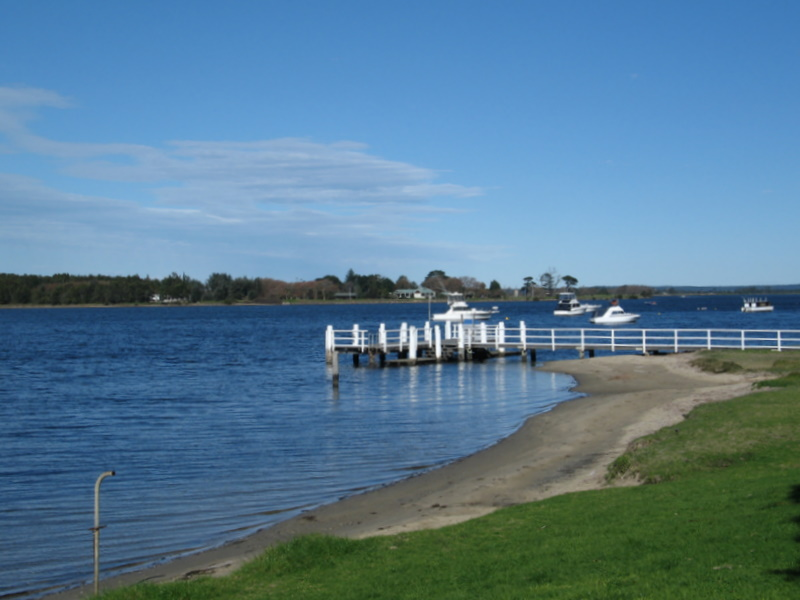
- Shoalhaven River

- Coordinates: 34°51′S 150°45′E
- Population: 3,059 (2016 census)
- Postcode(s): 2535
- Elevation: 10 m (33 ft)
- Time zone: AEST (UTC)
  - Summer (DST): AEST (UTC)
- Location: 149 km (93 mi) S of Sydney; 11 km (7 mi) S of Berry; 19 km (12 mi) ENE of Nowra
- LGA(s): City of Shoalhaven
- County: Camden
- Parish: Coolangatta
- State electorate(s): Kiama
- Federal division(s): Gilmore
Mean max temp	Mean min temp	Annual rainfall
21 °C; 70 °F	17.6 °C; 64 °F	1,261.5 mm 49.7 in
Localities around Shoalhaven Heads:
Berry	Berry
Coolangatta	Shoalhaven Heads	Tasman Sea
Coolangatta	Comerong Island

Shoalhaven Heads is a town in Shoalhaven, New South Wales, Australia. At the 2016 census, Shoalhaven Heads had a population of 3,059 people. It has a surfing beach, access to the Shoalhaven River and is surrounded by wineries.

== Geography ==
Shoalhaven Heads is a small rural holiday town. The town sits at the foot of Mount Coolangatta and is situated on both Seven Mile Beach and the mouth of the Shoalhaven River. It is served by the main Bolong Road, which runs from Gerroa to the north, to Bomaderry and Nowra to the south.

It is bounded by national park to the north, the Shoalhaven River to the south and farm land to the west. The town comprises family homes, weekenders and retirement homes.

== Population ==
In the 2016 Census, there were 3,059 people in Shoalhaven Heads. 78.8% of people were born in Australia. The next most common country of birth was England at 5.8%. 91.4% of people spoke only English at home. The most common responses for religion were No Religion 30.8%, Anglican 28.7% and Catholic 19.1%.

== Attractions ==
Shoalhaven Heads is near Coolangatta Estate, which was once the home of the pioneer Alexander Berry.
