= Berry and Wollstonecraft =

Australian business partnership

- Industry: Merchant Traders, Freight, Agricultural
- Founded: 1819
- Founder: Alexander Berry, Edward Wollstonecraft
- Headquarters: Sydney, Australia

Berry and Wollstonecraft was an Australian business partnership established in 1819 between Alexander Berry and Edward Wollstonecraft.

The main focus of the business was on a land grant of 10,000 acres (40 km^{2}), growing to 40,000 acres (162 km^{2}) in the Shoalhaven River area, where native cedar was felled for export, and other crops such as tobacco were grown both for sale in the colony of New South Wales and for export. Berry and Wollstonecraft's business relied heavily on convict labour.

Berry and Wollstonecraft had a warehouse in George Street, Sydney. Business in the city was administered primarily by Edward Wollstonecraft, while Alexander Berry took charge of the rural estate.
