= Edward Wollstonecraft =

Australian businessman (1783–1832)

- Born: 1783
- Died: 7 December 1832 (aged 48–49); Crows Nest, New South Wales
- Burial place: St Thomas Rest Park

Edward Wollstonecraft (UK: /ˈwʊlstənkrɑːft/ WUUL-stən-krahft, US: /-kræft/ -kraft; 1783 – 7 December 1832) was an Australian businessman in early colonial Australia, settling in what is now Sydney. He was the nephew of the early feminist Mary Wollstonecraft and cousin to Mary Wollstonecraft Shelley, the author of Frankenstein.

== Life ==
Edward Wollstonecraft was born to a London solicitor of the same name, the eldest brother of Mary Wollstonecraft. One of the reasons the young man sought to build a life away from England was to escape the notoriety which attached to his aunt, author of A Vindication of the Rights of Woman. In 1812, while travelling from Lisbon to Cádiz, he met Alexander Berry, with whom he later formed a trading partnership, intending to operate in the colony of New South Wales. The two men shared lodgings in Cádiz while the city was under siege; they also lived together in London from 1815 to 1819, with Wollstonecraft's sister Elizabeth as part of their household; the couple eventually married.

Wollstonecraft arrived in Sydney on board the ship Grenada on 31 August 1819. He received a land grant from Governor Lachlan Macquarie for 2,000 acres (8 km^{2}), 500 acres (2 km^{2}) of which were located on the north shore of Port Jackson running from what is now St Leonards to the foreshore. A warehouse was erected in George Street, Sydney, under the name of "Berry and Wollstonecraft".

In 1822, Wollstonecraft and Berry were granted 10,000 acres (40 km^{2}) of land on the Shoalhaven River (now the site of Coolangatta Estate) on the condition that they took responsibility for a hundred convicts. They built Australia's first canal there, with the assistance of Hamilton Hume and a party of convicts. The 209 yard long canal was completed in 12 days. The crops farmed at Shoalhaven included native cedar and tobacco, which were sold at considerable profit both to the growing colony at Sydney and for export. The property at Shoalhaven grew to 40,000 acres (162 km^{2}) under Berry's management, while Wollstonecraft looked after business in Sydney.

Edward Wollstonecraft was active in local affairs, and involved in a number of societies and organisations in the colony. These included the Philosophical Society of Australasia (now the Royal Society of New South Wales), of which he was a founding member, and the Royal Agricultural Society of New South Wales, serving as steward and secretary during the 1820s. In 1822, he was appointed senior director of the Bank of New South Wales and chairman of the first chamber of commerce. He was appointed Justice of the Peace in 1824.

== Death and legacy ==
Edward Wollstonecraft suffered ill health and died on 7 December 1832, aged 49. He was buried in the Sydney Burial Ground in Elizabeth Street. When his sister Elizabeth, Berry's wife, died, Berry constructed a tomb near St Thomas' Anglican Church, North Sydney, and Edward's remains were moved there. The tomb is still standing, and the graveyard of the church is now St Thomas' Rest Park.

The suburb of Wollstonecraft is named after him. He built a cottage on the north shore of Sydney Harbour in 1820 which he called Crows Nest. This later became the name of a larger house and estate on the same site. The suburb of Crows Nest is named after the house and estate.
