= Coolangatta Mountain =

Mountain in New South Wales, Australia

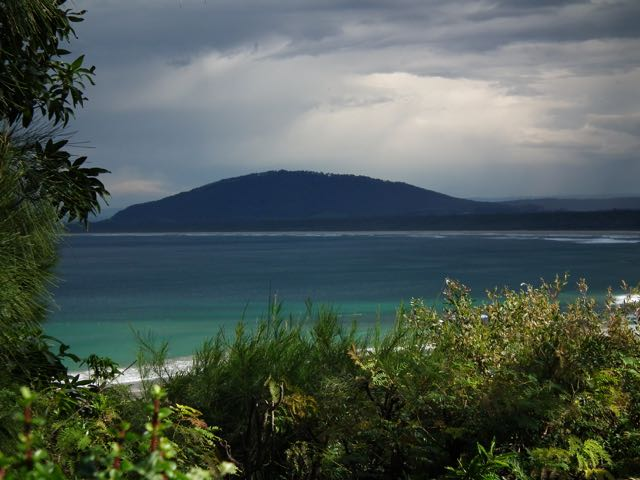
Coolangatta in 2017

Coolangatta Mountain, also known as Cullunghutti, is a small mountain rising from the Shoalhaven River Plain in New South Wales. It rises to about 300 metres above sea level and is not open to the public. It is covered in remnant bushland and is easily visible from Saddleback Mountain. It is named after an early settlement on the banks of the Shoalhaven known as Coolangatta and is only indirectly related to the better-known Coolangatta, Queensland.

== Protected status ==
The NSW National Parks & Wildlife Service undertook a cultural study of the area around Coolangatta Mountain in 2004, which documented the mountain's significance to Aboriginal peoples. In 2008, the Office of Environment & Heritage purchased a parcel of 67 hectares (170 acres) on its slopes after consulting with local Aboriginal representatives. This parcel was declared the Cullunghutti Aboriginal Area in 2011, under the National Parks and Wildlife Act 1974.

In April 2021, the Indigenous Land and Sea Corporation facilitated the acquisition of an adjacent 53.38 hectares (131.9 acres) by the Jerrinja Local Aboriginal Land Council, giving the council control over the access track leading to the summit of the mountain.
