= The Kiama Reporter and Illawarra Journal =

Front page, 10 August 1887

Front page, 4 January 1899

The Kiama Reporter and Illawarra Journal, also published as Kiama Reporter and The Reporter and Illawarra Journal, was a semi-weekly, then later a weekly English language newspaper published in Kiama, New South Wales, Australia.

== Newspaper history ==
The Kiama Reporter and Illawarra Journal was published from circa 1876-1878 until 1947. It was published under the title Kiama Reporter from 1886-1887 and The Reporter and Illawarra Journal from 1887–1894. The circulation was semi-weekly until 1920 when publication changed to weekly. In 1947 The Kiama Reporter and Illawarra Journal merged with The Kiama Independent and Shoalhaven Advertiser to form Kiama Independent.

== Digitisation ==
The Kiama Reporter and Illawarra Journal has been digitised as part of the Australian Newspapers Digitisation Program of the National Library of Australia.

== See also ==
- List of newspapers in Australia
- List of newspapers in New South Wales
