= Kiama Light =

Lighthouse in New South Wales, Australia

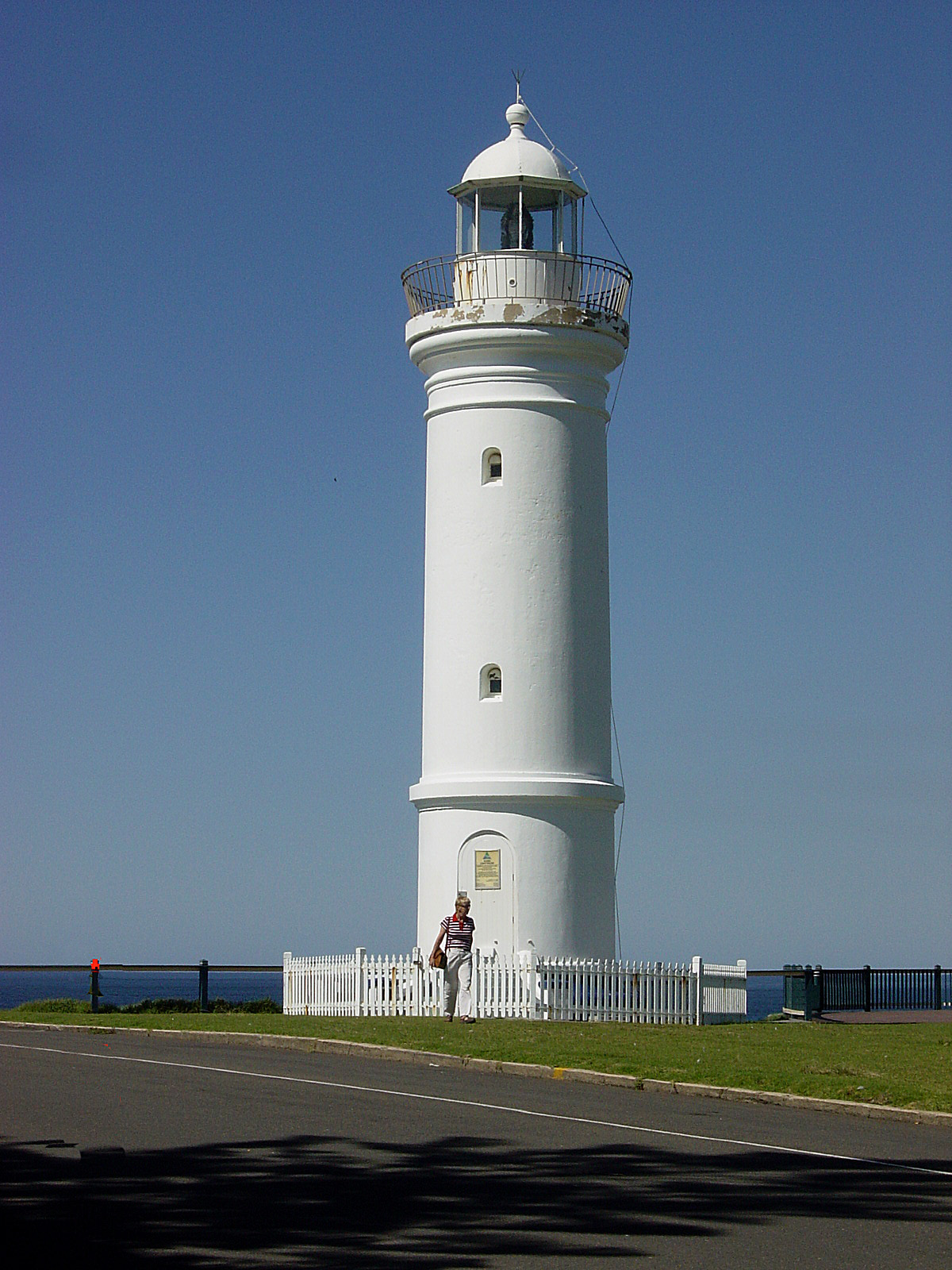
- Kiama Light
- Location: Kiama; New South Wales; Australia
- Coordinates: 34°40′18.58″S 150°51′45.47″E

Tower
- Constructed: 1887
- Foundation: concrete base
- Construction: concrete-clad brick tower
- Automated: 1920
- Height: 51 feet (16 m)
- Shape: cylindrical tower with balcony and lantern
- Markings: white tower and lantern
- Power source: mains electricity
- Operator: NSW Maritime

Light
- Focal height: 119 feet (36 m)
- Lens: 4th order Chance Brothers lens
- Intensity: 28,000 cd
- Range: 16 nautical miles (30 km; 18 mi)
- Characteristic: Fl (4) W 20s.

Kiama Light, also known as Kiama Harbour Light, is an active lighthouse in Kiama, New South Wales, Australia. The lighthouse is located close to the Kiama Blowhole on Blowhole Point, south of Kiama Harbour.

== History ==
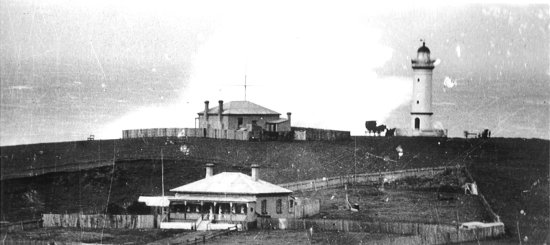
Kiama Light c. 1926 showing the principal and assistant keepers' houses.

Tenders for the construction of the tower were called in 1886, ten years after Robertson Basin, a man-made basin, was opened in Kiama Harbour. The tower was commissioned on 1 January 1887. It was designed by Edward Orpen Moriarty MA MInstCE.

The light was established in 1887. The original apparatus was an oil burner with a catadioptric fixed lens and light intensity of 600 cd. The characteristic was fixed green and it was visible for 9 nautical miles (17 km; 10 mi). Two houses were constructed, a principal lighthouse keeper's house close to the tower, and a one-story assistant keeper's house a bit further.

In 1908 the power source was upgraded to coal gas with an intensity of 1,500 cd and a range of 15 nautical miles (28 km; 17 mi).

A report from 1913 says that the light is unwatched and the keeper's house is empty, though officially the station was only demanned in 1920. According to records, in 1920 the light was further upgraded to acetylene gas carbide lamp, the characteristic was changed to a group flashing and the light was automated.

The principal keeper's house was destroyed by vandals soon after this, though the other cottage remained as it was the residence of the harbour pilots.

in the 1920s. The assistant keeper's house was used for many years as the pilot's cottage and now serves as a museum and a tourist information centre.

In 1969 the light was electrified and connected to mains electricity, with a 120 V battery bank as backup. The current light source is a 120 V, 1000 W, quartz halogen lamp.

== Structure ==
The foundation of the tower is a concrete slab, 14 feet (4.3 m) deep and 12 feet (3.7 m) in diameter.

The building is made of bricks, cemented outside and plastered within. Ascending the tower is done by three iron ladders leading from one storey to the next. The top of the structure is surrounded by an artistic railing.

The tower is surrounded by a hexagonal fence

== Site operation ==
The lighthouse is managed by Transport for NSW. The museum is managed by the Kiama Historical Society.

== Visiting ==
The site is accessible by road and parking is available. The museum is open on weekends, but the tower is closed to the public.

== See also ==
- List of lighthouses in Australia
