= Mitch Rein =

Australian rugby league footballer (born 1990)

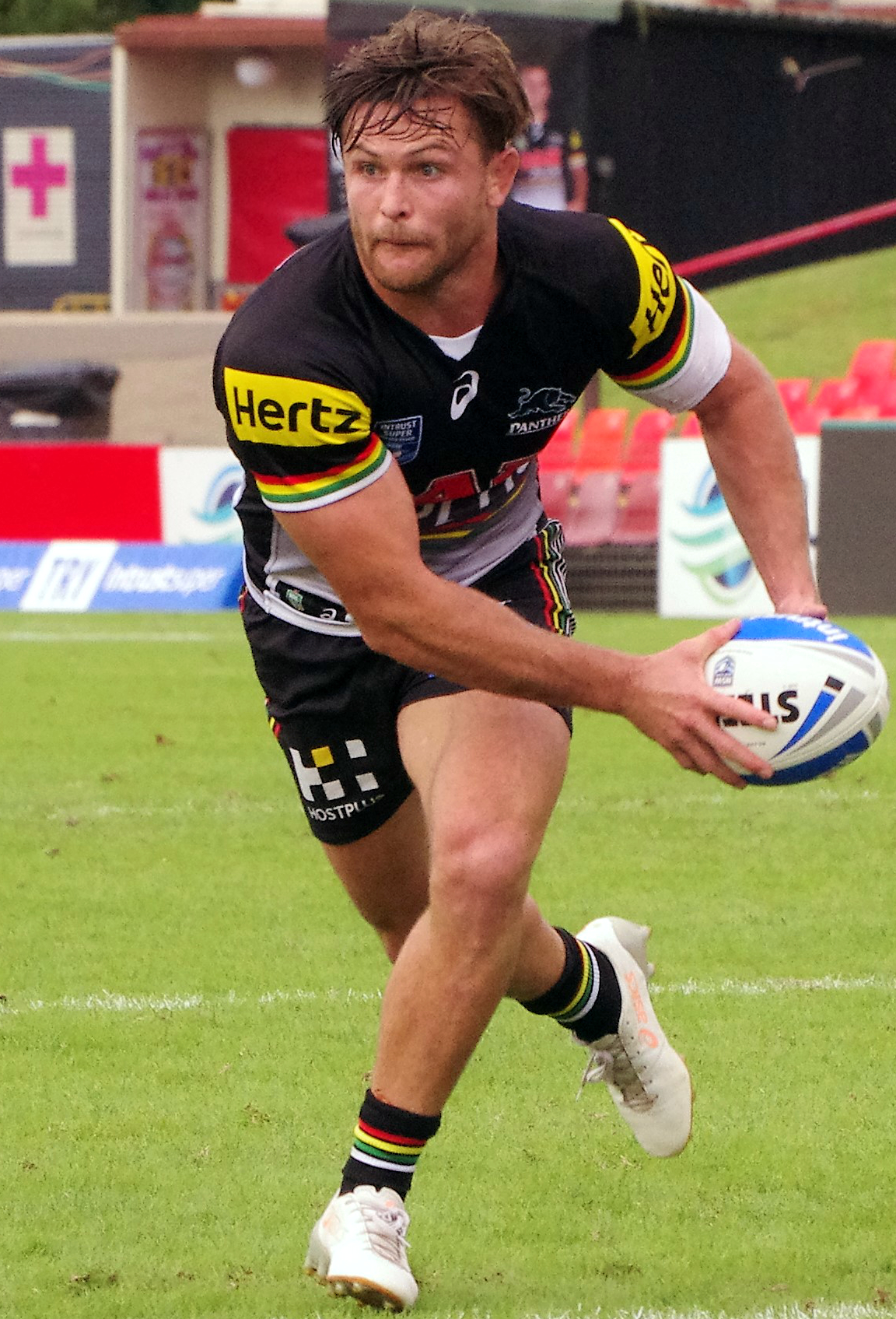

Personal information
- Full name: Mitchell Rein
- Born: 26 April 1990 (age 36) Kiama, New South Wales, Australia

Playing information
- Height: 176 cm (5 ft 9 in)
- Weight: 88 kg (13 st 12 lb)
- Position: Hooker
Club
Years	Team	Pld	T	G	FG	P
2011–16	St. George Illawarra	131	22	0	0	88
2017	Penrith Panthers	5	2	0	0	8
2018–21	Gold Coast Titans	71	8	0	0	32
2022	Parramatta Eels	2	0	0	0	0
	Total	209	32	0	0	128
Representative
Years	Team	Pld	T	G	FG	P
2014–15	NSW Country	2	0	0	0	0
2017	NSW Residents	1	0	0	0	0

Mitch Rein (born 26 April 1990) is a former Australian rugby league footballer who last played as a hooker for the Parramatta Eels in the National Rugby League (NRL).

Rein previously played for the Gold Coast, St. George Illawarra and Penrith in the NRL, and has played for NSW Country.

== Background ==
Rein was born in Kiama, New South Wales, Australia.

== Career ==
Rein began playing rugby league in his hometown of Kiama for the Kiama Knights, working his way up the junior ranks before signing for the Illawarra Steelers to play in their junior competitions, Harold Matthews Cup and S.G. Ball Cup. In 2006, Rein won the Steelers Harold Matthews Player of the Year. Rein then went on to sign with the St. George Illawarra Dragons and made impact with the Under-20's side in 2009 and 2010, winning the Dragons' Toyota Cup Player of the Year award in 2010.

Rein made his NRL first grade debut for the St. George Illawarra Dragons on 12 March 2011 at Skilled Park, Robina in Round 1 of the 2011 Telstra Premiership, when he came on for the final thirty minutes of their 25–16 win, making 18 tackles.

Rein played 132 National Rugby League games for the St. George Illawarra Dragons over six seasons.

After being told by the St. George club that his contract would not be extended past the 2016 NRL season, Rein signed a two-year contract with the Penrith Panthers on 28 October 2016.

Rein made his first grade debut for the Penrith club in their Round 13 38–0 win over the Canterbury Bankstown Bulldogs, with Rein scoring 2 tries. On 28 August 2017, Rein was named in the Intrust Super Premiership NSW team of the year. Rein was a member of The Penrith Panthers side that won the 2017 Intrust Super Premiership NSW and The 2017 NRL State Championship. Stuck behind Peter Wallace and Sione Katoa in the Penrith pecking order for hooker, Rein just played five NRL games for the season, and left the club at the end of the year, signing with the Gold Coast Titans, Rein joins the club on a one-year deal. Rein said of the move,"I came here not knowing many of the guys but they’ve been very welcoming and I can’t wait to rip in for the rest of the pre-season,". On 28 April 2018, he scored his first try for the Gold Coast in the 9–10 loss to Cronulla-Sutherland Sharks at Robina Stadium.

Rein made a total of 18 appearances for the Gold Coast in the 2019 NRL season as the club endured a horror year on and off the field. During the halfway mark of the season, head coach Garth Brennan was sacked by the club after a string of poor results. The Gold Coast managed to win only 4 games for the entire season and finished last claiming the Wooden Spoon.

Rein played nine games for the Gold Coast in the 2020 NRL season as the club finished ninth on the table and missed the finals.

Rein made 20 appearances for the Gold Coast in the 2021 NRL season as the club finished in 8th place and qualified for the finals. Rein played for the club in their elimination finals loss against the Sydney Roosters. On 14 September 2021, he was released by the Gold Coast. In October 2021, Rein signed a contract to join Parramatta after being released by the Gold Coast. In round 5 of the 2022 NRL season, Rein made his club debut for Parramatta in a 26–20 victory over the Gold Coast.

On 31 May 2022, Rein re-signed with Parramatta until the end of 2023. On 22nd Of June, Mitch Rein announced his retirement from the NRL, Playing 209 first grade games.
