= Collins Street wooden terraces, Kiama =

Historic site in New South Wales, Australia p

Collins Street wooden terraces
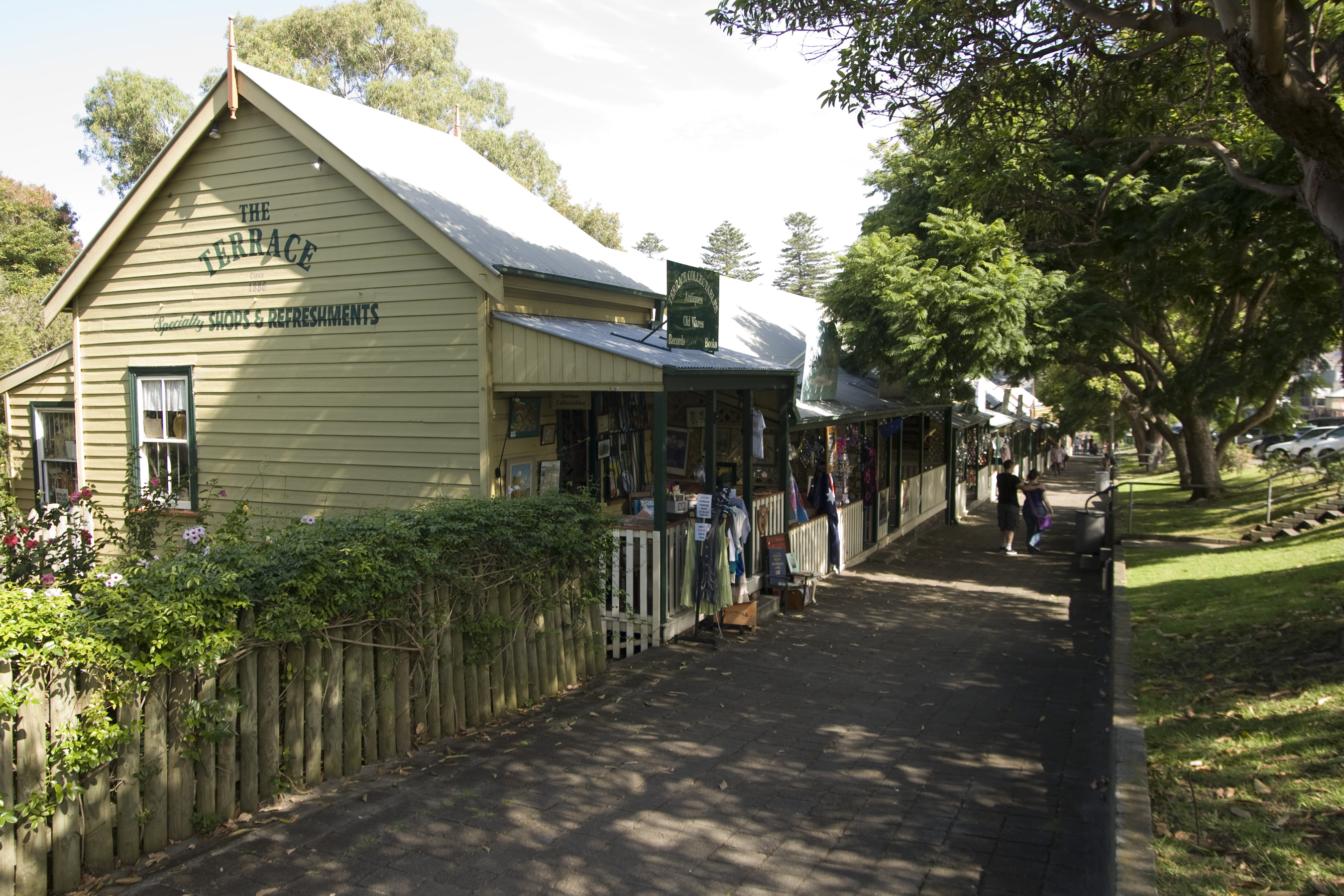
- Row of terraces, 2012

- Location within New South Wales Location within Australia
- 34.6687°S 150.8537°E
- Location: 42–44 Collins Street, Kiama, New South Wales, Australia

History
- Built: 1870

New South Wales Heritage Register
- Official name: Wooden Terraces; Now Commercial Buildings
- Type: state heritage (built)
- Designated: 2 April 1999
- Reference no.: 473
- Type: Terrace
- Category: Residential buildings (private)

The Collins Street wooden terraces are two sets of heritage-listed residences at 24–40 and 42–44 Collins Street, Kiama, New South Wales, Australia. They were built in the 1870s and 1880s. They were added to the New South Wales State Heritage Register on 2 April 1999.

== History ==
=== 24–40 Collins Street ===
Graham, 2016, p. 6 says the row of cottages containing 30–32 Collins Street were built c.1885 by Geoghagen for quarry workers, along what would have been a major road into town and the quarry and its jetty at that time.

The terrace No.s 24–40 Collins Street was built in stages during the 1880s. No. 24 was originally an inn, with 26 the inn-keeper's residence; No.s 28-38 housed quarry workers, and No. 40 was originally a post office.

The cottages fell into disrepair by the 1970s before being purchased by an investment firm, T & A Investments in 1972. This firm undertook extensive renovations restoring verandahs and converting the cottages into shops and cafes, which remains their current use. The six terrace cottages were converted to retail uses in the 1980s. They are one of the town's tourist attractions and in more recent years a number of the other surrounding cottages have been restored and additional new period design buildings added to create a distinct heritage retail precinct.

=== 42–44 Collins Street ===
Built in the late 1870s to house quarry workers. It is a simple single storey building of similar character to the terrace 24–40 Collins Street, of weatherboard with a gabled iron roof. The brick wall at the south end was introduced late 1970s for fire safety reasons. Windows are small paned and there is a simple verandah continuous with the main roof on timber posts with simple timber brackets. Now has sympathetic commercial uses similar to 24-40 Collins Street. Building Material: Weatherboard, gabled iron roof, small paned windows, timber posts and timber brackets (NTA (NSW), 1984).

The terrace No.s 24–40 Collins Street was built in stages during the 1880s. No. 24 was originally an inn, with 26 the inn-keeper's residence; No.s 28–38 housed quarry workers, and No. 40 was originally a post office.

== Description ==
=== 42–44 Collins Street ===
The building is part of a group of former quarry workers' cottages which are an important reminder of the former townscape character of Kiama and its history as a quarrying town.

Built in the late 1870s to house quarry workers. It is a simple single storey building of similar character to the terrace 24–40 Collins Street, of weatherboard with a gabled iron roof. The brick wall at the south end was introduced late 1970s for fire safety reasons. Windows are small paned and there is a simple verandah continuous with the main roof on timber posts with simple timber brackets. Now has sympathetic commercial uses similar to 24–40 Collins Street.

== Heritage listing ==
Wooden Terraces was listed on the New South Wales State Heritage Register on 2 April 1999.
