= Kiama Reservoirs =

Kiama Reservoirs (WS 0231 and WS0232)
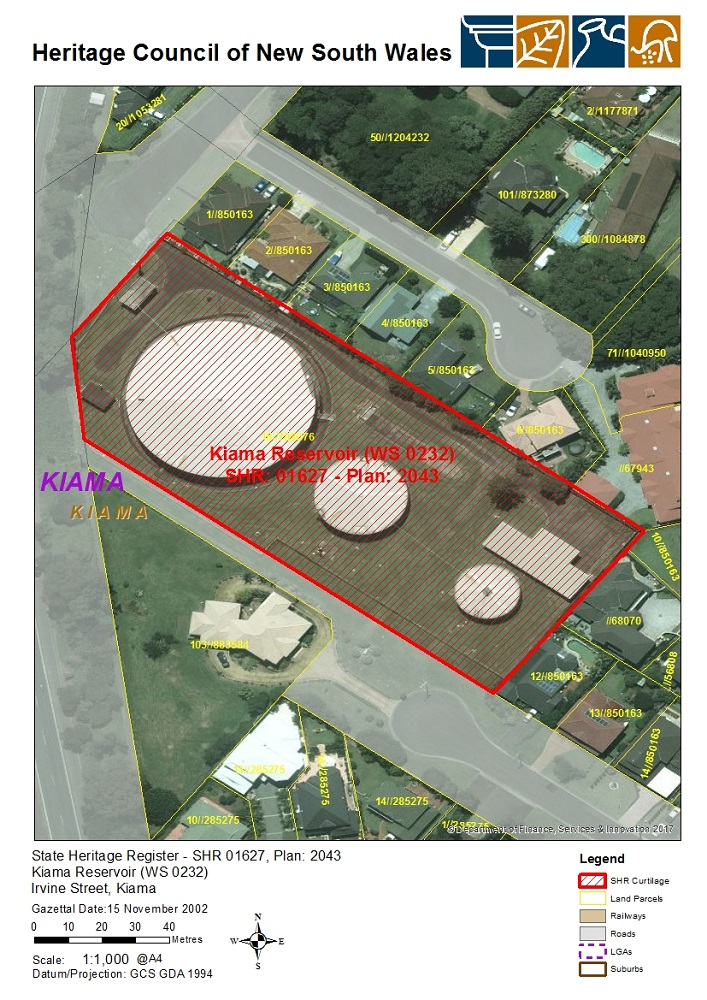
- Heritage boundaries

- Location within New South Wales Location within Australia
- 34.6735°S 150.8438°E
- Location: Irvine Street, Kiama, Municipality of Kiama, New South Wales, Australia

Site notes
- Architect: NSW Department of Public Works ?
- Owner: Sydney Water

New South Wales Heritage Register
- Official name: Kiama Reservoir (WS 0231); WS 0231
- Type: state heritage (built)
- Designated: 15 November 2002
- Reference no.: 1626
- Type: Water Supply Reservoir/ Dam
- Category: Utilities - Water

The Kiama Reservoirs (WS 0231 and WS 0232) are heritage-listed reservoirs at Irvine Street, Kiama, Municipality of Kiama, New South Wales, Australia. They are owned by Sydney Water. It was added to the New South Wales State Heritage Register on 15 November 2002.

== History ==
The Metropolitan Water Supply & Drainage Board initially used water from the Cordeaux River, the nearest of the Upper Nepean tributaries to supply the South Coast, Wollongong and its suburbs. A series of dams were constructed on the Cordeaux River, the principal dams being completed in 1903, 1915 and 1926 respectively.

Because of the height of the ridge (O'Briens Gap) above the coastal area, pressure in the trunk main was too high to be directly connected to reticulation mains. The pressure was broken down by the construction of 5 service reservoirs at the highest points on the coastal plain.

The initial supply scheme from the Cordeaux River to Wollongong was constructed by the NSW Department of Public Works in 1902–1903. It was transferred to the MWS&DB; in 1903. The second major stage of development occurred in 1909 with extension to Port Kembla and Unanderra. The third stage of expansion was completed in 1915 with water supplied to Figtree, Mount Kembla, Kembla Heights, Mount Keira, Keiraville and town to the north of Wollongong, namely Balgownie, Corrimal, Bellambi, Russell Vale, Woonoona, Bulli, Thirroul, Austinmer, Coledale, Scarborough and Clifton. The extensions of supply to Dapto in 1920 and to Mount Drummond (now Mangerton), Tarrawanna, Reidtown, Fern Hill and Fairy Meadow, all in 1922, were supplementary to the third stage of expansion.

Since that date, expansion has occurred in all of the South Coast water supply, although Kiama and Jamberoo, and other southern areas were not connected to the Avon supply until after 1961. In the 1960s, supply was made available from Avon Dam, this dam being originally completed in 1928. Water is now supplied from Avon Dam, via filtration plant, to Mount Keira, Berkeley and Dapto, from whence all other reservoirs receive their supply.

The Kiama Reservoirs were not incorporated into the South Coast or Illawarra Region water supply until after 1961.

== Description ==
=== WS 0231 ===
Kiama Reservoir, located at the south end of the site, is a simple circular reinforced concrete reservoir with a thickened upper rim or rib. There is no visible concrete apron.

Standard features include a handrail in tubular steel, davit, access ladder, inlet and outlet valve chambers and a trigonometric station.

It has a full service level of 90 m and a capacity of 1.1ML.

Kiama Reservoir is located to the north of WS 231. A modern brick building is located next to WS 231.

The reservoir has been roofed to safeguard water quality (1960s-1970s).

=== WS 0232 ===
Kiama Reservoir is located to the north of WS 231. It is a circular reinforced concrete reservoir, but its sides are stepped or tapered, with a thickened rim or rib. There is no visible concrete apron or foundation, which is a standard feature of most surface reservoirs. Standard features include: handrail in tubular steel, depth gauge board, davit, access ladder, inlet and outlet valve chambers.

It has a full service level of 90m and a capacity of 2.3ML.

A modern welded steel reservoir has been constructed at the northern end of the site. Kiama Reservoir is located at the south end of the site.

The reservoir has been roofed to safeguard water quality (1960s-1970s).

== Heritage listing ==
The Kiama Reservoirs are two of a small group of cylindrical concrete reservoirs, serving the needs of small local communities.

The Kiama Reservoirs (WS 0231 and WS0232) were listed on the New South Wales State Heritage Register on 15 November 2002 having satisfied the following criteria.

The place is important in demonstrating the course, or pattern, of cultural or natural history in New South Wales.

This reservoir has an historical association with an independent water supply.

This reservoir demonstrates the low level of demand for a suburban or historical community.

This reservoir or site demonstrates the amplification in demand due to growing population.

The place possesses uncommon, rare or endangered aspects of the cultural or natural history of New South Wales.

One of a small group of concrete surface reservoir with no apron.
