= Kiama Post Office =

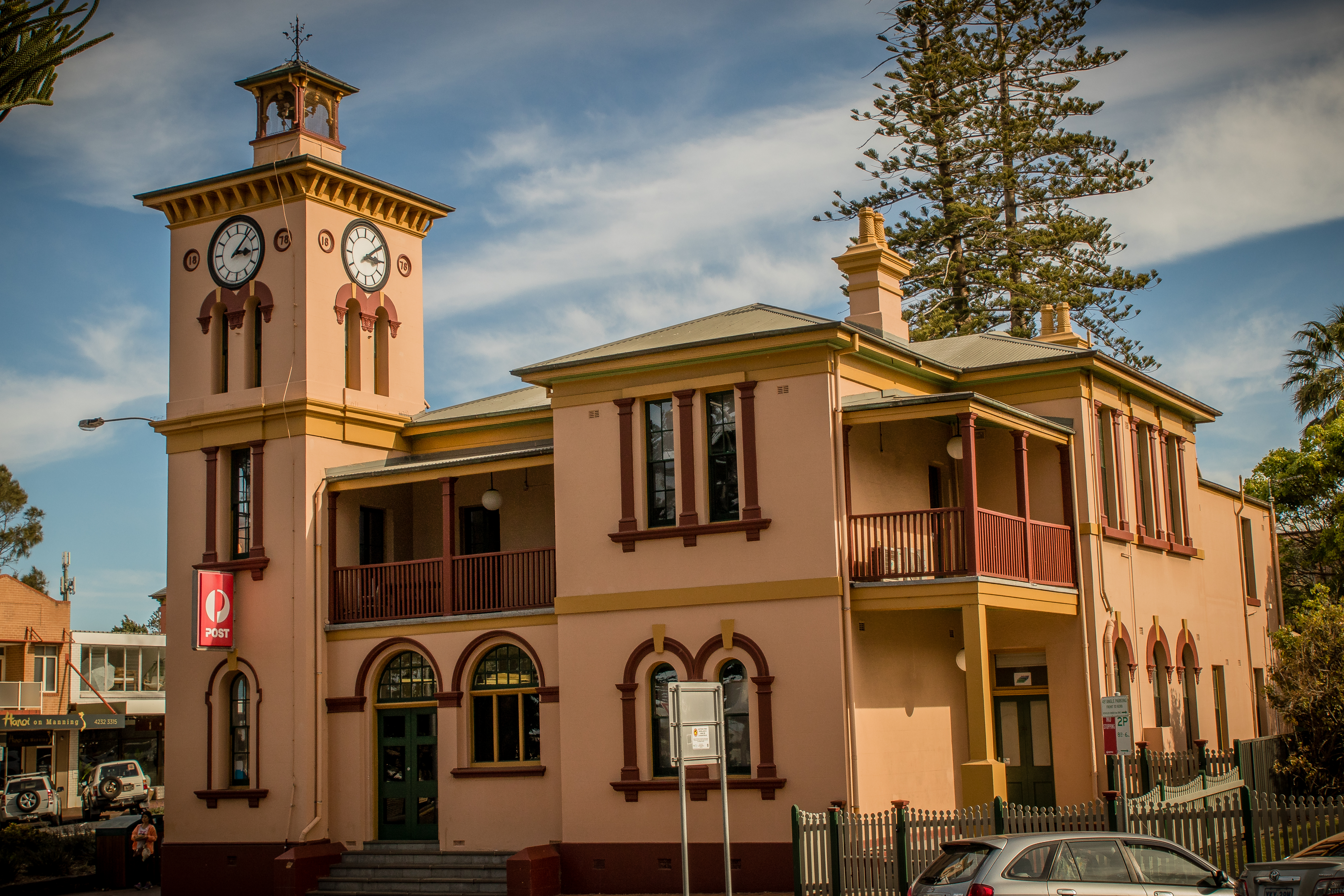
- Kiama Post Office, 2017

- Location within New South Wales Location within Australia
- 34.6719°S 150.8562°E
- Location: 24 Terralong Street, Kiama, New South Wales, Australia

Site notes
- Architect: Colonial Architect's Office under James Barnet.
- Owner: Australia Post

New South Wales Heritage Register
- Official name: Kiama Post Office; Post Office
- Type: state heritage (built)
- Designated: 22 December 2000
- Reference no.: 1426
- Type: Post Office
- Category: Postal and Telecommunications
- Builders: W. R. Vaughan

Kiama Post Office is a heritage-listed post office at 24 Terralong Street, Kiama, New South Wales, Australia. It was designed by the Colonial Architect's Office under James Barnet. and built by W. R. Vaughan. The property is owned by Australia Post.

== History ==
=== Background ===
The first official postal service in Australia was established in April 1809, when the Sydney merchant Isaac Nichols was appointed as the first Postmaster in the colony of New South Wales. Prior to this, mail had been distributed directly by the captain of the ship on which the mail arrived, however this system was neither reliable nor secure.

In 1825 the colonial administration was empowered to establish a Postmaster General's Department, which had previously been administered from Britain.

In 1828 the first post offices outside of Sydney were established, with offices in Bathurst, Campbelltown, Parramatta, Liverpool, Newcastle, Penrith and Windsor. By 1839 there were forty post offices in the colony, with more opened as settlement spread. During the 1860s, the advance of postal services was further increased as the railway network began to be established throughout NSW. In 1863 the Postmaster General W. H. Christie noted that accommodation facilities for Postmasters in some post offices was quite limited, and stated that it was a matter of importance that "post masters should reside and sleep under the same roof as the office".

The first telegraph line was opened in Victoria in March 1854 and in NSW in 1858. The NSW colonial government constructed two lines from the General Post Office, Sydney, one to the South Head Signal Station, the other to Liverpool. Development was slow in NSW compared to the other states, with the Government concentrating on the development of country offices before suburban ones. As the line spread, however, telegraph offices were built to accommodate the operators. Unlike the Post Office, the telegraph office needed specialised equipment and could not be easily accommodated in a local store or private residence. Post and telegraph offices operated separately until 1870 when the departments were amalgamated, after which time new offices were built to include both postal and telegraph services. In 1881 the first telephone exchange was opened in Sydney, three years after the first tests in Adelaide. As with the telegraph, the telephone system soon began to extend into country areas, with telephone exchanges appearing in country NSW from the late 1880s onwards. Again the Post Office was responsible for the public telephone exchange, further emphasising its place in the community as a provider of communications services.

The appointment of James Barnet as Acting Colonial Architect in 1862 coincided with a considerable increase in funding to the public works program. Between 1865 and 1890 the Colonial Architects Office was responsible for the building and maintenance of 169 Post Offices and telegraph offices in NSW. The post offices constructed during this period featured in a variety of architectural styles, as Barnet argued that the local parliamentary representatives always preferred "different patterns".

The construction of new post offices continued throughout the 1890s depression years under the leadership of Walter Liberty Vernon, who held office from 1890 to 1911. While twenty-seven post offices were built between 1892 and 1895, funding to the Government Architect's Office was cut from 1893 to 1895, causing Vernon to postpone a number of projects.

Following Federation in 1901, the Commonwealth Government took over responsibility for post, telegraph and telephone offices, with the Department of Home Affairs Works Division being made responsible for post office construction. In 1916 construction was transferred to the Department of Works and Railways, with the Department of the Interior responsible during World War II.

On 22 December 1975, the Postmaster General's Department was abolished and split into Australia Post and Telecom. In 1989, the Australian Postal Corporation Act established Australia Post as a self-funding entity, heralding a new direction in property management, including a move away from the larger more traditional buildings towards smaller shop-front style post offices.

For much of its history, the post office has been responsible for a wide variety of community services including mail distribution, an agency for the Commonwealth Bank, electoral enrolments, and the provision of telegraph and telephone services. The town post office has served as a focal point for the community, most often built in a prominent position in the centre of town close to other public buildings, creating a nucleus of civic buildings and community pride.

=== Kiama Post Office ===
The earliest record of a postal service to Kiama is a reference to a letter from the Colonial Secretary dated 10 May 1840 referring to an Alexander Wilson's letter proposing a post office for Kiama. Prior to this, mail was bought via steamer from Sydney, as circumstances permitted, or overland to Wollongong once a week from 1832. The Colonial Secretary informed Mr Wilson that the Post Master General, James Raymond, would bring forward a proposal for Kiama in the arrangements of 1841. Kiama's first post office opened on 1 January 1841, 13 years after the first offices outside of Sydney had been established, making it one of the oldest post services in the state. The first postmaster was George Hindmarsh, who held the position until 1844. The mail contract between Campbelltown and Wollongong was held by Ben Rixon who delivered to Wollongong once per week. By 1848 the Campbelltown to Wollongong service ran daily via Appin and Dapto, with an extension between Dapto, Kiama and Shoalhaven twice a week. By 1856 a steamer delivered the mail three times per week to Kiama.

The telegraph line was extended to Kiama in 1862, with the Telegraph Office opening in a rented premises separate to the Post Office. The Station Master was William Camper whose yearly salary was £150, over four times the salary of the Postmaster Thomas Fuller. At the time it was deemed that the telegraph master's job required greater technical skill, and so deserved a higher salary to reflect this.

In 1868 Kiama Post Office was embroiled in a dispute between Postmaster Fuller and the local residents. In April 1868, the PMG received a letter from a Selina C. Cooper of Hartwell House, Kiama, complaining about Fuller and an apparent delay in the delivery of letters to residents. The letter expressed a general dissatisfaction with Fuller from the people of Kiama and called for an inquiry into his running of the post office. An investigation by the Superintendent of the Mail Branch found no evidence of the claims against Fuller and the matter was thought to be over. In May 1868 a second letter of complaint was received regarding Fuller, this time from a local doctor, Doctor Nolan. Another complaint was then received from a Mr Budd, of the Free Trade Stores, which in turn referred to further complaints from within the town. Following these letters, the Secretary at the GPO instructed Inspector Moyse to visit Kiama and report on the growing controversy. Moyse arrived in Kiama on 5 May 1868 and began to first interview those who had complained, then Postmaster Fuller.

Moyse filed a report on his return to Goulburn in which he stated that it appeared that "Mr Fuller is much too independent in his manners for the position he holds, does not treat the inhabitants generally with the courtesy which is due from an official to the public, his office joins his brother's store (and) it is thought that Mr Fuller the storekeeper is at times in possession of information not participated in by other storekeepers". Moyse recommended that the post office be transferred to the telegraph office under the direction of the Telegraph master John Tyter and his wife Agnes. In 1867 the telegraph office had come under the ministerial control of the PMG, but amalgamation of the two offices did not commence until 1870. Following Moyse's report, the PMG moved the post office to the telegraph office with Agnes Tyter appointed as postmistress from 1 July 1868.

In 1870 Agnes Tyter resigned as postmistress due to poor health and was replaced by her husband John, who became both post and telegraph master. Initially the office was located in a cottage in Shoalhaven Street, after which it was transferred to the Council Chambers.

In July 1874, John Stewart, MP, made a representation on behalf of the residents of Kiama to the Parliament for an official post office building in the town. As a result, £1500 was placed on the Estimates for 1875 and the search for a site began. The site selected for the new office was at the corner of Manning and Terralong Streets, which was part of the site reserved for the Town Hall, a point which had caused some delay in the site selection. The first suggestion for the new office was that it be based on the same design as the office in Carcoar that had cost £1500. This was approved by the Postmaster-General, John Fitzgerald Burns. On 19 February 1877, James Barnet, the Colonial Architect, forwarded a plan for an office estimated to cost £3000, a cost that was questioned by both the Secretary for the GPO and the Electric Telegraph Department, but was nonetheless approved by Burns' successor as Postmaster-General, Saul Samuel.

On 9 July 1877, a further £1700 was added to the estimates for the new building with the call for tenders being made in October. On 2 January 1878 the tender was awarded to W. R. Vaughan for £3300 with the office being completed on 13 December 1878. On 17 December 1878 a further £225.12.0 was requested for the erection of fencing, gates and other works for the office. On 12 January 1879 Postal Inspector Davies forwarded another list of required fittings, which was referred to the Colonial Architect. Davies reported again in April on the building stating that arrangements for posting letters in the new building were unsafe, and that there was no provision to transact money orders or Government Savings Bank business.

By December 1879 the new building was still unoccupied despite having been completed for over a year. On 6 January 1880 the Postmaster Mr Tyter advised that he was preparing to occupy the building, but that the Telegraph arrangements were still not complete. He was ordered to occupy the building in any case, and the office opened for business on 19 January 1880.

Throughout 1880, Postmaster Tyter kept up a correspondence with the department requesting a number of additional fittings to the office, including a stable and shed for storage, a 400-gallon water tank and extra lighting under the colonnade to light the post boxes at night. In September 1881, Tyter requested that a bathroom and wash house also be erected, an item that was not considered essential for official residences at the time. The request provoked the Secretary to prepare a lengthy minute in which the apparent extra expenses that had been incurred on the Kiama office were listed. It was noted that the combined postal and telegraph revenue for Kiama was only £800 per annum and it was recommended that no further expenditure be approved beyond that already agreed to. It was not until April 1900 that approval for the erection of a wash house was given.

In December 1895 John Tyter retired as Postmaster of Kiama after 25 years service. Luke Kingsmill, then Postmaster at Forbes, who had specifically requested the position, replaced Tyter as Postmaster. Tyter was granted a pension of £151.5.0 per year by the department from 1 February 1896. He died in October 1897 at the age of 62.

The small size of Kiama created some problems for the office through the 1890s as a number of staff were transferred away. Following complaints from local residents, the post office and local press, an inquiry was held in 1898. The investigation found no reason to increase the staff at the office, adding that with proper management the staff problems could be resolved internally.

In 1905 the Progress Association requested that a counter be provided for the transaction of business as the public were still being served via a delivery window. A cedar counter and writing slope were provided shortly afterwards. In 1911 the telephone exchange was opened at Kiama with a daytime-only service being provided. A full service was introduced from May 1914.

Little remains in way of detail for any work carried out at Kiama after this date, although it appears that no significant external work has been carried out. Renovations in 1978 saw three downstairs rooms of the Postmasters residence absorbed for office use, with the residence being confined to the upstairs portion of the office.

The exterior of Kiama Post Office was repainted from a white wash finish to the current colour scheme in the mid-1990s.

== Description ==
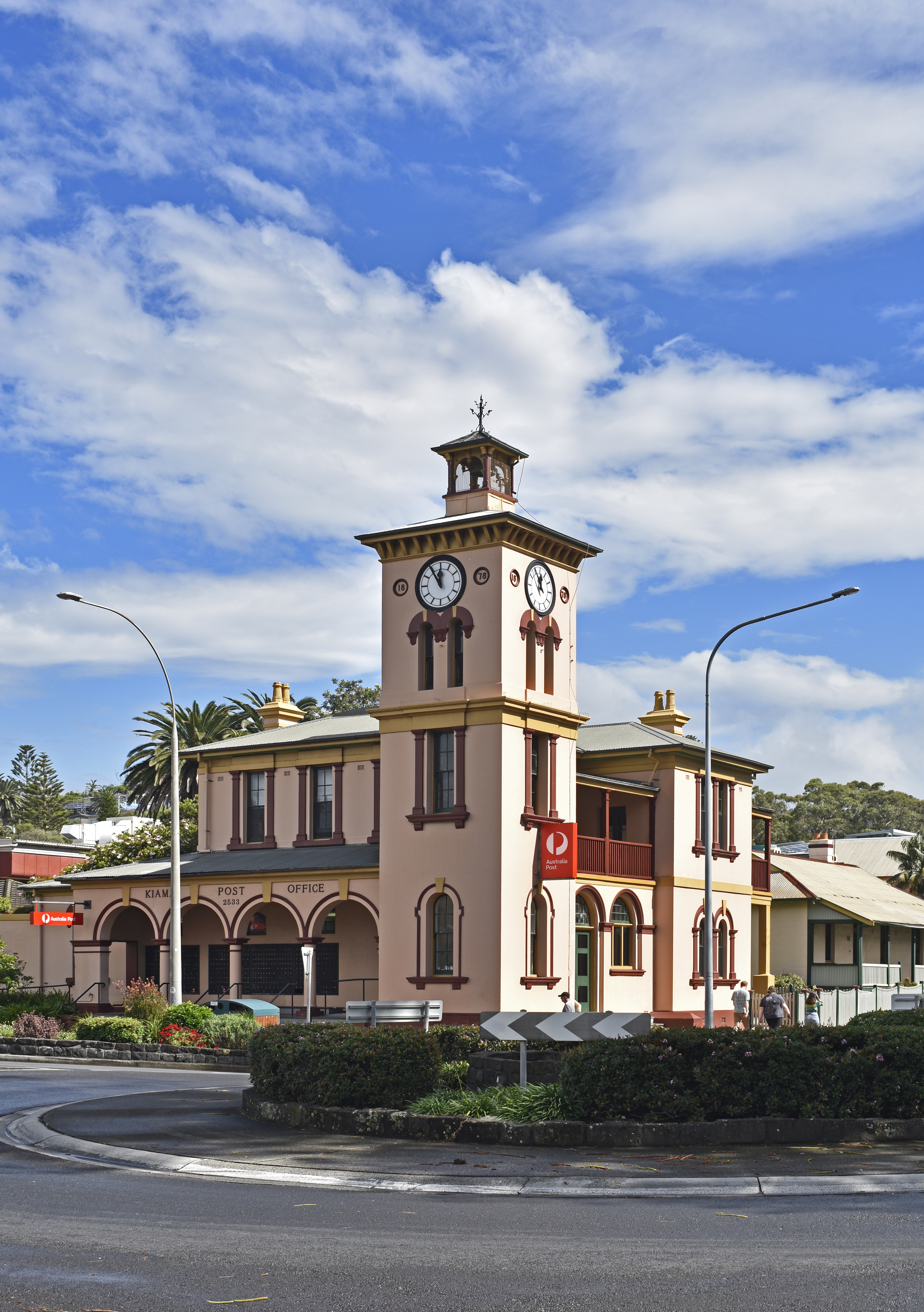
Kiama Post Office seen from the northeast

Kiama Post Office is located within the central business and tourist district of Kiama. The building is situated on the prominent corner position of Terralong and Manning Streets and overlooks Kiama Harbour to the north.

It is a two-storey, rendered brick Victorian Italianate building with a three-storey corner clock tower surmounted by a small belfry. It is the earliest surviving example of a corner clock tower as a design element in NSW. The roof is predominantly hipped, of corrugated steel, with a pyramidal roof on the corner tower and belfry, and a steel finial and lightning conductor at the apex. There is a skillion roof on the south-eastern single-storey additions. Four chimneys punctuate the roofline of the two-storey section, one at the southernmost end of the south-western wing, one either side of the southern edge of the main roof section and one at the north-western corner. Each chimney is rendered, with moulded tops and terracotta chimney pots.

It appears that only a few major additions have occurred to the Post Office since first constructed in 1878. These are largely single-storey, towards the rear along the eastern boundary, including the hipped-roof section over the mail room and skillion roof over the current staff amenities.

Verandahs on the first-floor northern facade and north-western corner comprise asphalt lined floors, raked board and batten, and boarded soffits, respectively, green painted vertical slat timber balustrades with timber posts and wall mounted globe lights. There is a small concrete porch on the north-western corner of the ground floor below the upper verandah, without a balustrade. To the eastern facade, there is a colonnade with burnt red, clay-tiled floor and steps, masonry arches and columns, board and batten soffit and pebblecrete curved ramp at the southern end.

The clock tower is accessed internally via a recent steel vertical ladder from the ground-floor to the first, and via a timber ladder to the clock mechanism on the third-floor. French doors to the tower open out onto the northern facade first-floor verandah and the interior walls are rendered, with timber-boarded floors.

The Post Office has been recently painted with a distinctive salmon-pink colour scheme including red detailing of arches, openings, posts and smooth columns. The exterior is distinguished by the use of Tuscan elements that include the slender column pilasters which flank the first floor windows. The eaves and a moulded string course below the first floor eaves which is continuous around the tower have been painted a tan colour. The bracketed eaves below the main roof of the tower have also been painted tan, and the rendered base course "skirting" is painted light brown.

Below the bracketed eaves are four clock faces with black lettering on a white background, one to each side, with moulded circles either side of each clock face encircling the numbers 18 and 78 to the left and right sides respectively. Classically moulded detailing is also used on the uniformly spaced openings and the four bay, round arched colonnade, including slender pilasters to the sides of windows and prominent keystones within moulded arches.

The ground-floor interior comprises four major areas. These incorporate the carpeted retail area in the north-eastern quarter, carpeted mail room and post boxes on the eastern side, carpeted lunch room on the western side and other tiled staff amenities in the south eastern corner, and carpeted office areas in the south-western corner.

Ceilings of the ground-floor are predominantly plasterboard with coved cornices in the western side offices, mail room and retail areas. The north-western corner store room has a square set plaster ceiling with moulded cornice and a small ceiling rose; there is a raked board and batten ceiling in the rear office infill. Lighting comprises attached and suspended fluorescent tubing and air-conditioning is limited to a wall-mounted unit in the mail room.

Architraves appear to be original, in the northern half of the building in particular, being stained and possibly restored. Later architraves appear in the rear centre infills. Original or early brown skirting is located on original fabric of the northern section, with modern black strip skirting in the retail area and offices.

Windows of the ground floor include original arched, two pane upper and single pane lower sash windows; six pane upper and lower sash windows; and multi pane wide arched windows to the northern facade arcade infill. c. 1950-60s louvred and top hung windows. The rear infills and additions feature doors to the ground-floor are mainly modern flush and sliding doors, with a few stained, four panel original doors retained.

Ground-floor walls are painted the standard Australia Post grey colour scheme on the majority of the floors, with pale green and apricot schemes with brown trim on the north-western corner and western side. Walls are mainly painted rendered brick, with recent partition walls enclosing the south-western offices and store rooms. There are three chimney breasts retained, with only two surrounds. They are all bricked in or boarded over.

The central staircase is of stained and polished timber, with a curved rail, spiral bottom post and squared balusters. There is vinyl sheet to the treads and there are carved brackets and timber panelling below the stair. Skirting to the stair appears original.

The first-floor former residence currently disused, comprises three bedrooms, a sitting room, a kitchen in the south-western corner, and a bathroom on the western side. All rooms excepting the kitchen are off a central hallway and the floor is fully carpeted, with the exception of the sheet vinyl floor of the kitchen and modern bathroom tiling.

First-floor ceilings comprise plaster with a coved cornice in the western side sitting room, plaster and wide batten ceilings in the north-western corner bedroom and bathroom, and flush plaster in the hall, kitchen and remaining bedrooms. There are wall-mounted air conditioning units in the kitchen and north-western bedroom and lighting combines fluorescent tubing and pendant lights.

As with the ground-floor, the first-floor architraves are stained and possibly restored. Skirting is wide, excepting that in the kitchen, which has later, narrower skirting, all painted dark brown.

Windows of the first-floor are predominantly original four pane upper and lower sash and six pane upper and lower sash windows. Doors are stained, featuring four panels and early hardware, and there are original French doors opening onto the verandahs.

Walls on the first-floor are rendered and painted brick in an overall light green colour scheme with dark brown trim. Three fireplaces have been retained, each with marble surrounds, however all have been boarded over.

Standard Australia Post signage is located at the southern end of the eastern colonnade and on the northern face, of the corner clock tower. Lettering to the building is limited to the eastern facade, with "Kiama Post Office 2533" centred over the arched bays, below the eaves of the eastern facade.

The surrounding buildings are predominantly two-storey, twentieth century shopfronts and nineteenth century civic buildings such as the classically styled Council Chambers to the south. Fencing around the building comprises low picket and recent steel fencing and the rear yard is concrete with some areas of grass. The streets are landscaped with pedestrian islands and low shrubbery and to the north is a large grassed area sloping down to the harbour lined with large Norfolk Island pine trees that dominate the view.

The only outbuilding associated with the Post Office is the timber boarded shed to the southern boundary of the site, with a recent hipped, corrugated steel roof. The building is painted a complementary salmon pink colour to the Post Office and has later windows and doors installed, including a roller door. This building is possibly the original shown to the left in the 1878 photograph, and is possibly the original stables, although substantially modified.

Kiama Post Office was reported to be in very good condition as at 6 July 2000, with the archaeological potential of the site described as high.

Kiama Post Office is substantially intact to its original form, and retains the features which make it culturally significant, including the prominent corner tower, Tuscan detailing and arcade, along with its overall style, scale and location.

=== Modifications and dates ===
- Kiama Post Office was completed in December 1878. The original building comprised the two-storey section and clock tower, without the crowning belfry of the tower. When first built, the clock faces had white lettering on a black background, and it appears from an early photograph that the building was not originally rendered, but face brick with rendered or stone detailing. The building was not occupied until January 1880 due to fitting and fixture problems.
- A stable and outhouse were completed in August 1881.
- It was not until April 1900 that a wash house was constructed for the residence.
- The belfry appears to be an early addition, however the date of its construction is unknown.
- Dates are unknown as to when the northern facade arcade was infilled and entry doors were installed to the eastern arch, and when the column matching those of the eastern colonnade supporting the north western ground floor porch was replaced.
- In August 1977, the present white translucent clock faces were installed during general renovations and alterations of the building.
- During the renovations of 1978, the three ground-floor rooms of the residence on the western side were incorporated into the Post Office. The residence was confined to the first-floor as a result. This was possibly the time when the south eastern single storey skillion wing, containing staff bathrooms, was constructed and the original wash house was modified.
- Overall repainting of the building with the salmon pink colour scheme occurred during the mid-1990s, replacing an overall whitewash.
- 1990s standard Australia Post fitout of the retail area, including the closing off of the ground floor northern entry.

== Heritage listing ==
Kiama Post Office is significant at a State level for its historical associations, aesthetic qualities and social meaning.

Kiama Post Office is associated with the first post office established in the town in 1841, and as such is linked with the early development of the town in the mid-nineteenth century. Kiama Post Office has been the centre of communications for Kiama for over a century, and reflects the growing population and demands for improved mail and telegraph services in the area.

Kiama Post Office also provides evidence of the changing nature of postal and telecommunications practices in NSW and features the earliest surviving use of the corner clock tower as a design element in NSW. Kiama Post Office is aesthetically significant because it is a substantial, intact and picturesque example of the Victorian Italianate style, and makes an important aesthetic contribution to the civic precinct in Kiama. Kiama Post Office is also associated with the Colonial Architect's Office under James Barnet, a key practitioner of the Victorian Italianate style of architecture. Kiama Post Office is also considered to be significant to the Kiama community's sense of place.

Kiama Post Office was listed on the New South Wales State Heritage Register on 22 December 2000 having satisfied the following criteria.

The place is important in demonstrating the course, or pattern, of cultural or natural history in New South Wales.

Kiama Post Office is associated with the first post office established in the town in 1841, and as such is linked with the early development of the town. The current Kiama Post Office has been the centre of communications in the town for over a century. It is also the earliest surviving use of the corner clock tower as a design element in NSW. Kiama Post Office reflects the growing population and demands for improved mail and telegraph services in the area and provides evidence of the changing nature of postal and telecommunications practices in NSW. Kiama Post Office was designed by the NSW Colonial Architect's Office under James Barnet, a key practitioner of the Victorian Italianate style of architecture.

The place is important in demonstrating aesthetic characteristics and/or a high degree of creative or technical achievement in New South Wales.

Kiama Post Office is aesthetically significant because it is a particularly fine example of the Victorian Italianate style. It is distinguished by the use of Tuscan elements that include the slender column pilasters, which flank the first floor windows.

The scale, architectural style and location of the building, along with the prominent corner clock tower, also make it a focal point of Kiama, endowing it with landmark qualities. It is part of a strong civic group of buildings that includes the Court House, Police Station and residence.

The place has a strong or special association with a particular community or cultural group in New South Wales for social, cultural or spiritual reasons.

As a local landmark and the centre of communications for the town for over a century, Kiama Post Office is considered to be highly significant to the Kiama community's sense of place.

The place has potential to yield information that will contribute to an understanding of the cultural or natural history of New South Wales.

The archaeological potential of the site is considered to be high, due to the open plan of the rear of the site, which may contain remnants related to early buildings and early uses of the site. As the site is located along the foreshore, it may also contain resources associated with Aboriginal occupation of the area.

The place possesses uncommon, rare or endangered aspects of the cultural or natural history of New South Wales.

Kiama Post Office is a substantial and picturesque example of the Victorian Italianate architectural style in NSW. It is also the earliest surviving use of the corner clock tower as a design element in NSW.

The place is important in demonstrating the principal characteristics of a class of cultural or natural places/environments in New South Wales.

Kiama Post Office is part of the large group of nineteenth-century post offices in NSW designed by the Colonial Architect's Office under James Barnet, which designed and maintained a large number of post offices across NSW between 1865 and 1890.
