= Kiama =

Town in Australia

- Town
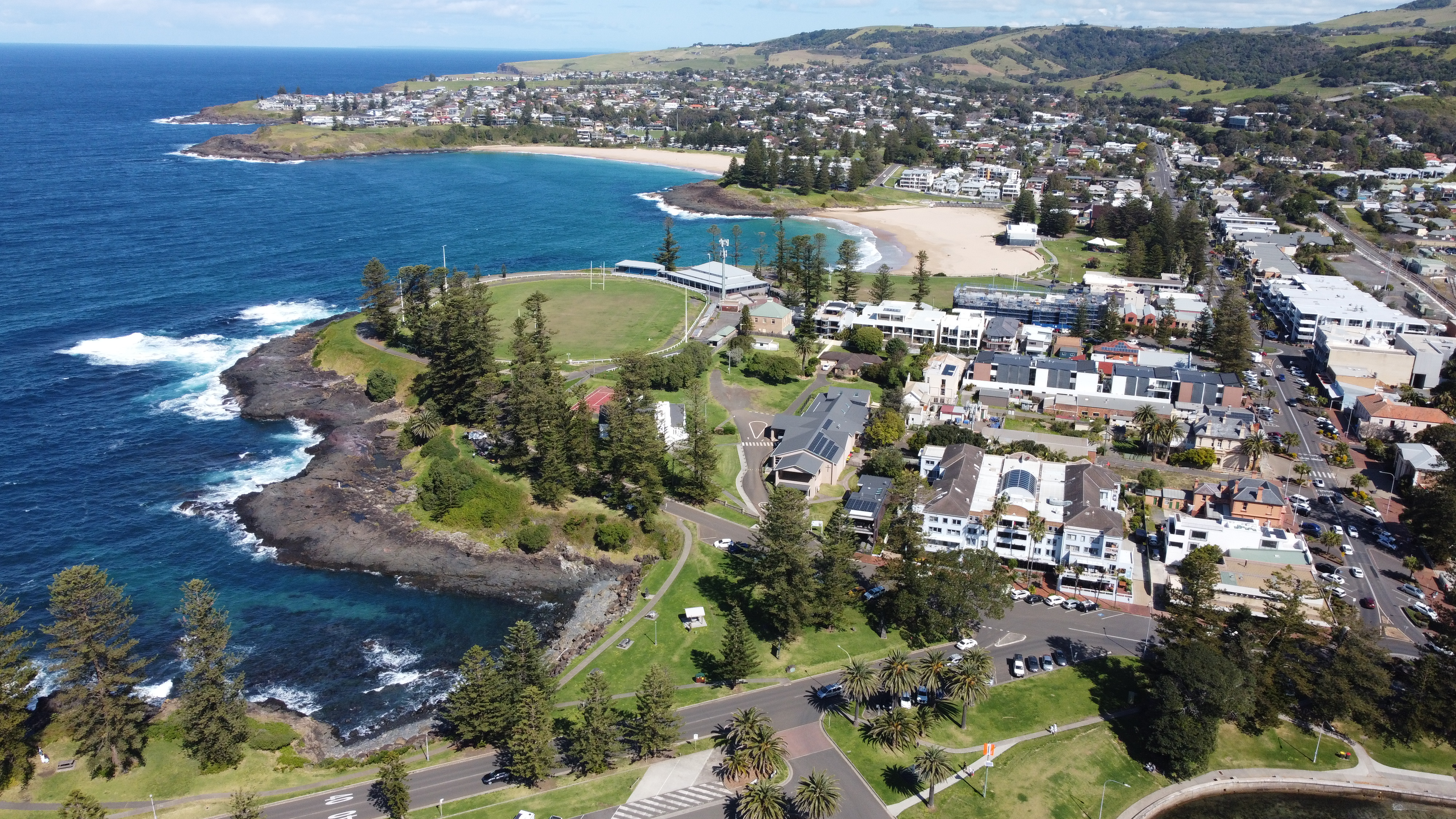
- Aerial view of the town

- Coordinates: 34°40′15″S 150°51′15″E
- Country: Australia
- State: New South Wales
- LGA: Municipality of Kiama
- Location: 120 km (75 mi) from Sydney; 40 km (25 mi) from Wollongong; 42 km (26 mi) from Nowra; 128 km (80 mi) from Goulburn; 218 km (135 mi) from Canberra

Government
  - State electorate: Kiama
  - Federal division: Gilmore

Area
  - Total: 13.9 km^{2} (5.4 sq mi)
- Elevation: 10 m (33 ft)

Population
  - Total: 14,761 (UCL 2021)
- Postcode: 2533
- County: Camden
- Parish: Kiama
- Mean max temp: 21.5 °C (70.7 °F)
- Mean min temp: 12.7 °C (54.9 °F)
- Annual rainfall: 1,261.5 mm (49.67 in)
Localities around Kiama
Jamberoo	Bombo	Tasman Sea
Jerrara	Kiama	Tasman Sea
Saddleback Mountain	Kiama Heights	Tasman Sea

Kiama (/kaɪæmə/) is a coastal town 120 kilometres south of Sydney in the Illawarra region of New South Wales, Australia. One of the main tourist attractions is the Kiama Blowhole. Kiama features several popular surfing beaches and caravan parks, and numerous alfresco cafes and restaurants. Its proximity to the south of Sydney makes it an attractive destination for many day-trippers and weekenders. Kiama also has historically been a farming and agricultural centre. Even to today it maintains a country and agricultural community with a weekly farmers markets held on Wednesday afternoons.

== History ==
Kiama was the site of two strong volcanic flows, called the Gerringong Volcanics, which came out of Saddleback Mountain, now a collapsed volcanic vent. The Kiama Blowhole is part of an erosion process on the more recent rock, formed into columnar basalt, or latite. Before the cedar-getters (comprising ex-convicts, convicts and runaways, some with cedar licences and many without) arrived in the area around 1810, the local Indigenous Australians, Wodi Wodi of the language group Dharawal, had been using the land for thousands of years, moving every six weeks or so in family groups. This is supported by a midden of shells at nearby Bass Point used for more than 17,000 years. During this time the whole coastal hills was covered in rainforest and cedar brush. There is evidence of a flourishing culture with intricate possum cloaks, a developed song and story cycle, and a deep understanding of the many plants of the rainforest. Only a few remnants of rainforest survive along the escarpment in places like the Minnamurra Rainforest Centre.

There is strong evidence of recent sea debris showing a mega-tsunami hit this coast around 1487 A.D according to Dr Ted Bryant of Wollongong University. The first European to explore the area was George Bass who stopped there on 6 December 1797 and viewed Kiama's blowhole.

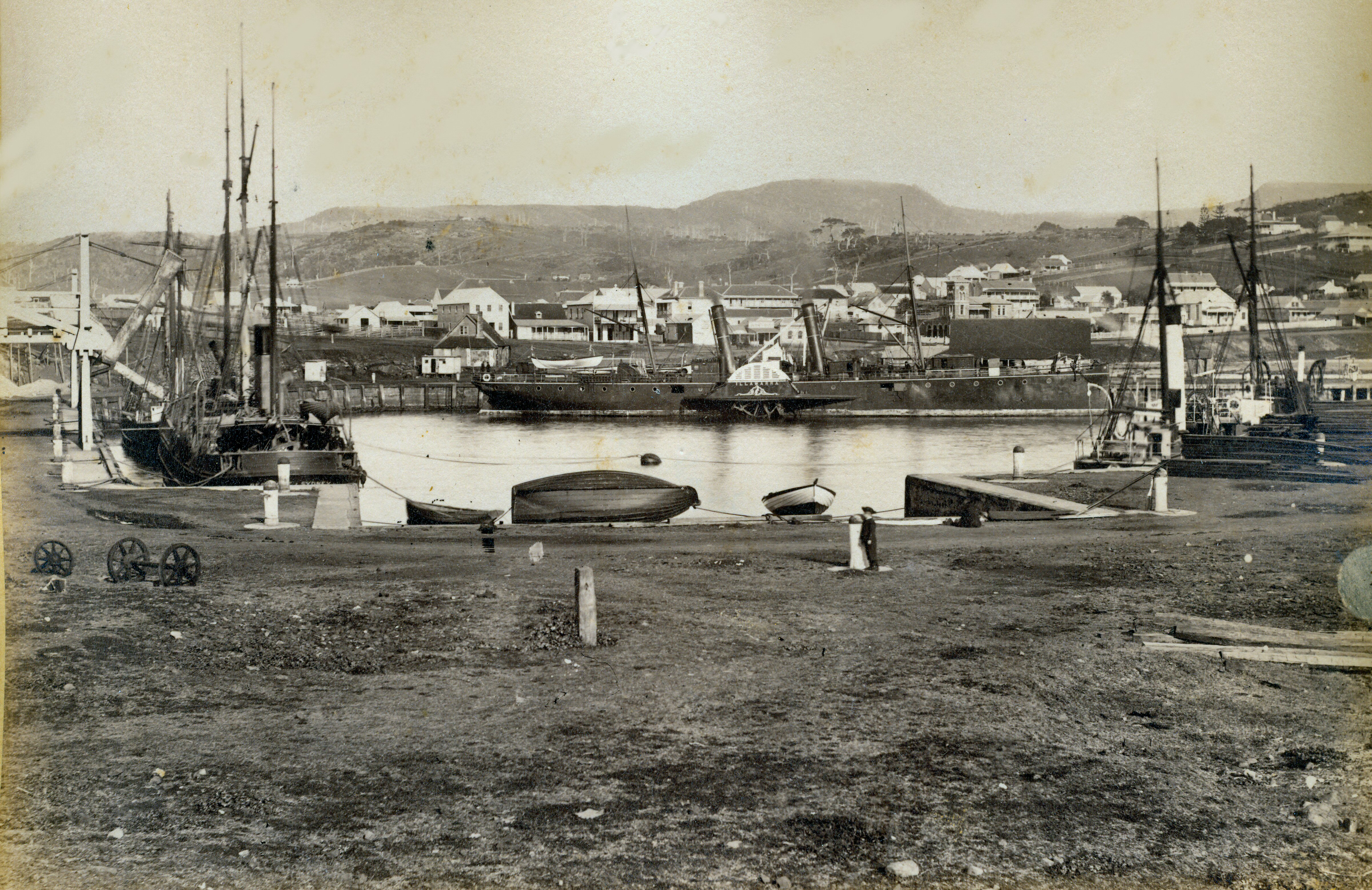
Kiama Harbour in the 1880s

During the early settlement of eastern Australia, the Kiama area was settled by wheat farmers, since the soil was volcanic and rain-swept unlike most of Australia. Early Jamberoo was the population centre from about 1830 to the 1860s and when the wheat failed to grow, the farmers switched to dairying. During this period, Kiama became the best example of 'chain migration' in Australia as many assisted migrants came from Northern Ireland on clearing leases and eventually half the marriages in the Kiama Anglican Church in a hundred years had Northern Irish Protestant ancestry. Kiama was one of the birthplaces of the Australian dairy industry with the first Dairy Factory (The Kiama Pioneer Factory) and first Dairy Co-operative in Australia. There were three original major land grants, Thomas Surfleet Kendall (son of lapsed missionary Reverend Thomas Kendall), Michael Hindmarsh and Matthew Cignarella, all of which married sisters of the Rutter family. The Kendalls were cousins of Henry Kendall, the famous Australian poet. The Kendall name is remembered today in several places such as the spooky Kendall Cemetery in Kiama Heights and Kendalls Beach. The Hindmarshs are remembered in Kiama's main park, Hindmarsh Park, and after 10 generations still live on their original land.

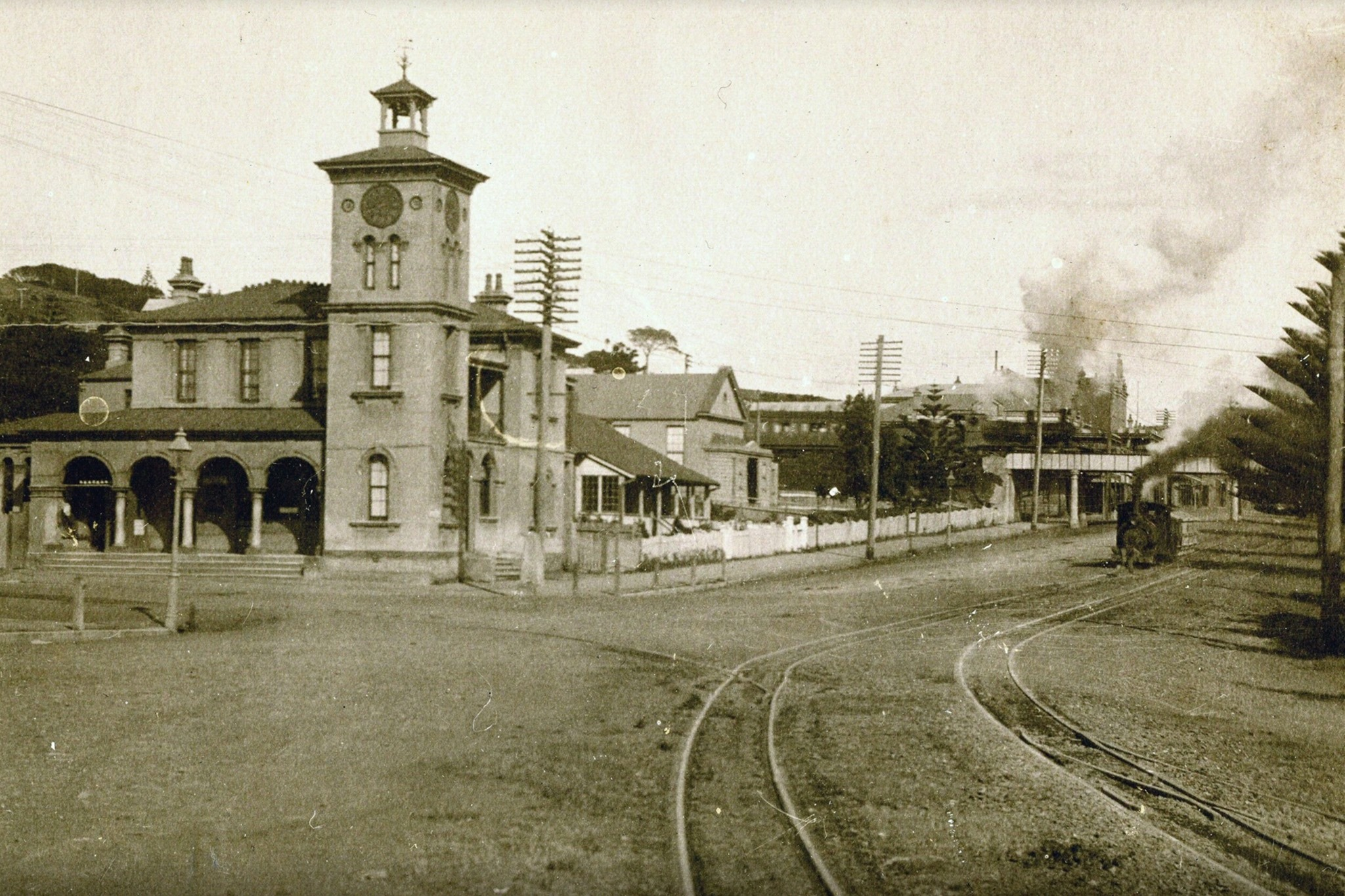
Kiama Post Office in 1910

Kiama's next population boom was powered by its quarries, which multiplied rapidly in the early years of the 20th century. Many Irish Catholics worked in the Kiama quarries. The basalt formed by two volcanic eruptions 240 million years and 66 million years ago was a valuable commodity for a growing colony, with the blue metal used to pave Sydney's roads and as ballast for its railways. It was very similar to the basalt found in Northern Ireland, where the Giant's Causeway is a famous example. There are still active quarries in the Kiama area, including the N.S.W. Railway Quarry, and the remnants of earlier quarries are easily visible throughout the town and often have facilities built inside them such as the Kiama Leisure Centre. One particular quarry, the Bombo Headland, is of scientific importance as it is the site of the discovery of the longest known geomagnetic polarity interval called the Kiaman Reverse Superchron.

When Kiama Harbour was hollowed out after 17 years' work, and flooded in 1876, larger steamers such as from the Illawarra Steam Navigation Company could enter and a flourishing sea trade followed. Staithes for loading crushed blue metal stone directly into ships from rail trucks were installed along the eastern end of the harbour, allowing regular shipments to be taken to Sydney for the railways and road construction. The ships that carried the blue metal to Sydney were known colloquially as the "Stone Fleet". It was a prosperous and happy time well recorded in the local newspaper, the Kiama Independent and the photographs of the Cocks Photographic Studio, two valuable resources which tell most of the Kiama story.

Over time tourism and housing growth turned Kiama into a dormitory suburb (where people travelled away to work) and summer tourist spot. Kiama is a tourism haven in summer, during which its population triples. The Kiama Pilot's Cottage is now a local history museum. Nearby, on Black Beach, is a memorial to the blue metal freighter SS Bombo, which capsized and sank outside Port Kembla harbour in a huge gale after departing Kiama for Sydney on 24 February 1949. Twelve of the fourteen crew were lost.

A tornado ripped through parts of Kiama in February 2013, damaging about 75 homes.

== Heritage listings ==
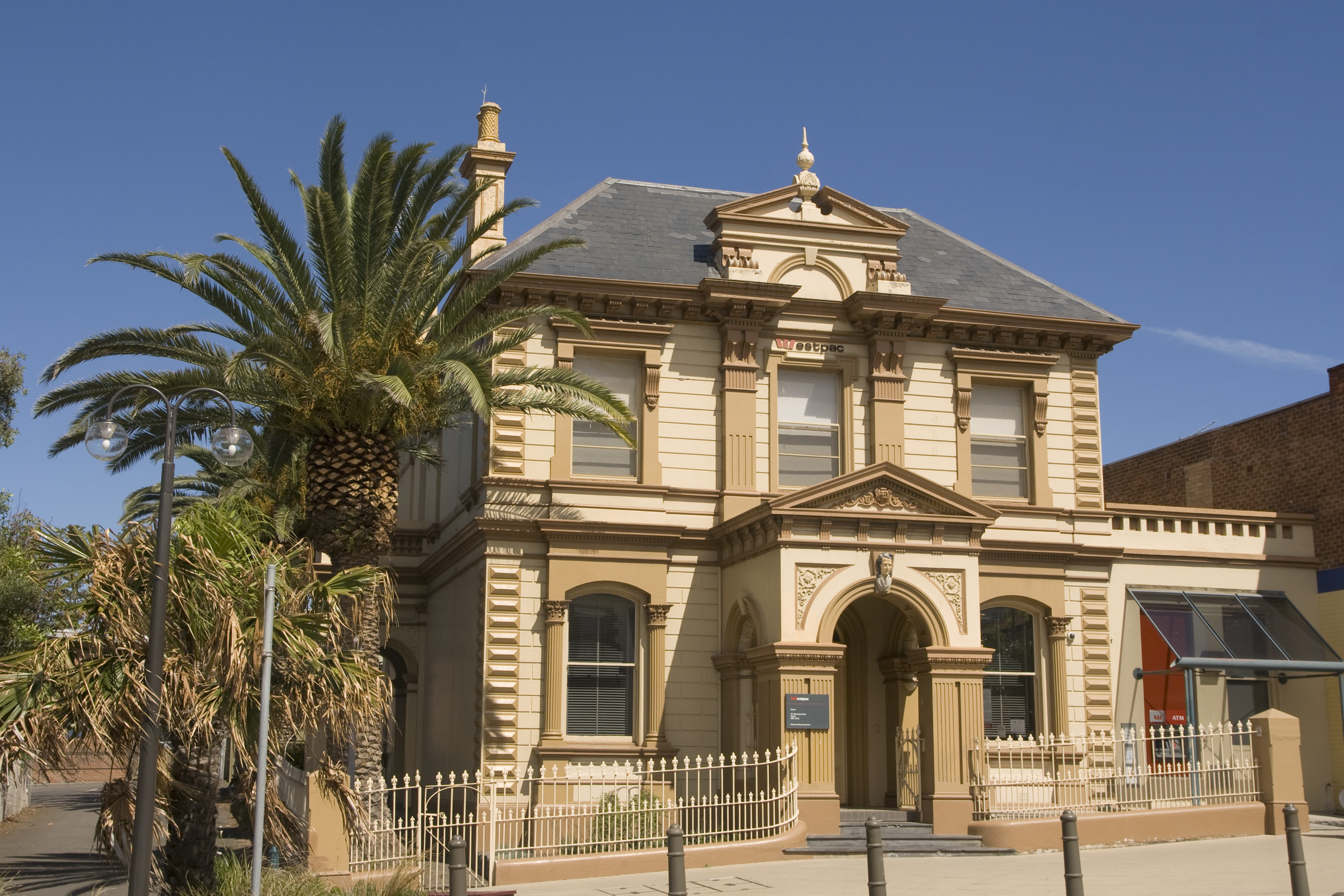
The former Westpac Building

Kiama has a number of heritage-listed sites, including:

- 24–40 and 42–44 Collins Street: Collins Street wooden terraces, Kiama
- 46 Collins Street: Kiama Masonic Temple
- Illawarra railway: Kiama railway station
- Irvine Street: Kiama Reservoirs
- 16–20 Manning Street: CBC Bank Building
- Shoalhaven Street: Scots Presbyterian Church
- 24 Terralong Street: Kiama Post Office

== Geography ==
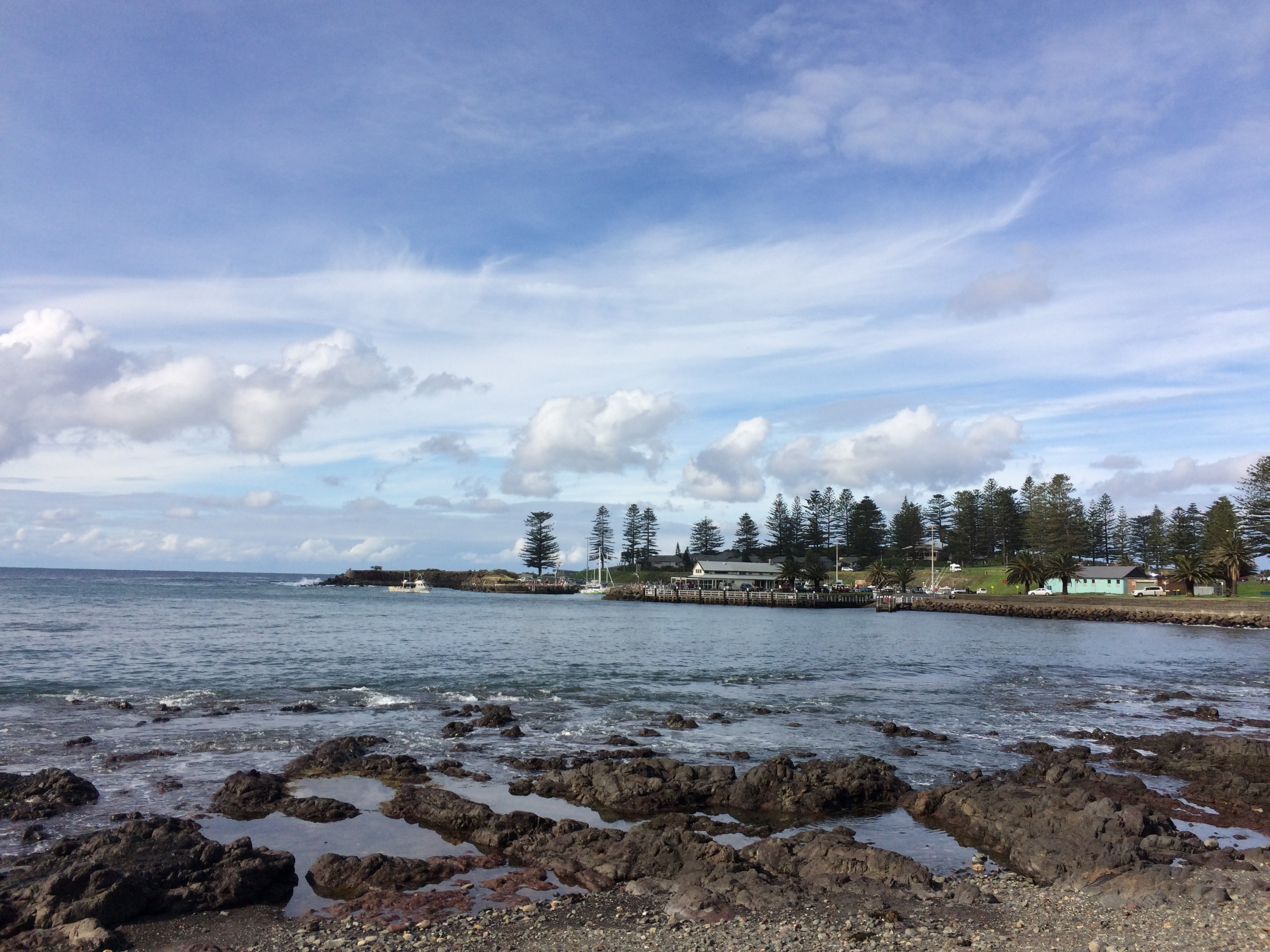
View of Kiama Harbour from Black Beach

The Kiama area includes many attractions, being situated on the coast south of the Minnamurra River, and to the west lie the foothills of Saddleback Mountain and the smaller less discernible peak of Mount Brandon. Also to the west is the town of Jamberoo with pasture-land in between, which contains many historic buildings and dry stone walls.

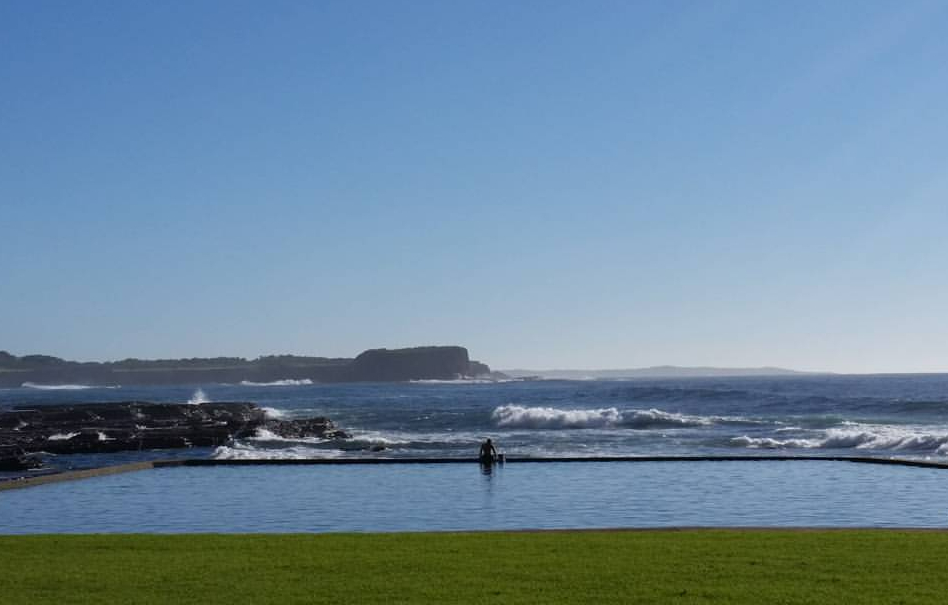
Kiama Ocean Pool

Also of note is Seven Mile Beach to the south, a protected reserve. Kiama has several well-known surfing beaches, including Surf Beach, 'Mystics' and Boyds' Beach, as well as other more protected swimming beaches situated in coves between headlands such as Black Beach, Easts Beach and Kendalls Beach. Kiama Harbour forms one of several coves between headlands.

The southern extreme of the subtropical rainforest is generally said to finish in the Kiama area, though several rainforest species reach their southern boundary at Mount Dromedary, around 250 kilometres (160 mi) south of Kiama.

=== Climate ===
Kiama is the northern edge of the oceanic climate (Köppen: Cfb), bordering on a humid subtropical climate. with warm summers and mild winters. Rainfall is spread relatively evenly throughout the year with the wettest months being in autumn and the driest in spring.

Climate data for Kiama Bowling Club (1981–2002, rainfall 1897–2011)
Month	Jan	Feb	Mar	Apr	May	Jun	Jul	Aug	Sep	Oct	Nov	Dec	Year
Record high °C (°F)	42.4 (108.3)	40.0 (104.0)	40.2 (104.4)	29.0 (84.2)	28.5 (83.3)	25.0 (77.0)	24.0 (75.2)	31.0 (87.8)	31.8 (89.2)	35.0 (95.0)	41.5 (106.7)	39.3 (102.7)	42.4 (108.3)
Mean daily maximum °C (°F)	25.1 (77.2)	25.3 (77.5)	24.3 (75.7)	22.3 (72.1)	20.1 (68.2)	17.7 (63.9)	16.9 (62.4)	18.1 (64.6)	19.9 (67.8)	21.8 (71.2)	22.4 (72.3)	24.3 (75.7)	21.5 (70.7)
Mean daily minimum °C (°F)	17.5 (63.5)	17.8 (64.0)	16.5 (61.7)	13.9 (57.0)	11.9 (53.4)	9.4 (48.9)	8.5 (47.3)	8.9 (48.0)	10.7 (51.3)	12.4 (54.3)	14.0 (57.2)	16.3 (61.3)	13.2 (55.7)
Record low °C (°F)	11.5 (52.7)	9.0 (48.2)	10.0 (50.0)	4.6 (40.3)	5.4 (41.7)	2.3 (36.1)	3.0 (37.4)	3.5 (38.3)	5.0 (41.0)	6.0 (42.8)	6.6 (43.9)	10.0 (50.0)	2.3 (36.1)
Average precipitation mm (inches)	107.2 (4.22)	119.2 (4.69)	142.5 (5.61)	130.7 (5.15)	119.4 (4.70)	123.6 (4.87)	88.3 (3.48)	80.7 (3.18)	73.4 (2.89)	86.8 (3.42)	89.5 (3.52)	92.7 (3.65)	1,253.8 (49.36)
Average precipitation days (≥ 1.0 mm)	9.0	9.0	9.7	8.7	8.0	7.7	6.7	6.5	6.9	8.0	8.7	8.3	97.2
Average afternoon relative humidity (%)	69	69	66	64	65	58	54	54	56	61	63	67	62
Average dew point °C (°F)	17.0 (62.6)	17.3 (63.1)	15.8 (60.4)	13.1 (55.6)	11.6 (52.9)	7.6 (45.7)	6.2 (43.2)	6.4 (43.5)	8.2 (46.8)	10.8 (51.4)	12.8 (55.0)	15.3 (59.5)	11.8 (53.3)
Source: Australian Bureau of Meteorology

== Population ==
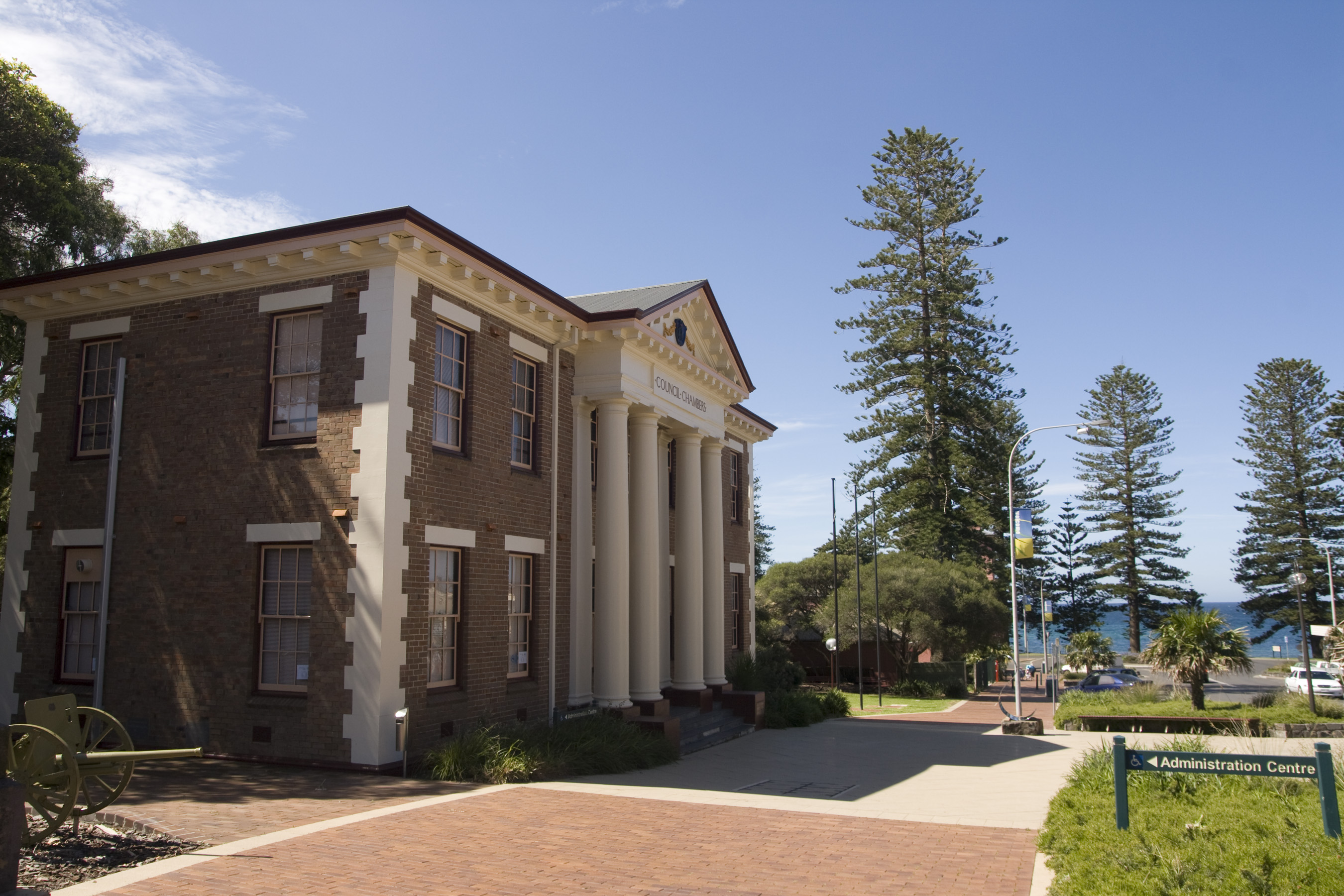
The Town Council of Kiama

At the 2021 census, Kiama had a population of 7,904.

- Aboriginal and Torres Strait Islander people made up 2.2% of the population.
- 78.0% of people were born in Australia; the next most common countries of birth were England 6.3%, New Zealand 1.4%, the United States of America 0.9%, Scotland 0.8% and Germany 0.7%.
- 89.0% of people only spoke English at home; the next most common languages spoken at home included Mandarin 0.5%, Spanish 0.5%, Greek 0.4%, German 0.4% and Cantonese 0.4%.
- The most common responses for religion were No Religion 40.0%, Catholic 22.0%, Anglican 17.6% and Uniting Church 3.1%, a further 6.4% of respondents elected not to disclose their religion.

Historical population
Year	Pop.	±%
1921	1,963	—
1933	2,426	+23.6%
1947	2,256	−7.0%
1954	2,400	+6.4%
1961	2,541	+5.9%
1966	3,814	+50.1%
1971	4,719	+23.7%
1976	4,005	−15.1%
1981	7,717	+92.7%
1986	9,184	+19.0%
1991	10,631	+15.8%
1996	11,711	+10.2%
2001	12,241	+4.5%
2006	12,286	+0.4%
2011	12,817	+4.3%
2016	13,453	+5.0%
2021	14,761	+9.7%
Source: Australian Bureau of Statistics data.

== Transport ==
The town is served by Kiama railway station, the last station to be electrified on the Illawarra railway line; the journey to Sydney takes about 2 hours 15 minutes. By road, Kiama is about 55 minutes from the southern edge of Sydney, and 100 minutes from Sydney CBD, via the Princes Highway.

Kiama was served by two tramways built to connect the Pike's Hill quarries west of the town with the harbour traversing Terralong Street. The first 3 ft 6 in (1,067 mm) was built in 1885 but never opened after financial problems were encountered with the tracks lifted in 1889. A second 2 ft (610 mm) gauge line operated from 1914 until 1941.

== Attractions ==
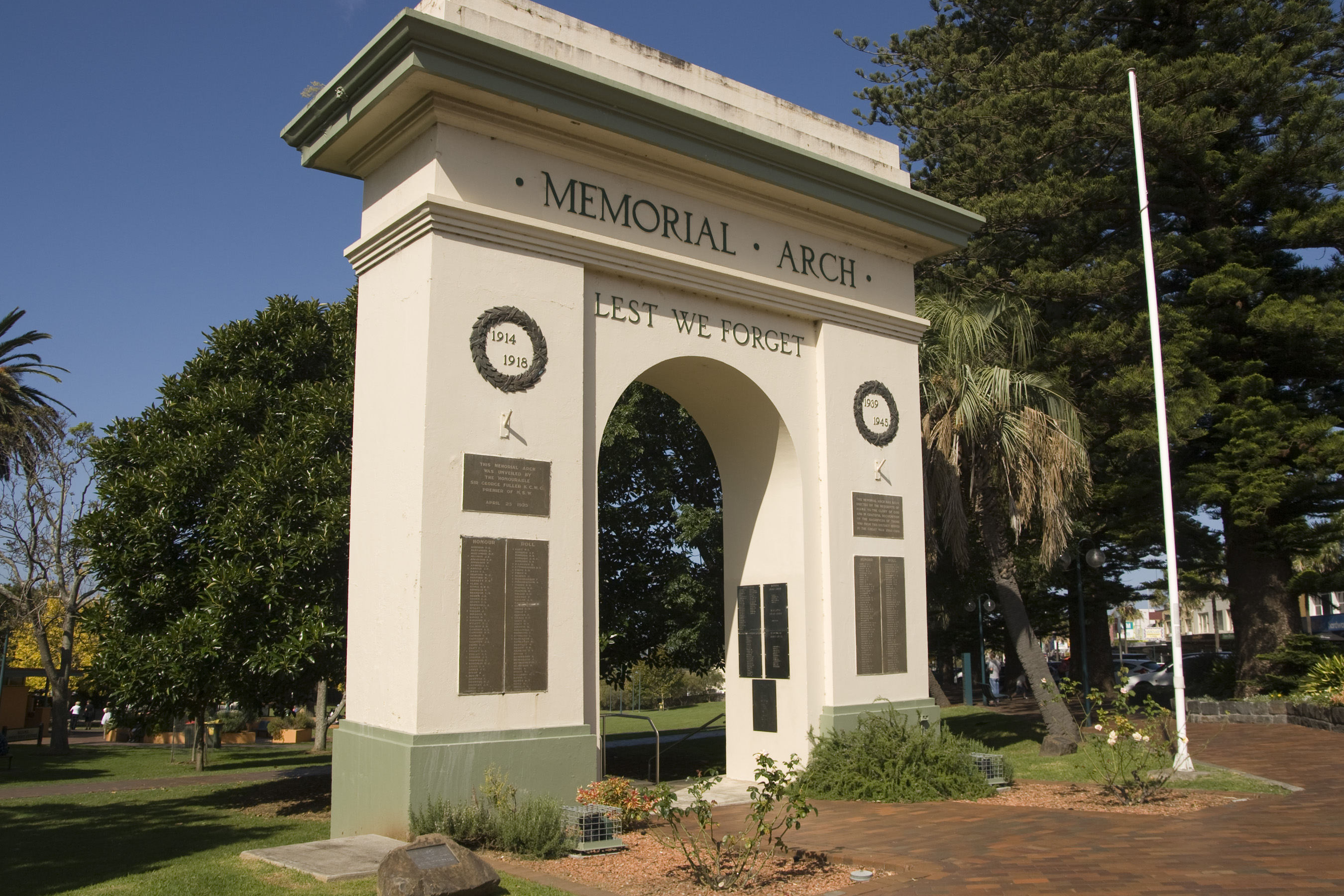
Memorial Arch

The beaches around Kiama offer a large range of surfing conditions. Many surfing competitions are held here every year. These include Boyds Beach – Kiama Downs, Bombo Beach – Bombo, Surf Beach – Kiama, Easts Beach and Caravan Park – Kiama Heights, Kendalls Beach – Kiama and Mystics Beach – Minnamurra River.

The name "Kiama" is derived from the Aboriginal word "kiarama", which means "Place where the sea makes a noise". Kiama is also known as the place where the mountains touch the sea. This is in reference to the Kiama Blowhole which attracts many visitors annually. The "Little Blowhole" is a lesser known blowhole as it does not share the same central location or the scale associated with the larger Kiama Blowhole. The Little Blowhole is on a headland south of the central part of Kiama between Easts and Kendalls Beaches.

Both have areas for viewing, though the Kiama Blowhole attracts more tourists. A coastal walking track currently allows people to walk from Minnamurra to Easts Beach, past both blowholes. A 7 kilometre southern extension to this path has been opened to allow people to walk along the cliffs to Gerringong.

A few kilometres north at Bombo is Cathedral Rocks, a formation well known and visited, with a walk/cycleway going along the Kiama coast. There are other rock formations on these cliff headlands of moderate renown.

The Kiama Post Office, one of many historic buildings, is known for its history and pink colour, although it was repainted in 2012. It is situated near Black Beach.

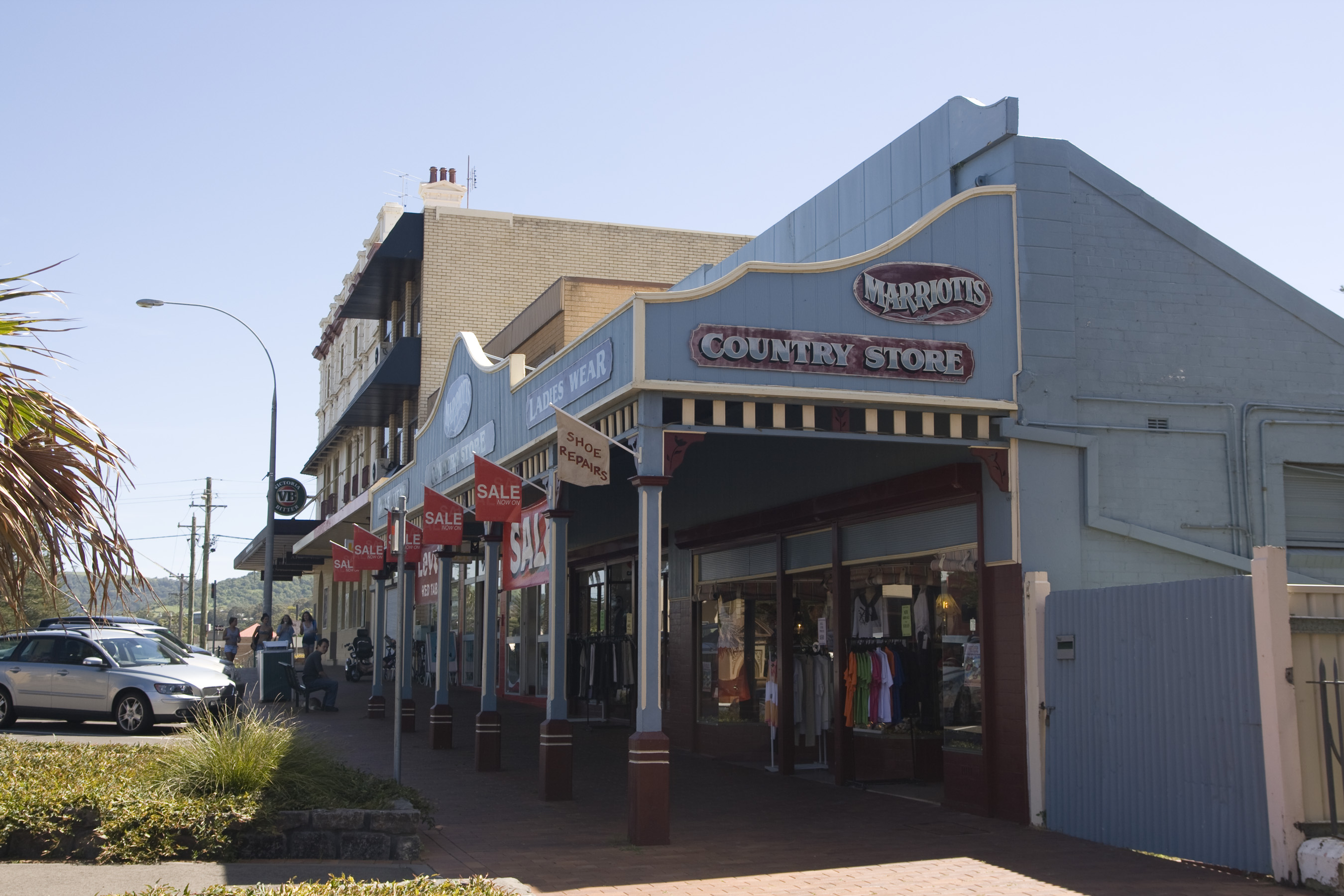
Historic shopfronts

Kiama has a country-style strip mall of cafés, restaurants, art galleries and shops on Terralong Street. Also on this street is a war memorial, an historic fire station used for exhibits, and a small shopping centre. There is a strong arts following and interest in cultural events in Kiama, and in 2013 an arts trail was introduced to showcase the work of individual artists, together with regular arts events in the area. Food and wine trails are also becoming more popular in the area.

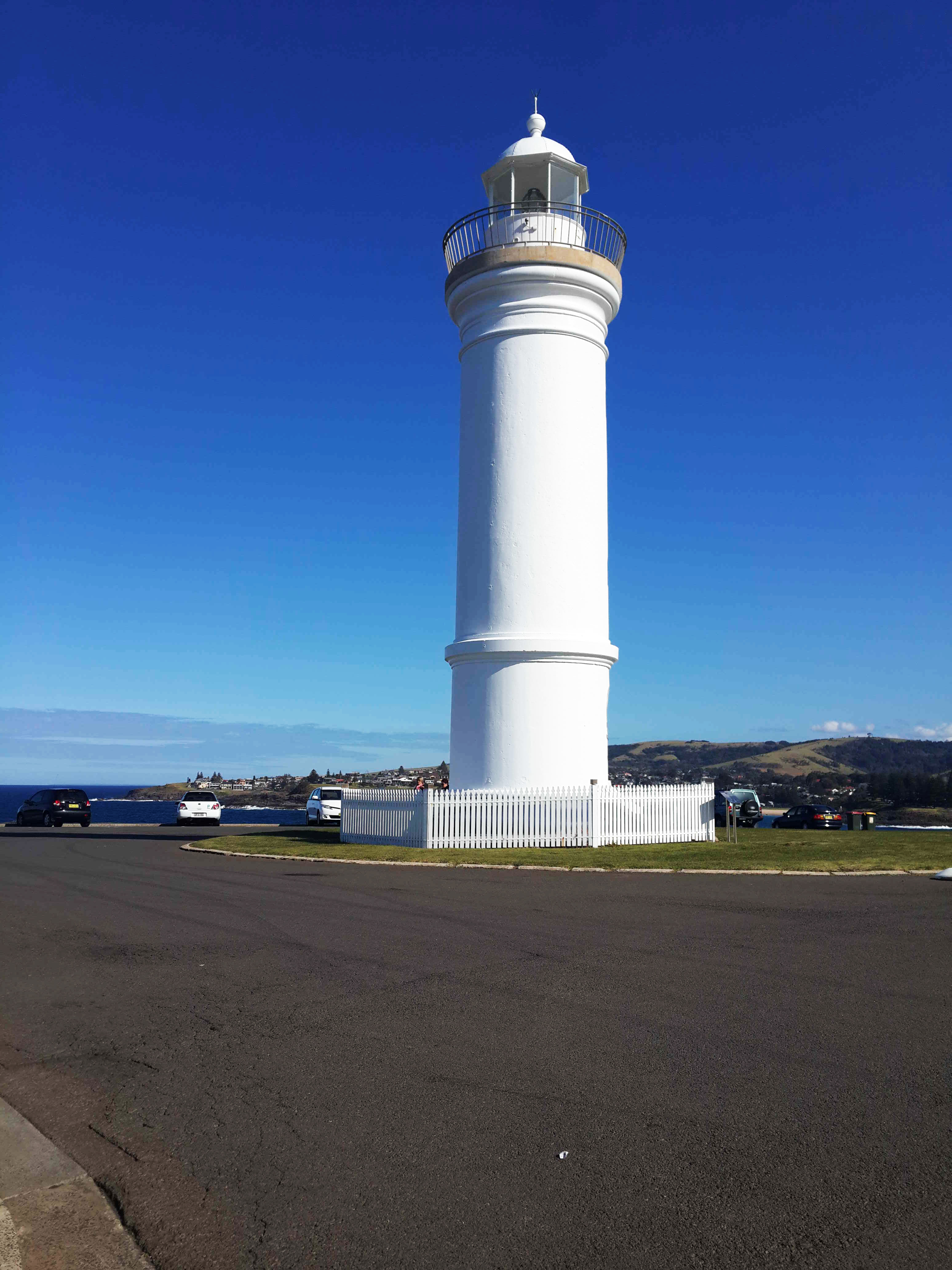
Kiama Lighthouse

Kiama Lighthouse, on Blowhole Point, was built in 1887 and is situated close to the Kiama Blowhole. The point also contains a heritage pilot's cottage and a tourist information centre. North West of the Blowhole is Kiama Harbour, home to fishing boats and seafood market where you can buy local fish. The point also contains seaside cabins and a rock pool.

A locally famous phenomenon is the local group of Australian Pelicans. The pelicans have been honoured with a metal statue at the harbour.

Seven kilometres southwest of the town is Saddleback Lookout atop the 600-metre high Saddleback Mountain with views over the Illawarra Plains and escarpment and south to Nowra, Pigeon House Mountain and Coolangatta Mountain. Saddleback and Noorinan mountains provide an impressive backdrop to the city.

The Jamberoo Action Park, a mainly ride-orientated water-themed park, is situated 10 minutes inland of Kiama in the small town of Jamberoo.

West of Kiama in the green hills lies Jerrara Dam, built in the 1800s to supply water to the area. It is now a reserve.

North of the Minnamurra River is Killalea Recreation Area, a nature reserve on Bass Point. It is south of Shellharbour.

Kiama Council spent eleven years preparing the construction of the Kiama Coast Walk, a six-kilometre track extending from Loves Bay, north of Kiama, to Werri Lagoon, near Gerringong, south of Kiama. Some coastal land was declared public reserve to allow the public to walk through what was previously private property. The track was scheduled to open in October 2009 and was expected to be a popular drawcard for the public.

== Education ==
Kiama is home to several schools, including Kiama High School, Kiama Public School and Ss Peter and Paul Catholic School. Two vocational education and training (VET) providers also have their headquarters in Kiama, the Kiama Community College and National Training Masters. The local TAFE NSW College is located at Shellharbour.

== Notable people ==
- Prof David Balding (born 1961), Fellow of the Australian Academy of Science, Professor of Statistical Genomics at the University of Melbourne
- Joseph Carruthers (1857–1932), 16th Premier of New South Wales
- Charmian Clift (1923–1969), writer and essayist
- Mick Cronin (born 1951), rugby league player
- Sir George Fuller (1861–1940), 22nd Premier of New South Wales
- Orry-Kelly (1897–1964), Academy Award-winning dress designer
- Bill Knott (1921–2013), represented Kiama as a member of the NSW Legislative Assembly from 1981 to 1986
- Peter Knott (born 1956), represented Gilmore from 1993 to 1996 for the Australian Labor Party
- Robbie Maddison (born 1981), freestyle motocross rider
- Brett Morris and Josh Morris (born 1986), professional rugby league players
- Mitch Rein (born 1990), rugby league player

== See also ==
- Hoddles Track
- Stone Fleet (New South Wales)
