= Kiama Masonic Temple =

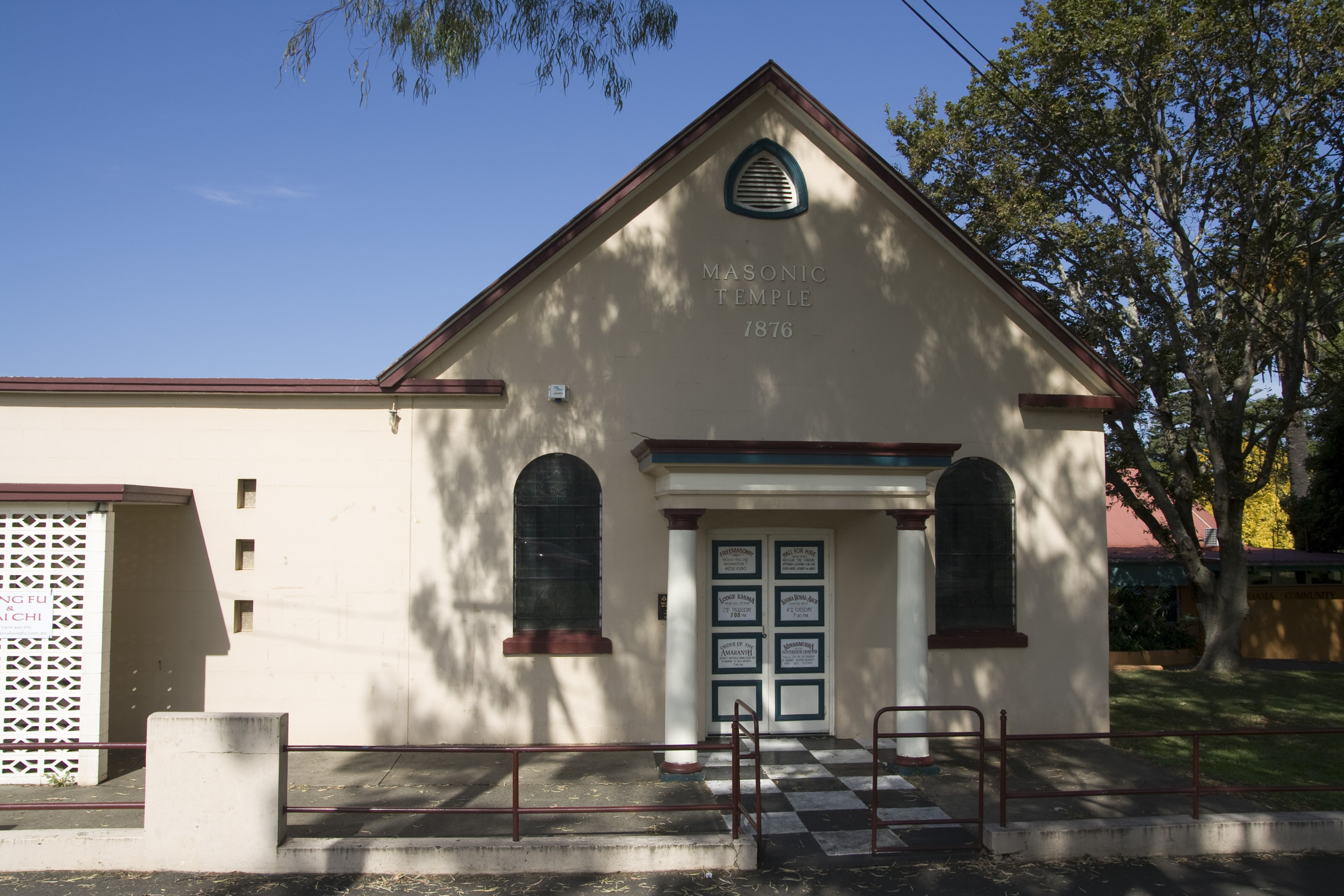

- Location within New South Wales Location within Australia
- 34.6688°S 150.8536°E
- Location: 46 Collins Street, Kiama, New South Wales, Australia

History
- Built: 1870–1880

Site notes
- Owner: Kiama Masonic Lodge

New South Wales Heritage Register
- Official name: Masonic Temple; Temperance Hall
- Type: state heritage (built)
- Designated: 2 April 1999
- Reference no.: 474
- Type: Hall Masonic
- Category: Community Facilities

Kiama Masonic Temple is a heritage-listed masonic temple and former temperance hall at 46 Collins Street, Kiama, New South Wales, Australia. It was built from 1876 to 1878 with alterations in 1908-09. It is also known as Temperance Hall. The property is owned by Kiama Masonic Lodge. It was added to the New South Wales State Heritage Register on 2 April 1999.

== History ==
The building was built as a Temperance Hall between 1876 and 1878 by contractor James Dinning at a reputed cost of £1500, on land purchased from William Geogheghan. It was operated by the National Division of the Sons of Temperance. It was sold to J. H. Somerville in 1899, who continued to run the venue as a public hall. It was sold to the Freemasons in 1908. The Freemasons renovated the property, adding stained glass windows and decorative friezes, removing the gallery and converting the former stage into a supper-room.

It still serves as a Masonic Lodge in 2018. Lodge Kiama No. 35 has been meeting continuously in the building since 1909.

== Description ==
The temple is a simple rectangular building of rendered brick. The porch has a simple Classical arrangement of Doric columns and architrave. The central entrance is flanked by round-headed windows. There is an unsympathetic recent addition on the north side.

== Heritage listing ==
This is one of about half a dozen buildings of 1870s or earlier date in the central area of the town. It has social history significance as evidence of the expansion of Kiama's institutions following the starting of the stone crushing industry in 1871. It is a sympathetic neighbour to the other 19th century buildings in the vicinity which are an important reminder of the former townscape character of Kiama and its history as a quarrying town.

Kiama Masonic Temple was listed on the New South Wales State Heritage Register on 2 April 1999.
