= Kiama Pioneer Butter Factory =

Historic site in Australia

The Kiama Pioneer Butter Factory was erected in 1883 and later officially opened on 18 June 1884 in Kiama, New South Wales. It is credited with being the first factory in Australia to use cream separators, a machine that would transform processing techniques in the dairy industry. The Kiama Pioneer Butter Factory was also the first factory in Australia to make a shipment of butter to Great Britain.

== History ==
A ceremony to commemorate the official opening of the factory was held on 18 June 1884. At the ceremony, the cream separator was christened by Mr. W. Grey, Chairman of Directors. The separator was immediately put to use with 40 gallons of milk separated in 20 minutes. Following the official ceremony, a dinner was held with Mr. W. Grey presiding and Mr. James Colley, Mayor, and D. L. Dymock in the vice-chairs. Speeches were made by Mr. W. Grey, James Colley, D. L. Dymock, J. Weston and R. Miller.

Though absent from the period of construction of the factory owing to his travels in Europe and the United States in search of innovations in dairy practices and machinery, Mr. D. L. Dymock - a prominent figure in the early dairy industry in Australia- made the following comment in a speech given at the ceremony: "Although I have not the honour of being on the Pioneer Factory Company, I nevertheless had the pleasure of being in London on the Aylesbury Dairy Company's premises and saw the Pioneer separators being packed for shipment to Australia. My pleasure, if not my pride, was intensified when on inquiry, I was told that these separators were destined for a place known as Kiama on the South Coast of New South Wales.

The building used for the Pioneer Butter Factory was purchased by the Fresh Food and Ice Company for use as a milk depot, in 1897. It fell into disuse when the attraction of the Sydney markets drew milk supplies from surrounding farms away from the factory.

The precise date of the closure of the factory is not known, however, it is written to have occurred in the early part of the twentieth century. The factory building was demolished in 1936.

== Accomplishments ==
The Kiama Pioneer Butter Factory is recognized as being the first factory in Australia to have a consignment of butter sent to Great Britain in 1885. At that time, all shipping and consignment arrangements were fulfilled by the Fresh Food and Ice Company. The shipment was consigned in half to Weddell & Co and Covey & Co, both based in London. The butter reached London in a satisfactory condition, which raised the call for full and regular supplies. This was a momentous outcome for the shipment, as it is noted that previously butter products had been sent not for consumption, but to be sold on to soap makers.

The Pioneer factory was the first in Australia to use the cream separators. The machine was of Danish manufacture and it was introduced following a tour of Europe and the United States by Mr. D. L. Dymock, who had been supported financially by local dairy farmers. The cream separator arrived in Australia on the SS Chimbarazo which docked in Sydney Harbour. Two separators were purchased on the trip, with the other destined for use at the other factory owned by the Fresh Food and Ice Company. The introduction of the cream separators into Australia by Mr. D.L. Dymock occurred in conjunction with Mr. Thomas Sutcliffe Mort, an Australian industrialist, who is also more frequently recognized for improving the design of refrigeration for use in keeping meat and dairy products.

== Directors ==
The provisional directors of the company were: William Grey (father of George Grey of 'Greyleigh'), chairman, Thomas Honey, George Wood Jr., W. Winley, W. Boles, with H. Honey as Secretary.

When the company was finally established it was named Kiama Pioneer Co-operative Produce Factory Company Ltd. Its directors were William Grey, Joseph Weston, H. Honey, Joseph Pike and George Wood Jr.
