= Kiama Blowhole =

Blowhole in New South Wales, Australia

Coordinates: 34°40′18.5″S 150°51′47″E

The Kiama Blowhole is a blowhole in the town of Kiama, New South Wales, Australia. The name 'Kiama' has long been translated as "where the sea makes a noise". It is one of the town's major tourist attractions. Under certain sea conditions, the blowhole can spray 50 litres of water up to 25 metres (82 ft) in the air, in quantities that thoroughly drench any bystanders. There is a second, less famous blowhole in Kiama, commonly referred to as the "Little Blowhole" by locals. It is much smaller than the other (called the "Big Blowhole"), but due to its narrow shape, it is more reliable than the Big Blowhole, and in the right conditions can be equally spectacular.

The blowhole attracts 900,000 tourists a year. Kiama Blowhole is just a few metres beyond the coastline. The "little blowhole" is located at the Little Blowhole Reserve, Tingira Crescent, Kiama, 2 km south of the main blowhole.

== History ==
The blowhole was formed from basalt lava flows approximately 260 million years ago and was first discovered by local Aboriginals who named it 'Khanterinte'. The blowhole was first written about by George Bass on 6 December 1797. Bass had captained a crew of six and set out on an open whaleboat to explore the south coast of Australia. He noticed the blowhole after anchoring his boat in a sheltered bay.

In 1992 seven people were drowned when a freak wave washed two Afghan families off the rocks, a tragedy compounded five years later when two more members of one of the families died at the picturesque site.

Despite the local council erecting fences and signs to the danger, tourists can still regularly be seen standing perilously close to the edge as the water explodes through the opening.

== Cause ==
According to the placard at the blow hole, water shoots out of the blowhole because of pressure that forms in an underground chamber. As water fills the chamber at the end of the tunnel, pressure builds. When waves subside, the pressure inside the chamber pushes water up through the blow hole.

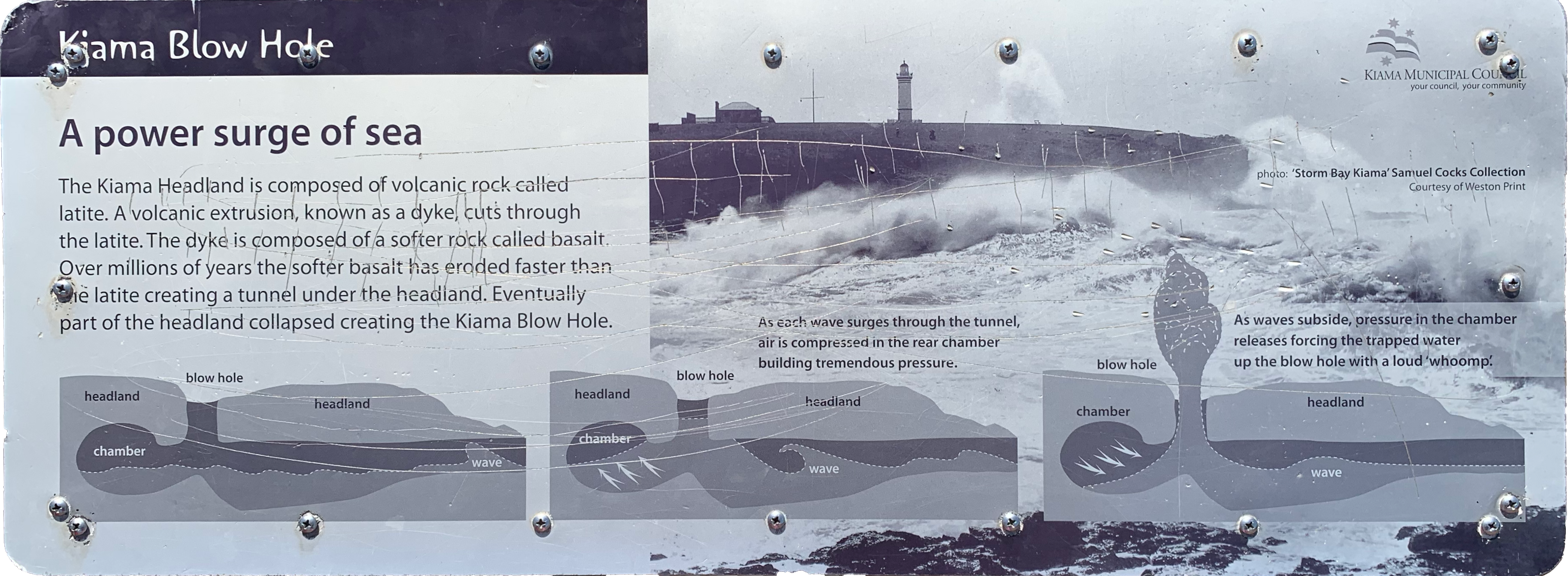
Informational placard at Kiama Blow Hole

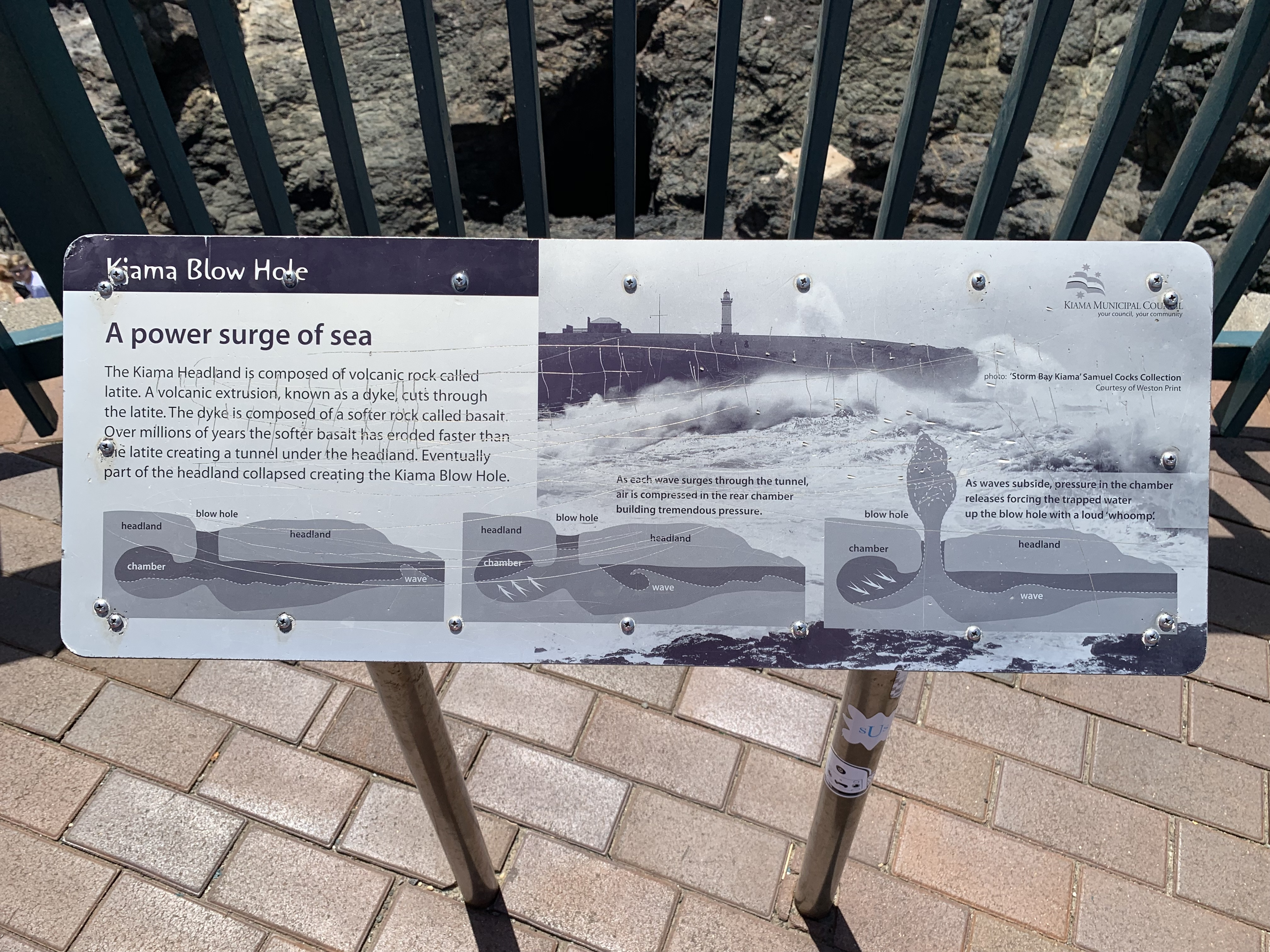
Informational placard at Kiama Blow Hole explaining what causes the water to erupt

== Gallery ==
The Kiama Blowholes

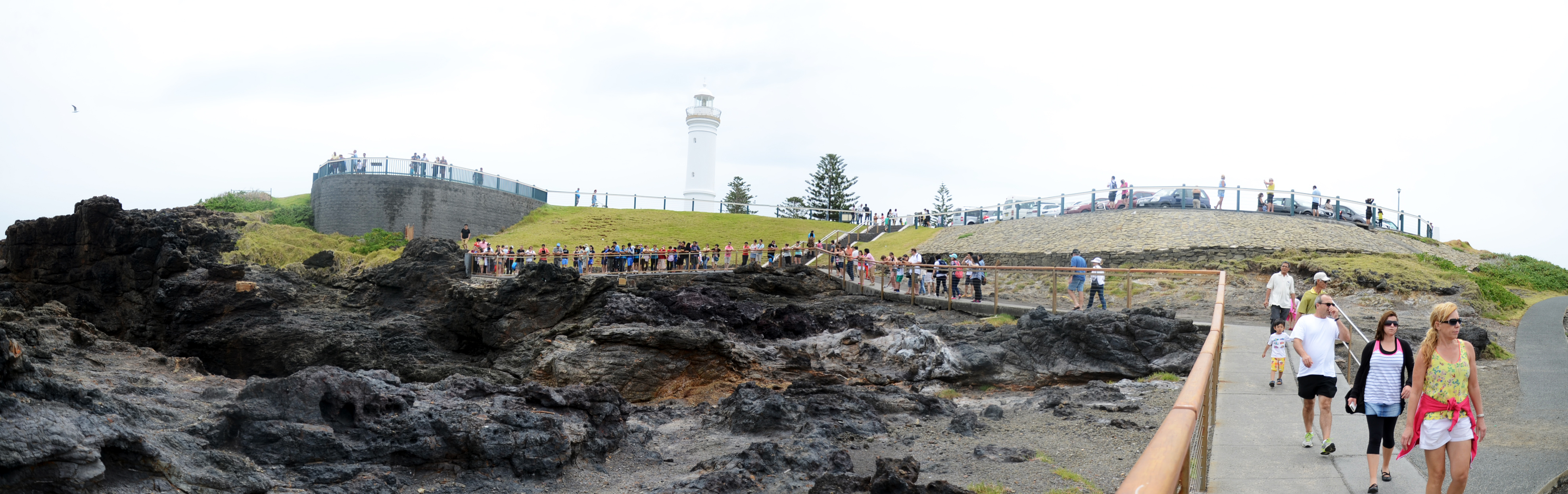
Kiama blowhole panorama

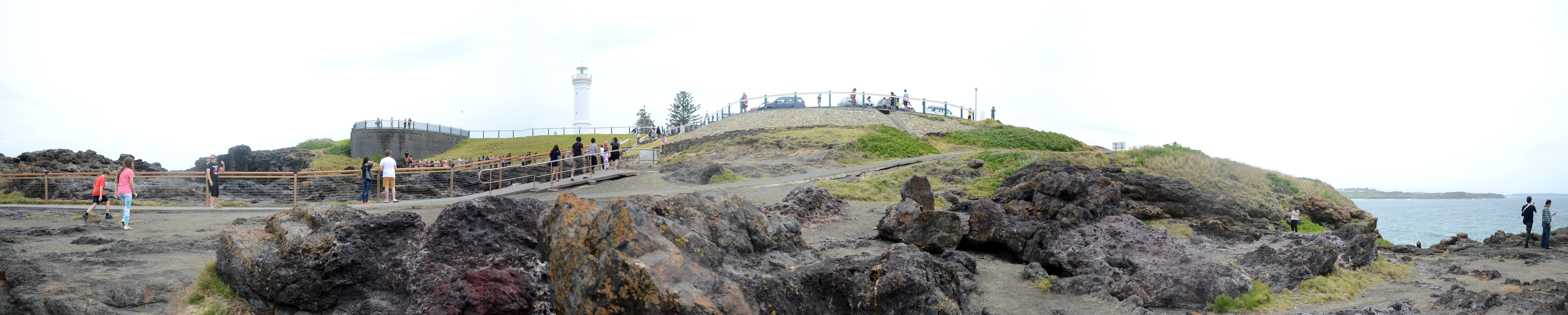
Kiama blowhole panoramic view, NSW

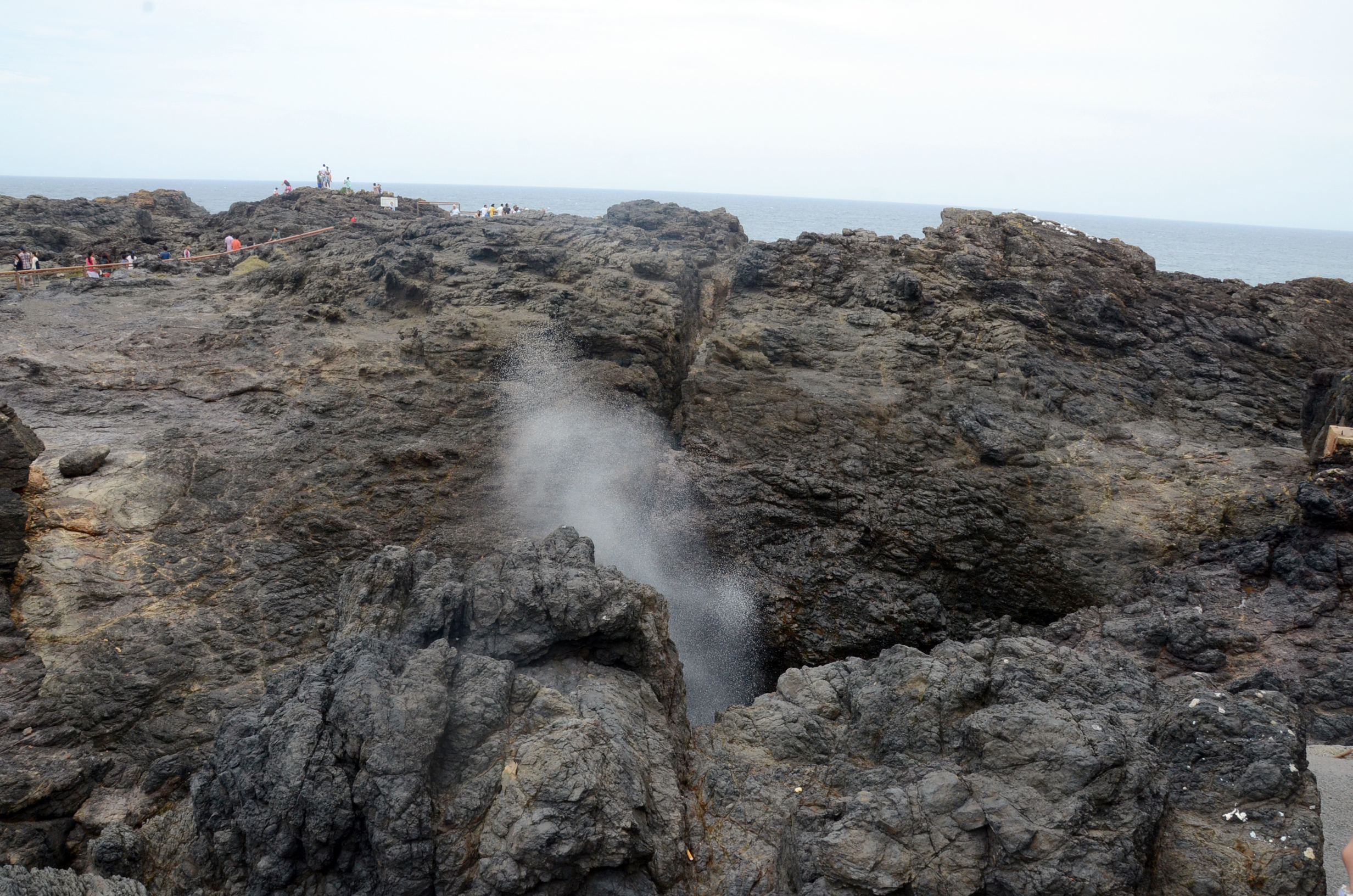
Kiama blowhole, NSW

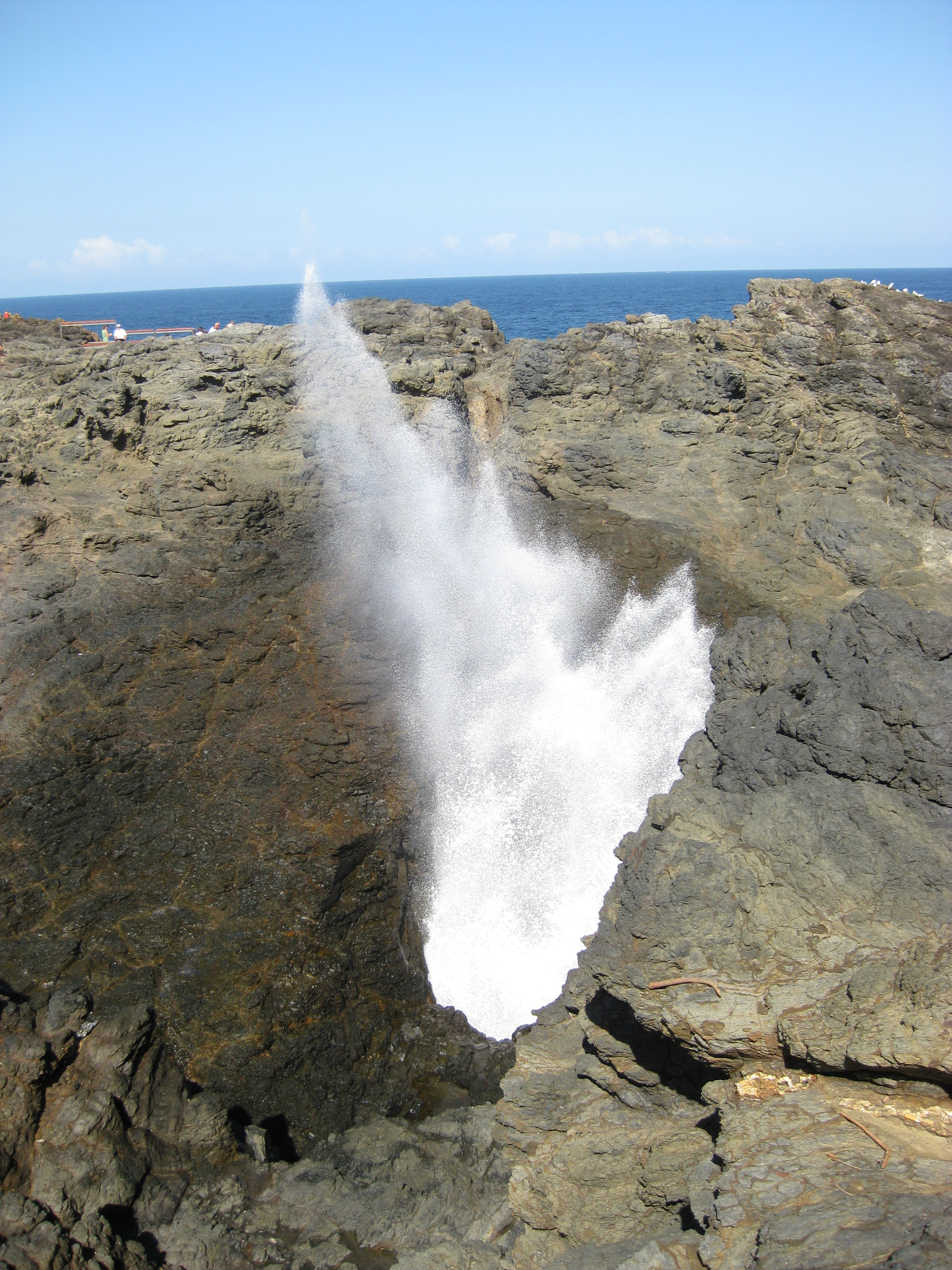
Kiama Blowhole in action

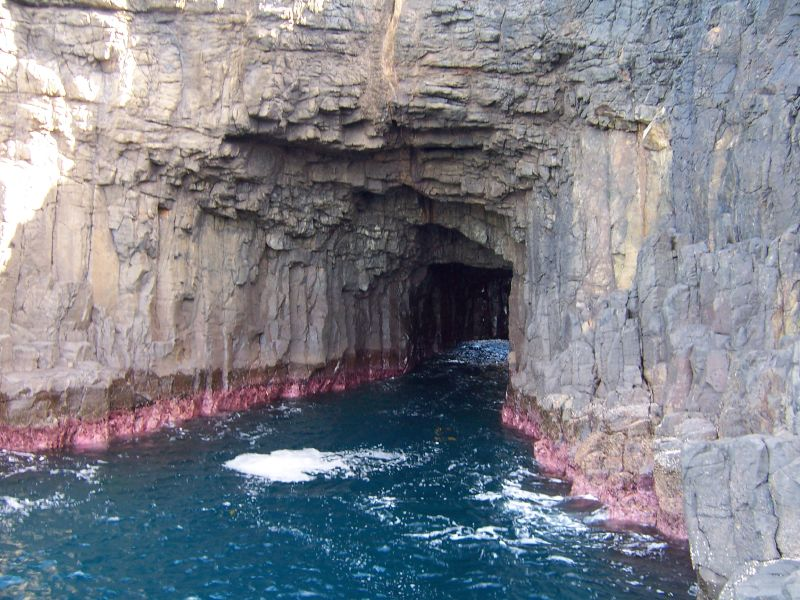
Kiama Blowhole sea cave entrance

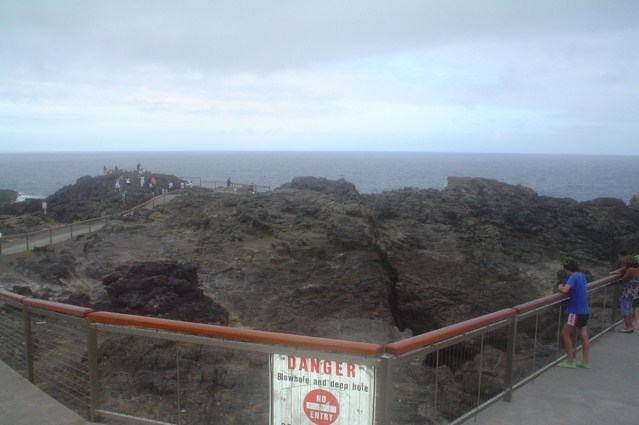
Kiama Blowhole site

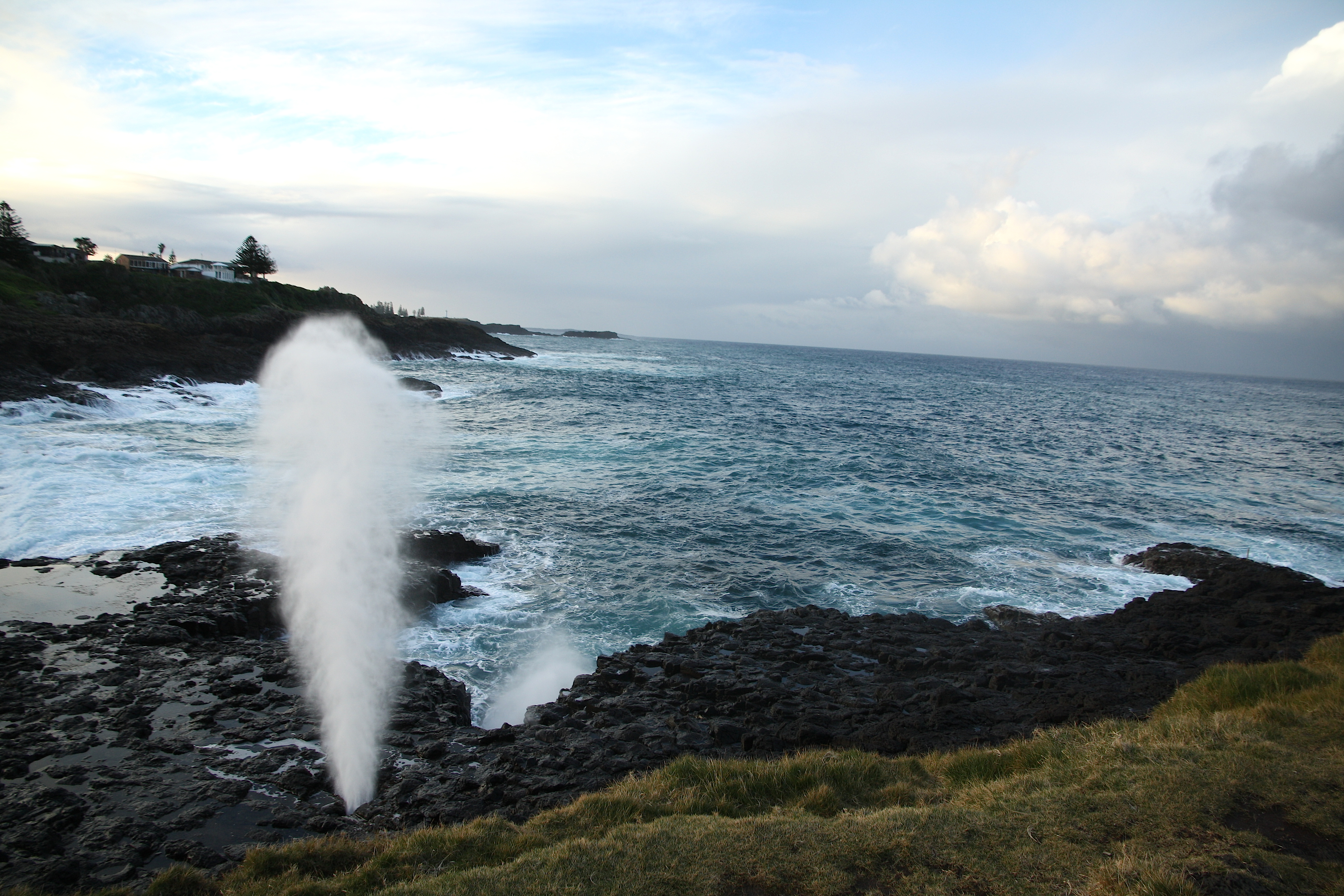
The Little Blowhole in action
