= Illawarra Plains =

The Illawarra Plains are a group of broad coastal plains in the Illawarra region of New South Wales, Australia. They are home to a diverse group of native plants and animals.
