= Foxground =

- Town
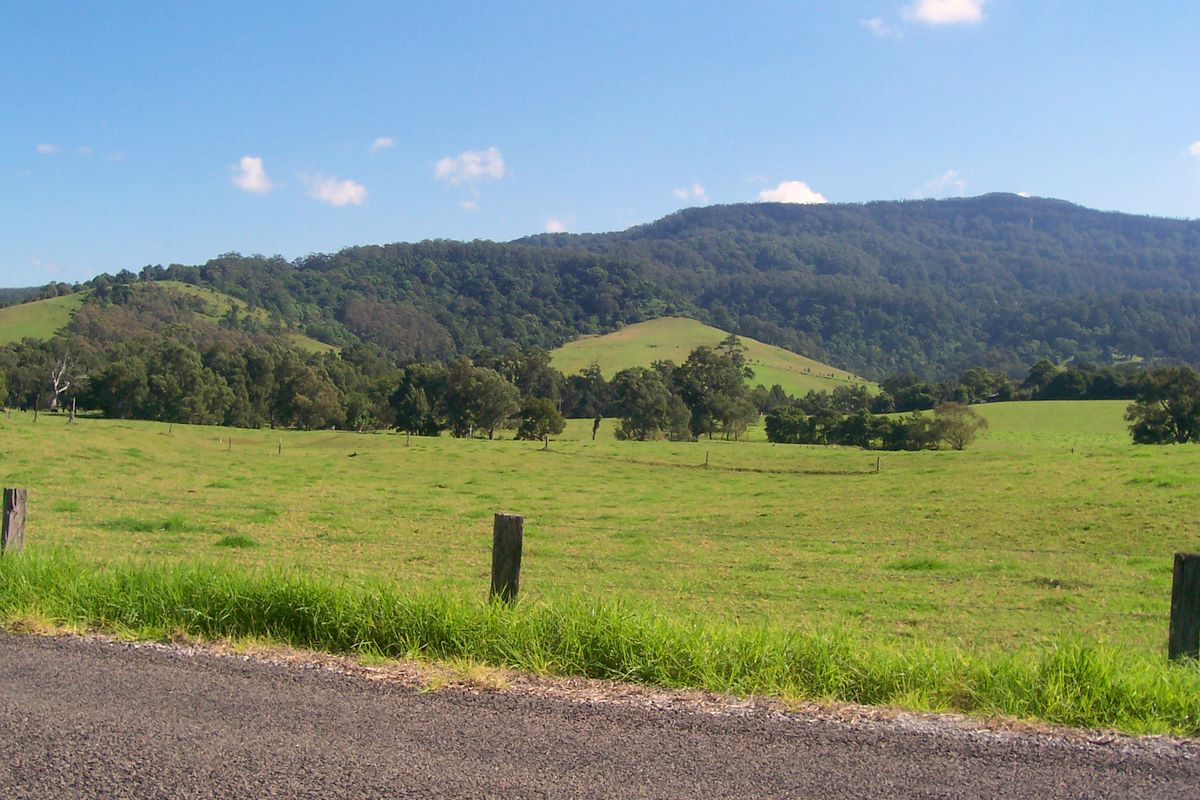
- Foxground Valley

- Coordinates: 34°43.04124′S 150°46.23888′E
- Country: Australia
- State: New South Wales
- LGA: Municipality of Kiama
- Location: 20 km (12 mi) SW of Kiama; 39 km (24 mi) NE of Nowra; 139 km (86 mi) SSW of Sydney

Government
  - State electorate: Kiama
  - Federal division: Gilmore
- Elevation: 77 m (253 ft)

Population
  - Total: 164 (2021 census)
- Postcode: 2534
Localities around Foxground
Barren Grounds	Jamberoo	Saddleback Mountain
Barren Grounds	Foxground	Rose Valley
Broughton Vale	Broughton Village	Willow Vale

Foxground is a locality in the Municipality of Kiama, in the Illawarra region of New South Wales, Australia. It is located two kilometres from the Princes Highway, 20 kilometres south west of Kiama. Broughton Creek flows through the valley.

The name Foxground is derived from the once abundant grey-headed flying foxes. Foxground was originally known as "The Flying Foxes Camping Ground". The indigenous people of this area are from the Wadi Wadi and Yuin tribes. The first white men to explore the valley were likely to be cedar cutters in the 1820s or possibly earlier. As early as 1814, cedar cutters explored the area around nearby Gerringong. In 1890 explosions were detonated in an attempt to remove the flying foxes.

After clearing of the rainforest, the area was used mostly for dairy farms. The first white settler was John Blow. His original house was built from split timber slabs, with a bark roof. However, as his circumstances improved, he built a new home, "Willow Glen", which still stands today.

An attractive rural valley; now without the shops, school, churches, or the combined milk depot/post office of the past. The school closed in 1950. The Church of England structure was built in 1873, and destroyed by fire in 1954. A Wesleyan church was built in 1861, and sold in 1901.

Photographer Jeff Carter moved onto a 45-hectare abandoned farm in the area with his Californian wife Mare in 1962 and together they set up a wildlife sanctuary, which is documented in her book A Wild Life — Bringing up a Bush Menagerie.

The relatively fertile soils and generous rainfall produced high quality sub-tropical rainforest in the area. Significant species include Australian red cedar, camphorwood, yellow ash, deciduous fig, and Illawarra plum. The rare socketwood occurs here in private property. Average annual rainfall at nearby Kiama is 1,256 mm. However, in 1950 Foxground received 4,263 mm, one of the highest annual rainfalls ever recorded in New South Wales.

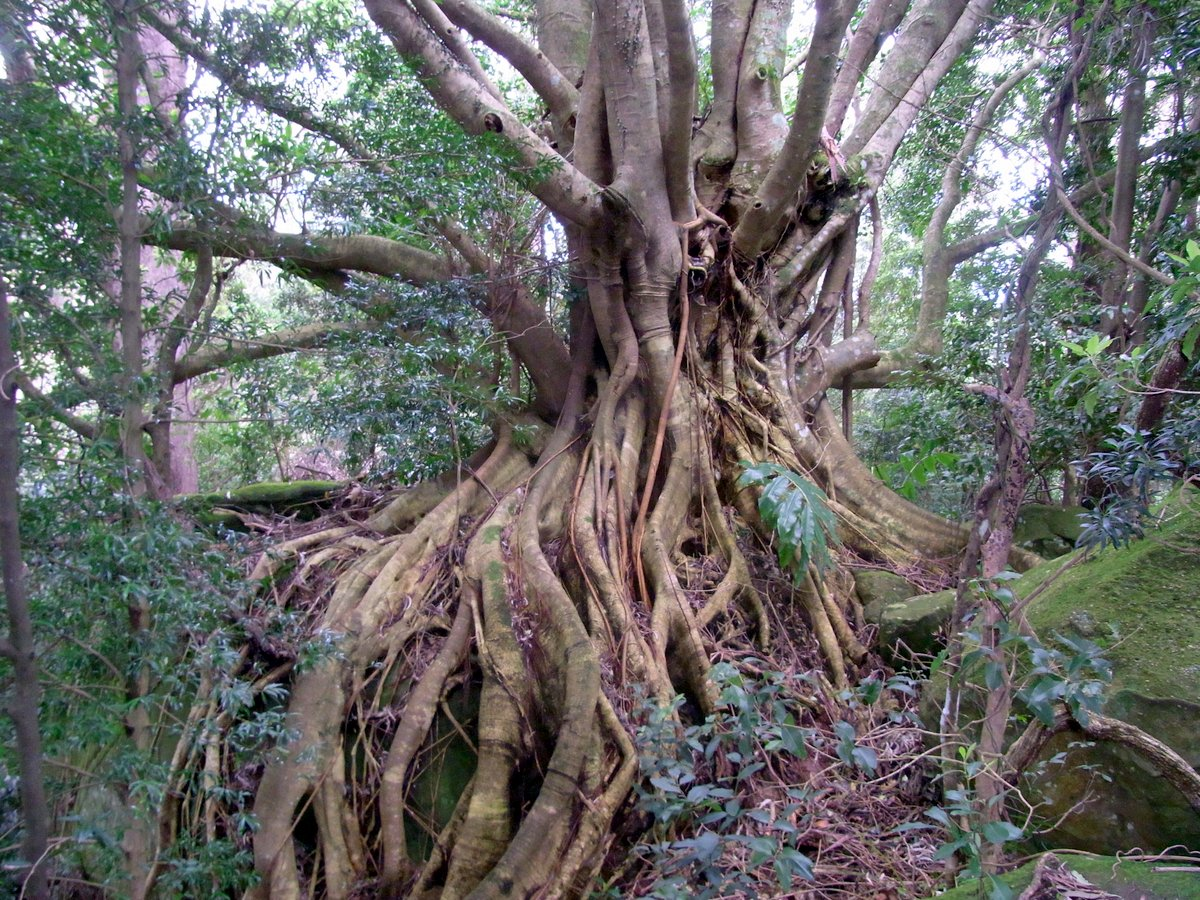
Deciduous fig in private property at Foxground

== See also ==
- Hoddles Track
