= Crooked River (New South Wales) =

River in Australia

Coordinates: 34°45′S 150°47′E

Location
- Country: Australia
- State: New South Wales
- Region: Sydney Basin (IBRA), Illawarra
- Local government areas: Kiama

Physical characteristics
- Source: Currys Mountain
  - location: southwest of Gerringong
- Mouth: Tasman Sea, South Pacific Ocean
  - location: Gerroa
- Length: 8 km (5.0 mi)
- Basin size: 32 km^{2} (12 sq mi)

Basin features
- Tributaries
  - right: Blue Angle Creek
- National park: Seven Mile Beach

The Crooked River, officially designated as a creek, is an open mature wave dominated barrier estuary located in the Illawarra region of New South Wales, Australia.

== Location and features ==
Crooked River rises to the southeast of Princes Highway and the South Coast railway line, west southwest of Currys Mountain and southwest of Gerringong. The creek flows generally east southeast and south for about 8 kilometres (5.0 mi) reaching its mouth at Gerroa, where the creek borders Seven Mile Beach National Park and flows into the Tasman Sea of the South Pacific Ocean.

== See also ==
- List of rivers of Australia § New South Wales
- List of rivers of New South Wales (A–K)
- Rivers of New South Wales
