= Minnamurra railway station =

Railway station in New South Wales, Australia

Minnamurra
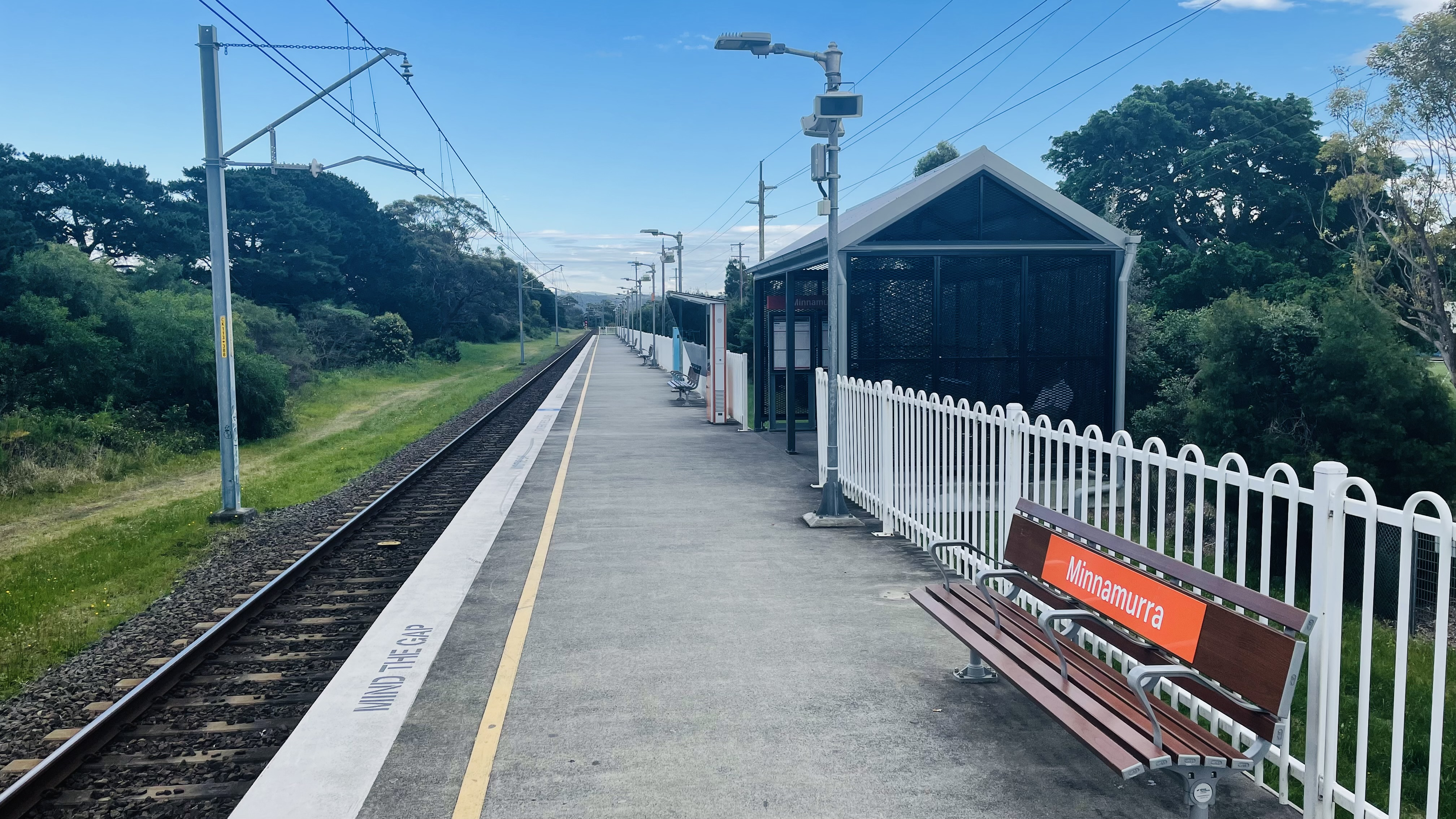
- Northbound view from the station platform, October 2022

General information
- Location: Railway Avenue, Minnamurra; New South Wales; Australia
- Coordinates: 34.6257°S 150.8522°E
- Elevation: 7 metres (23 ft)
- Owner: Transport Asset Manager of New South Wales
- Line: South Coast
- Distance: 113.372 kilometres (70.446 mi) from Central
- Platforms: 1, 195 metres
- Train operators: Sydney Trains

Construction
- Structure type: At-grade
- Cycle facilities: Yes
- Accessible: Yes

Other information
- Website: Transport for NSW

History
- Opened: 23 December 1891
- Rebuilt: 10 October 1943
- Electrified: 17 November 2001

Passengers
- 2025: 52,677 (year); 144 (daily) (Sydney Trains, NSW TrainLink)

Services
Preceding station	Intercity Trains	Following station
Bombo towards Kiama	South Coast Line	Shellharbour Junction towards Central or Bondi Junction
Location

Minnamurra railway station is a single-platform intercity train station located in Minnamurra, New South Wales, Australia, on the South Coast railway line. The station serves Sydney Trains traveling south to Kiama and north to Wollongong and Sydney.

While the railway line through Minnamurra opened in 1887, the station didn't open until four years later. In 1943, it moved to its present location. The station has no platform building and is not staffed. Electric multiple unit trains began to service the station from November 2001.

Despite some interest from local politicians, a perennial proposal to close Minnamurra and Bombo stations in favour of a new stop in the centre of Kiama Downs has not progressed.

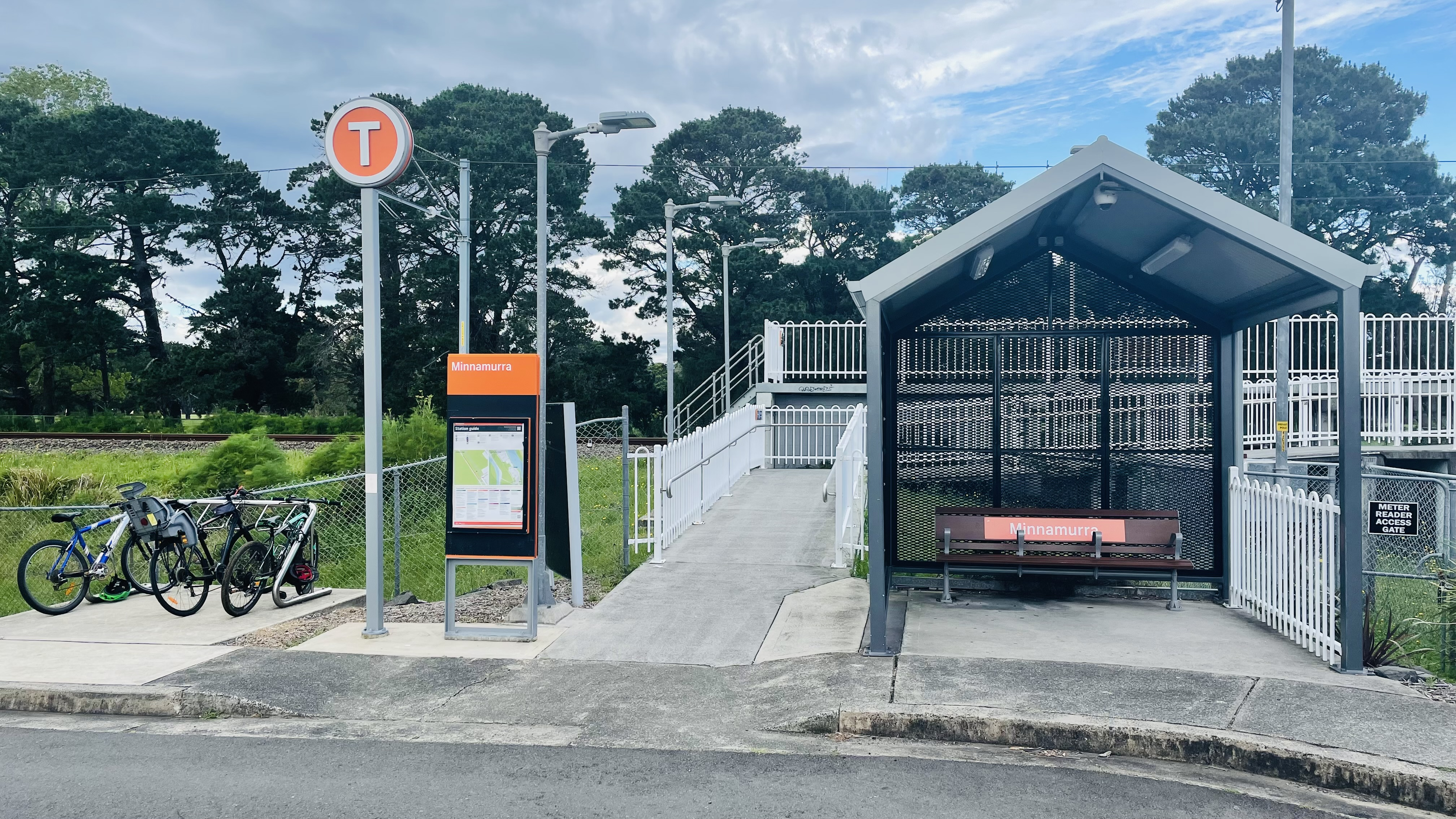
Entrance on Railway Avenue

== Platforms and services ==
Platform	Line	Stopping pattern	Notes
1	South Coast Line	services to Sydney Central, Bondi Junction & Kiama	
