= Werri Beach =

- Town
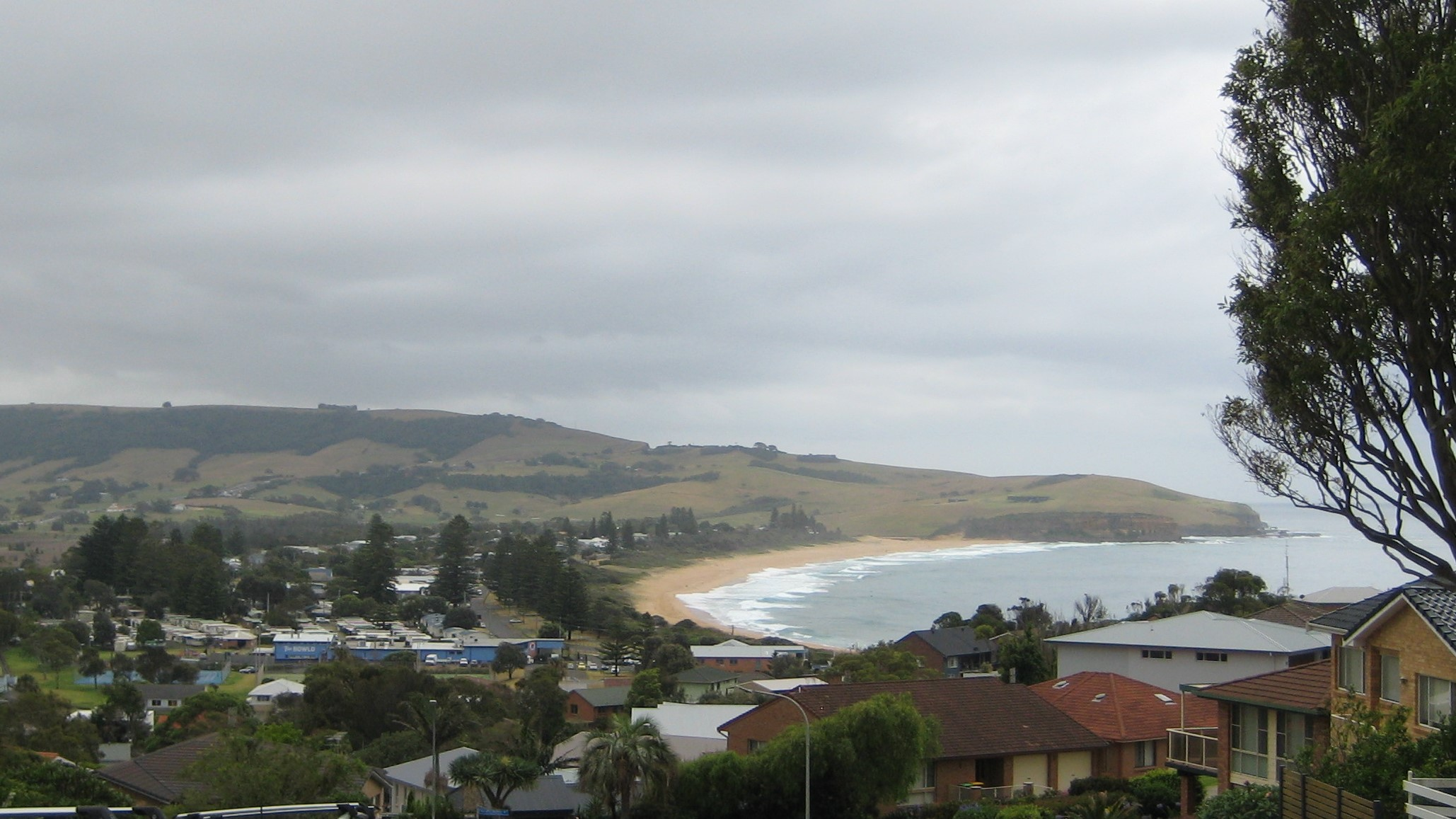
- View of Gerringong, Werri Beach and surrounding Headlands

- Coordinates: 34°43′47″S 150°50′02″E
- Country: Australia
- State: New South Wales
- LGA: Municipality of Kiama
- Location: 12 km (7.5 mi) S of Kiama; 35 km (22 mi) NE of Nowra; 141 km (88 mi) S of Sydney

Government
  - State electorate: Kiama
  - Federal division: Gilmore
- Elevation: 9 m (30 ft)

Population
  - Total: 510 (2021 census)
- Postcode: 2534
Localities around Werri Beach
| Rose Valley | Kiama Heights | Tasman Sea |
| Gerringong | Werri Beach | Tasman Sea |
| Gerringong | Gerringong | Tasman Sea |

Werri Beach is a town in the Illawarra, south of Kiama and immediately north of Gerringong in New South Wales, Australia. It is located on the coast of the Tasman Sea to the east of the Princes Highway. At the 2021 census, it had a population of 510.

The name Werri is derived from Ouiree or Ooaree, which is the Dharawal word for the creek that enters the beach on the northern side.
