= Kiama Heights =

- Suburb
- Interactive map of Kiama Heights
- Coordinates: 34°42′14″S 150°50′23″E
- Country: Australia
- State: New South Wales
- City: Kiama
- LGA: Municipality of Kiama

Government
  - State electorate: Kiama
  - Federal division: Gilmore

Population
  - Total: 878 (2021 census)
- Postcode: 2533
Suburbs around Kiama Heights
Jerrara	Kiama
Saddleback Mountain	Kiama Heights	Tasman Sea
Rose Valley	Gerringong

Kiama Heights is a semi-rural locality in the Illawarra, south of Kiama in New South Wales, Australia. It is located on the coast of the Tasman Sea on either side of the Princes Highway. At the 2021 census, it had a population of 878.

== Climate ==
The climate is humid subtropical (Köppen: Cfa), but areas like Bare Bluff or the Billys Lookout Observatory in the southern extreme have an oceanic climate (Cfb), being the northernmost places in this climatic category along the Australian coast.
