= C. oliveri =

C. oliveri may refer to:

- Cinnamomum oliveri, a rainforest tree growing at the eastern coastal parts of Australia
- Commiphora oliveri, a synonym for Commiphora angolensis, a shrub species found in Angola

== See also ==
- Oliveri (disambiguation)
