= Jones Beach (New South Wales) =

Beach in New South Wales, Australia

Jones
- Beach
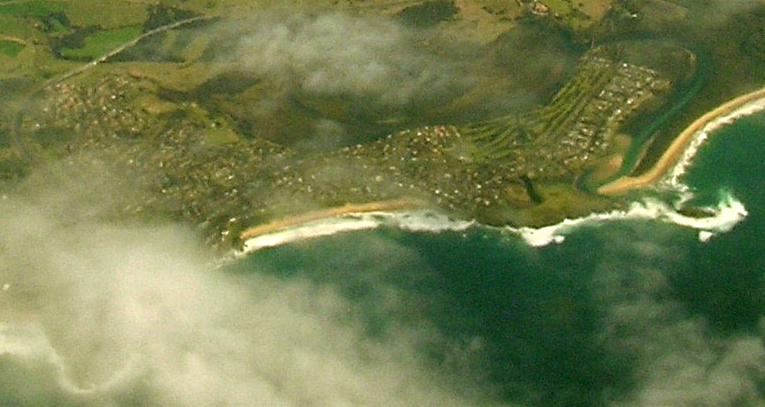
- Jones Beach visible in the centre of the picture, with Kiama Downs (left) and Minnamurra (right).

- Location within Australia
- Coordinates: 34°37′54″S 150°51′4″E
- Location: Kiama, Illawarra / South Coast, Australia

Jones Beach, also known as Boyds Beach, is a beach on the south-eastern coast of Australia, facing the Tasman Sea. The beach is east of the settlement of Kiama Downs and about 2 kilometres (1.2 mi) south by east of the settlement of Minnamurra in the Illawarra and South Coast regions of New South Wales.

== Description ==
Jones Beach is a relatively straight east-facing white sand beach that is about 900 metres (3,000 ft) long, located between Minnamurra Point, a 30-metre (98 ft) high headland, and basalt columns of the southern Cathedral Rocks. The beach is also known as Boyds Beach, and the community behind it is Kiama Downs. A road runs the length of the beach. The northern half is given over to sand dunes, parks and the Kiama Downs Surf Life Saving Club, founded in 1982. Houses back the beach's southern half. The beach receives waves averaging 1–1.5 metres (3 ft 3 in – 4 ft 11 in), which result in a single bar usually cut by six, including permanent rips against each headland, the northern being the stronger. Rocks also occur in the surf toward the southern end.

It is a popular tourist spot and the beach is patrolled. Facilities include wheelchair accessible toilets, limited undercover and shaded picnic areas, and bicycle racks. Pets, glass or bottles, firearms, and jet skis are not permitted.

Surfing competitions are held at Jones Beach between February and October, and a one-on-one competition held in November annually.
