= Jones Beach =

Jones Beach may refer to:

== Australia ==
- Jones Beach (New South Wales), located in the Illawarra / South Coast regions of New South Wales

== United States ==
- Jones Beach Island, a barrier island off the coast of Long Island, New York:
  - Jones Beach State Park, a state park in Nassau County, New York located on Jones Beach Island
    - Jones Beach Theater, an outdoor amphitheater located at Jones Beach State Park
- Jones Beach, near Clatskanie, Oregon
- Jones Beach, Ontario, a village on the shore of Lake Ontario
- Jones Beach Camp in Sinkyone Wilderness State Park, in California

== See also ==
- Major Thomas Jones
