= Willow Vale, New South Wales =

Willow Vale, New South Wales may refer to:

- Willow Vale, New South Wales (Kiama), Australia
- Willow Vale, New South Wales (Wingecarribee), Australia
