= Rose Valley, New South Wales (Kiama) =

Rose Valley Wollongong, New South Wales
- Coordinates: 34°43′18.35″S 150°49′46.79″E
- Population: 87 (2021 census)
- Postcode(s): 2534
- Elevation: 26 m (85 ft)
- Location: 10 km (6 mi) SSW of Kiama; 30 km (19 mi) ENE of Nowra; 137 km (85 mi) S of Sydney
- LGA(s): Municipality of Kiama
- County: Camden
- Parish: Broughton
- State electorate(s): Kiama
- Federal division(s): Gilmore
Suburbs around Rose Valley:
| Saddleback Mountain | Saddleback Mountain | Kiama Heights |
| Foxground | Rose Valley | Gerringong |
| Willow Vale | Gerringong | Gerringong |

Rose Valley is a locality in the Municipality of Kiama, in the Illawarra region of New South Wales, Australia. It lies west of the Princes Highway to the west of Gerringong about 130 km south of Sydney. At the 2021 census, it had a population of 87. It had a public school from 1868 to 1877 and 1884 to 1904.
