= No. 18 Radar Station RAAF =

No. 18 Radar Station RAAF was a Royal Australian Air Force (RAAF) radar station formed at Richmond, New South Wales, Australia on 1 April 1942.

The radar was a truck mounted AW radar built by New South Wales Government Railways. The radar moved to Saddle Back Mountain, near Kiama, New South Wales and became operational on 20 April 1942.

On the 20 July 1942, eight Women's Auxiliary Australian Air Force (WAAAF) operators arrived and became the first RAAF radar unit to employ WAAAF operators. The radar station at Kiama was built to monitor enemy airborne threats during World War II. The truck mounted AW radar was eventually replaced by a Mk V COL radar unit.

During the night of 19 February 1943, WAAAF operator Jo Lehmann plotted Susumi Ito's plane as it made a reconnaissance of the southern coast of New South Wales. The report at the time was ignored by Fighter Sector HQ.

No. 18 Radar Station RAAF was disbanded on 4 March 1946.

== Commanding officers ==
- W.W. Weston (FlgOff) - 1 April 1942
- D.D. Kennedy (PltOff) - 10 May 1942
- C.T. Grout-Smith (PltOff) - 23 May 1942
- N.H. King (PltOff) - 2 October 1942
- E.L. Walther (PltOff) - 8 July 1943
- W.T.S. Middleton (PltOff) - 15 October 1943
- C.C. Zahara (PltOff) - 7 December 1943
- W.B. Ross (PltOff) - 17 March 1944
- R.H. Robinson (FlgOff) - 27 March 1943
- E.L. Walther (FlgOff) - 30 November 1944
