= Curramore, New South Wales =

Curramore New South Wales
- Coordinates: 34°37′57″S 150°45′32″E
- Population: 220 (2021 census)
- Postcode(s): 2533
- LGA(s): Municipality of Kiama
- Region: Illawarra
- County: Camden
- Parish: Jamberoo
- State electorate(s): Kiama
- Federal division(s): Gilmore

Curramore is a rural locality north of Jamberoo, New South Wales in the Municipality of Kiama. At the 2021 census, it had a population of 220.
