= Toolijooa =

- Town
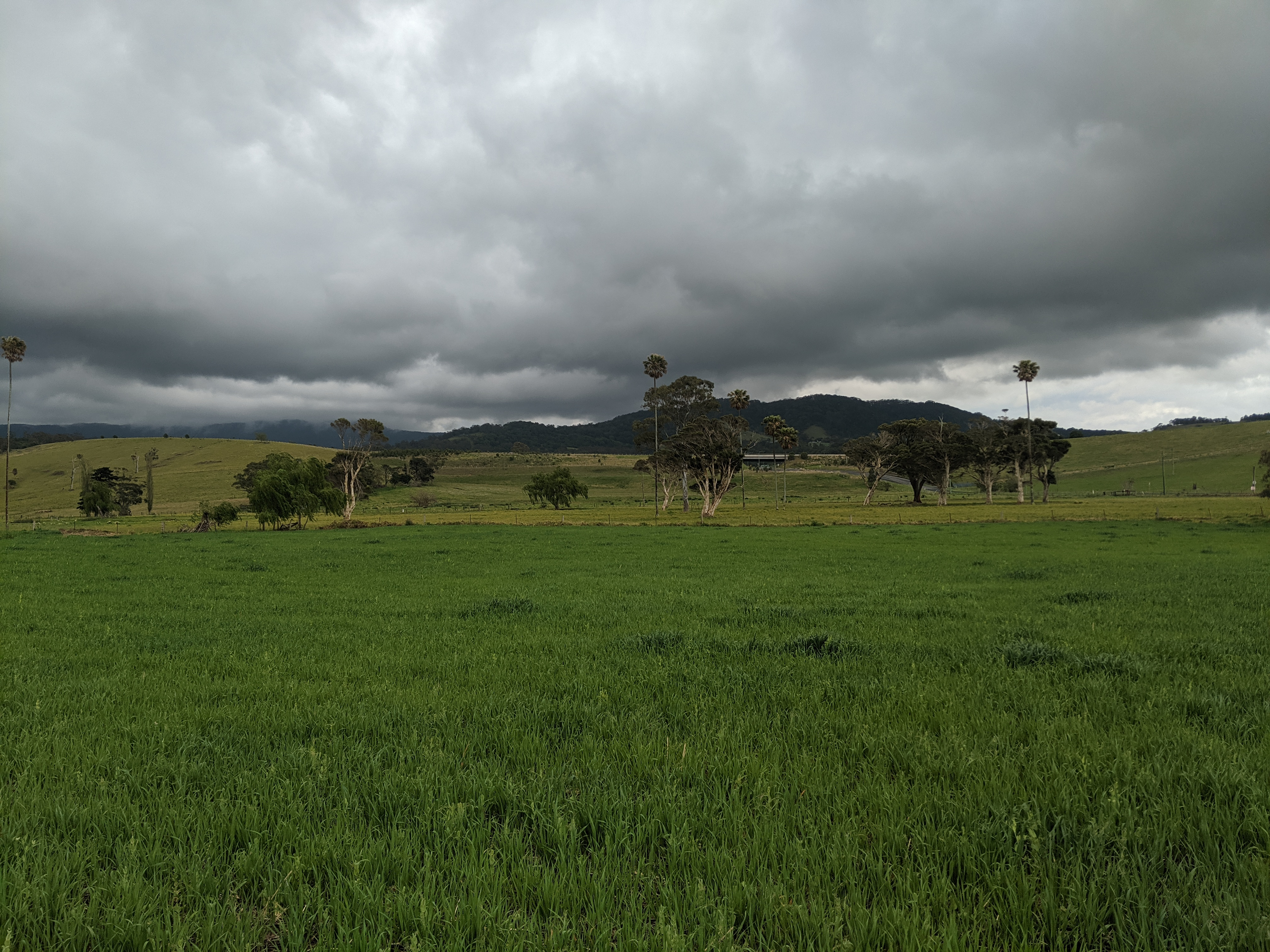

- Coordinates: 34°45′55″S 150°47′05″E
- Country: Australia
- State: New South Wales
- LGA: Municipality of Kiama
- Location: 17 km (11 mi) SSW of Kiama; 28 km (17 mi) ENE of Nowra; 137 km (85 mi) S of Sydney

Government
  - State electorate: Kiama
  - Federal division: Gilmore
- Elevation: 26 m (85 ft)

Population
  - Total: 103 (2021 census)
- Postcode: 2534
Localities around Toolijooa
Foxground	Willow Vale	Gerringong
Broughton Village	Toolijooa	Gerroa
Berry	Gerroa	Gerroa

Toolijooa is a small village in the Municipality of Kiama, Illawarra, New South Wales, Australia.

== Transport ==
It lies on the South Coast railway line, and once had a railway station.

== Duplication ==
Duplication of the tracks through Toolijooa is proposed to increase capacity for freight trains and to allow passenger services to be improved from hourly to half-hourly. As of August 2026, this project has not commenced construction.

== Town ==
Toolijooa is one of the last villages in the Illawarra. It is located next to Gerroa and has many farms.
