= Kiama Downs =

- Suburb
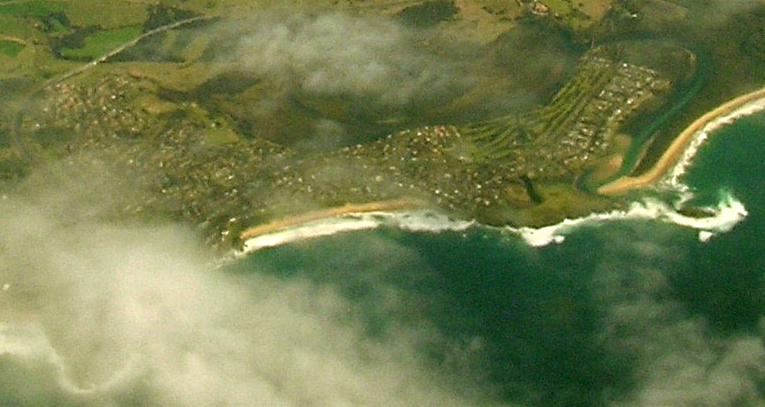
- Aerial view: Kiama Downs to the left and centre, and Minnamurra to the right.

- Interactive map of Kiama Downs
- Coordinates: 34°38.5′S 150°51.0′E
- Country: Australia
- State: New South Wales
- City: Kiama
- LGA: Municipality of Kiama
- Location: 118 km (73 mi) from Sydney; 36 km (22 mi) from Wollongong; 4 km (2.5 mi) from Kiama

Government
  - State electorate: Kiama
  - Federal division: Gilmore
- Elevation: 7 m (23 ft)

Population
  - Total: 5,087 (2021 census)
- Postcode: 2533
- County: Camden
- Parish: Kiama
Suburbs around Kiama Downs
| Dunmore | Minnamurra |
| Jamberoo | Kiama Downs | Tasman Sea |
| Kiama | Bombo |

Kiama Downs is a suburb of the town Kiama in the Illawarra region south of Sydney, Australia. Renowned for its picturesque beaches and seaside views, it is about 4 km (2 mi) north of Kiama and is bordered by the Minnamurra River to the northwest and Jones Beach to the east.

There is a bakery, cafe, pharmacy, supermarket, take-away store, and general practice on Johnson Street.

The western part of the suburb, west of Riverside Drive, was previously known as Gainsborough Estate when it was developed for housing in the 1980s.

Kiama Downs does not have a school or a railway station. The nearest public primary school is Minnamurra Public School and the nearest public high school is Kiama High School. The nearest railway stations are Minnamurra and Bombo.

The biggest beach is Jones Beach, about one kilometre long, between Minnamurra Point and a headland 30 metres high, of the southern Cathedral Rocks

Australian skateboarder Kieran Woolley is from Kiama Downs.
