= Gerringong =

- Town
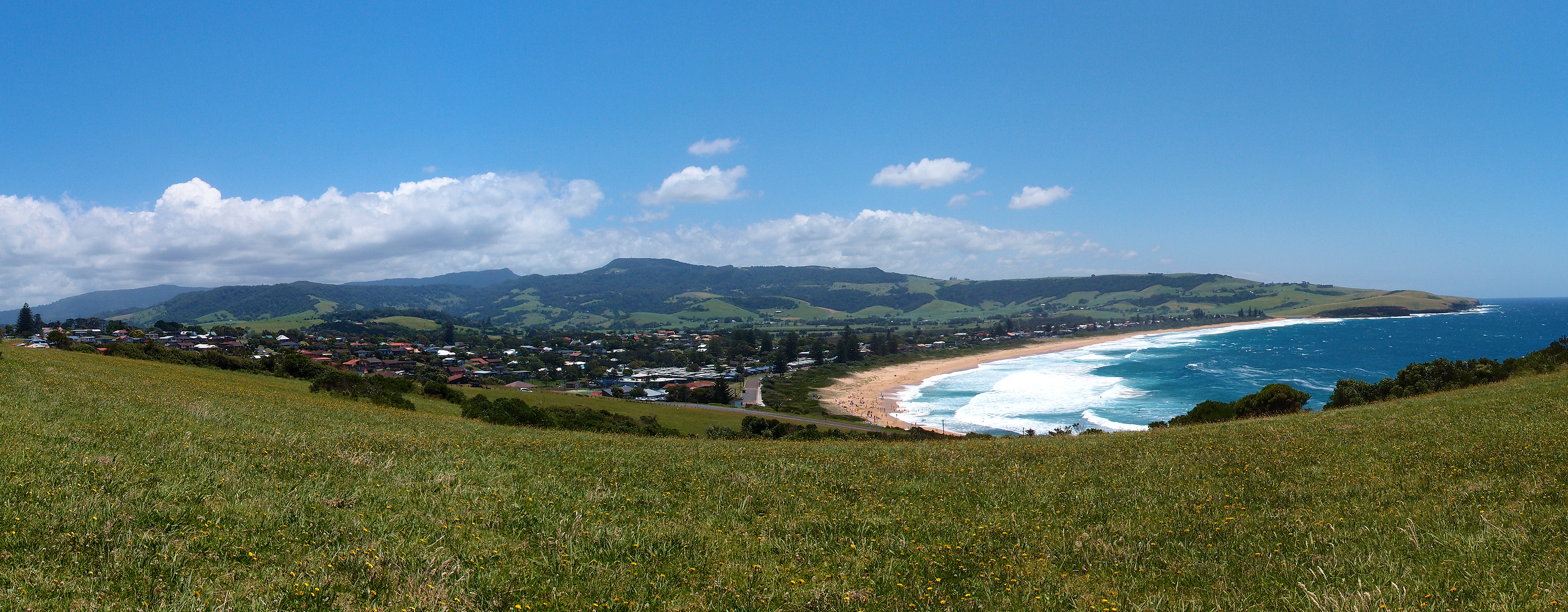
- A view of the town from the south

- Coordinates: 34°45′S 150°50′E
- Country: Australia
- State: New South Wales
- LGA: Municipality of Kiama
- Location: 130 km (81 mi) from Sydney; 12 km (7.5 mi) from Kiama; 33 km (21 mi) from Nowra
- Established: 1854

Government
  - State electorate: Kiama
  - Federal division: Gilmore
- Elevation: 44 m (144 ft)

Population
  - Total: 4,165 (2021 census)
- Postcode: 2534
- County: Camden
- Parish: Broughton
Localities around Gerringong
Rose Valley	Kiama Heights	Werri Beach
Willow Vale	Gerringong	Tasman Sea
Toolijooa	Gerroa

Gerringong (/dʒɛrɪŋɡɒŋ/) is a town in the Illawarra region of New South Wales, Australia, located south of Kiama and north of Nowra. It is within the Municipality of Kiama. At the 2021 census, Gerringong had a population of 4,165.

== History ==
Aboriginal people of the Dharawal language group are the original inhabitants and traditional custodians of the area now known as Gerringong and its surroundings.It is often theorised that the name derives from an Aboriginal word meaning "fearful place".

The first Europeans to pass through the district on land were probably survivors of the wreck of the Sydney Cove who trekked more than 700 km along the coast, during 1797. George Bass explored the nearby coast, later in 1797, during his voyage that revealed the existence of the Shoalhaven River to the colonial settlers.

The first Europeans working in the area were red cedar cutters, who were first recorded as having visited and logged in the area in 1814. As in much of coastal New South Wales, the cleared land was used for dairy farming and cedar cutting died out, as the cedar trees disappeared. Dairy farming became the predominant primary industry and remains so to this day. Gerringong had a small boat harbour used for the export of cedar and dairy produce.

The Surveyor-General John Oxley and Assistant Surveyor-General James Meehan led two separate but concurrent expeditions passing through the Gerringong area in late 1819. Oxley proceeded down the coast by sea to the Shoalhaven. Meehan went overland, starting from the Minnamurra River and meeting Oxley at the Shoalhaven. Oxley's report of good soil in the area increased interest in agricultural settlement.

In 1824, Governor Brisbane reserved 600 acres (2.4 km^{2}) for the present Gerringong township. In 1827, Michael Hindmarsh and his family were granted 640 acres (2.6 km^{2}) and became the first settler in the Gerringong area. In 1829, Gerringong was incorporated into the postal system.

Aboriginal people in the area of Gerringong continued to state their ownership of it—including Hindmarsh's grant—in the 1840s. By then, the settlers' clearing of the sub-tropical rainforest was transforming the landscape completely—to lush pastures suited to dairy cattle—and depriving the original inhabitants of the land, environment and land-based food sources upon which they had depended for thousands of years. Effectively barred from private land, they were confined to unalienated 'government' land.

Alne Bank homestead was built in 1851 for the Hindmarsh family, who still live there today and occasionally open it for inspection.

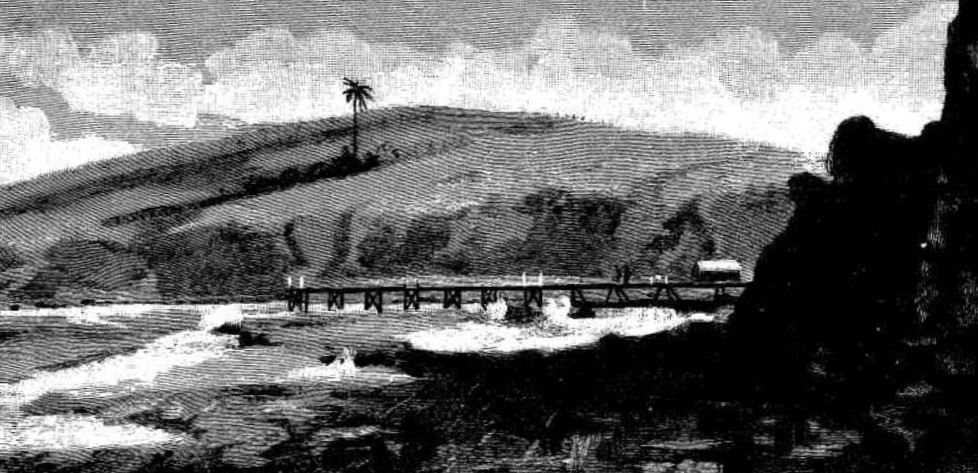
Gerringong Jetty (unknown engraver, The Sydney Mail and New South Wales Advertiser Sat 22 Apr 1893 Page 819 ) Its former site is known as Boat Harbour.

In 1854, a town plan for Gerringong was approved and the Governor proclaimed it a village. In 1872, the business area, Church of England church and some houses were destroyed by a bush fire.

In the late 1860s and 1870s, locals advocated the erection of a jetty at the Boatharbour. In 1880 a 200-foot-long jetty was completed but it was too short to allow coastal ships to berth. One ship that did call there was Dairy Maid, a small wooden-hulled steamer built in the Rock Davis shipyard. The jetty was extended, in the mid-1880s, first by 200-feet and subsequently another 100 feet. The 500-foot-long jetty was extensively damaged in fierce storms in 1891. It was rebuilt but, during that work, was damaged again by stormy weather in 1892, necessitating more repairs. A new crane was installed in 1893. The jetty was probably used to land materials for railway construction.

In 1893, the South Coast railway line was extended to Gerringong, leading to the end of shipping from the town. The disused jetty was given to the local council, for use as bridge material, around 1901. The last standing remnants of the jetty were washed away in 1904.

By 1897, the dispossession was complete; local Aborigines had "dwindled to a handful" living in a camp just south-west of Gerringong, at Crooked River and another camp at 'Ooirie Creek' (now Ooarie Creek) near Omega, whose inhabitants were later relocated. The lives of the surviving Aborigines were, for many years, controlled by the Aborigines Protection Board, and subject to the disdain of many—if not all—white inhabitants.

Telephone services were extended to Gerringong by June 1915 and electricity was connected in 1928.

In 1954, Gerringong Municipal District amalgamated with Kiama Municipal Council. The town water supply was connected in 1971, signalling an end to tanks attached to each house. Land along the coastal fringe tends to receive higher rainfall than the interior water catchment areas, which are often in rainshadow. In 2002, the town sewerage system was connected.

== Modern Gerringong ==
At the 2021 census, Gerringong and the surrounding area had a population of 4,165. There is still an Aboriginal presence in Gerringong. In 2021, 2.8% of the population identified as indigenous.

The main local industries are agriculture (including dairying and vineyards), tourism and retail trade. Others enjoy the seaside lifestyle but commute to work in Wollongong or Nowra and even Sydney.

The town has a modern primary school, a town hall (built 1948), a large retirement village and a tourist industry. Especially in the summer months, when visitors (mostly from Sydney and Canberra) attend the beaches for swimming, surfing, fishing and the restaurants and cafés. There are two vineyards.

The Gerringong and District Historical Society runs the Heritage Museum, containing scale models of buildings, a photographic record of motor racing on Seven Mile Beach in the 1920s, and a display on the local dairying industry.

== Transport ==
Gerringong railway station is served by Sydney Trains Intercity South Coast Line. Services are provided by diesel trains, which connect with electric trains to Sydney at Kiama. Local bus companies connect Gerringong to Kiama and Nowra on a daily basis, and interstate buses connect it with Sydney and Melbourne and all stops in between.

In 2012, a major Princes Highway upgrade commenced in Gerringong. The upgrade provides 7.5 kilometres of upgraded highway and includes two new interchanges with access to Gerringong and Gerroa. This major infrastructure project includes a new overpass over the Omega rail level crossing, major highway widening, additional exits, and safer on and off ramps. The $329 million upgrade was officially opened on 20 August 2015.

== Geography ==
Historical population
Year	Pop.	±%
1921	792	—
1933	855	+8.0%
1947	881	+3.0%
1954	1,058	+20.1%
1961		—
1966	805	—
1971	895	+11.2%
1976	1,240	+38.5%
1981	1,775	+43.1%
1986	2,326	+31.0%
1991	2,478	+6.5%
1996	2,891	+16.7%
2001	3,488	+20.7%
2006	3,588	+2.9%
2011	3,998	+11.4%
2016	4,404	+10.2%
2021	4,565	+3.7%
Source: Australian Bureau of Statistics data.

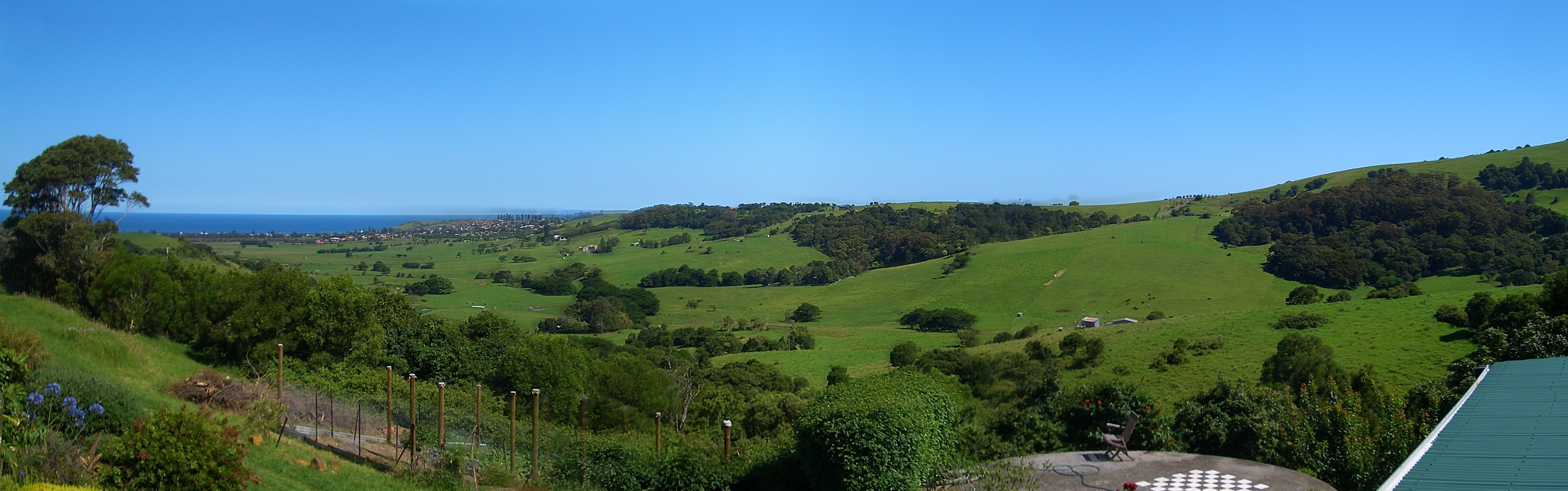
View of Rose Valley and (on the horizon) Gerringong

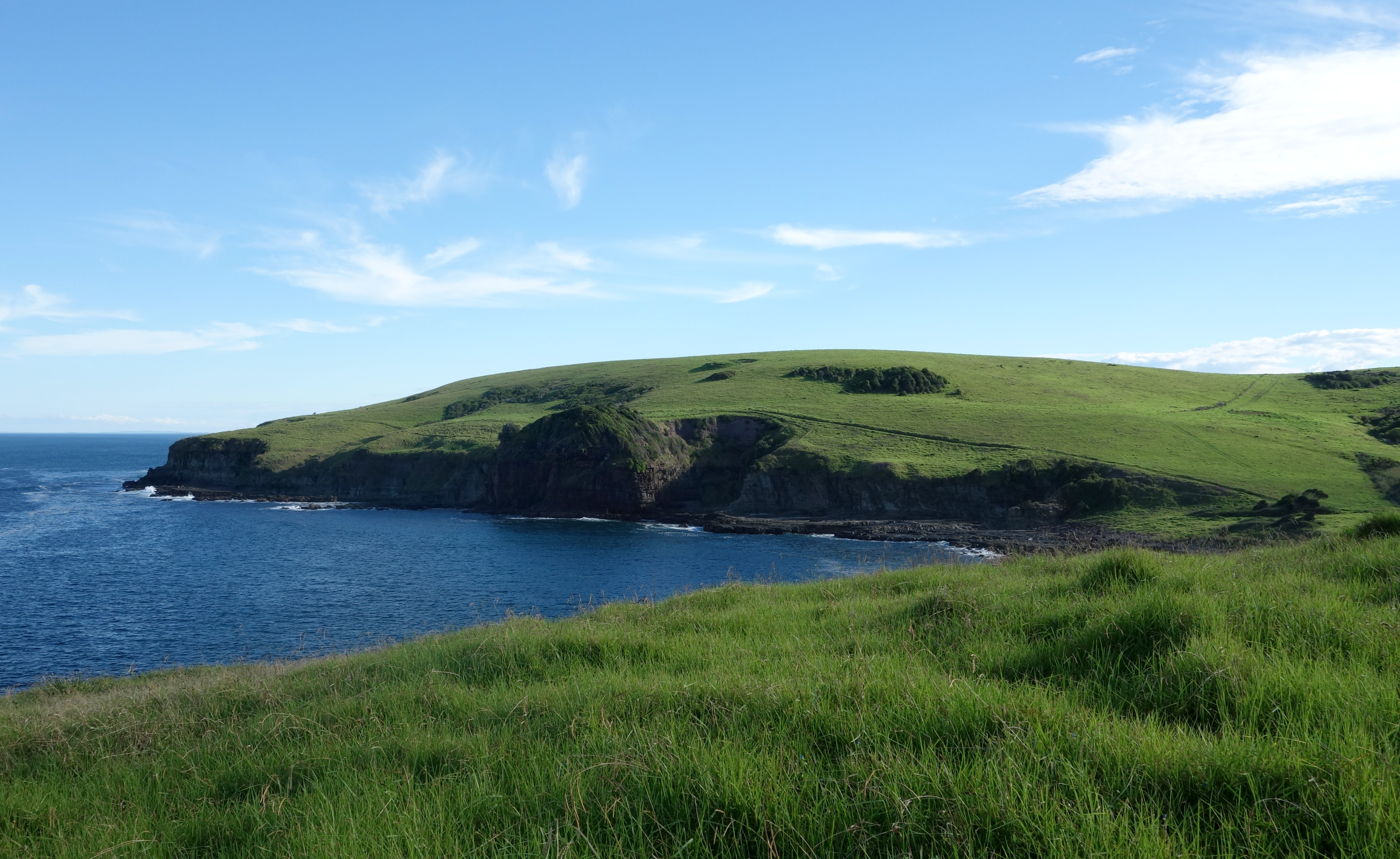
A coastal headland north of the town. The Kiama Coast Walk can be seen faintly along the hill.

The boundaries of the Gerringong District range from Mount Pleasant and Omega in the north, to Rose Valley, Willow Vale and Foxground in the west, and to Broughton Village, Toolijooa, Harley Hill, Gerroa and Seven Mile Beach in the south. In the centre of the area lies the town of Gerringong itself, and the nearby area of Werri Beach.

The Kiama and Gerringong area is marketed as "Where the Mountains Meet the Sea" by Kiama Council. A spur of Saddleback Mountain reaches down to Mt Pleasant to the north of Gerringong township, ending the Illawarra escarpment, which starts north of Wollongong. The area is famous for its coastline, which includes sea cliffs, beaches surrounded by rolling hills and countryside that stays green year-round.

The spur of Saddlback Mountain that separates Gerringong from Kiama was very significant in the town's history. The steep road over the spur made using the port of Kiama difficult. Gerringong would need its own small port, until the railway from Kiama opened in 1893 after tunnels were cut through the basalt rock of the spur.

The Princes Highway bypasses Gerringong township on its western edge, with two exits, one at Fern St and an underpass at Belinda Street, 2 km further south. Gerringong and Werri Beach were previously two separate localities, but have now grown together without any definitive boundary.

Werri Lagoon, which sometimes empties to the sea at the northern end of Werri Beach, used to naturally exit near the Gerringong Surf Club at the south end, until human intervention occurred in the 1960s. Bridges Road used to be access to a bridge which provided access to Werri Beach.

Werri Lagoon is now part of the Kiama Coast Walk, which stretches from Loves Bay, north of Kiama, to Werri Lagoon. The walking track extends for six kilometres and took eleven years to prepare and construct. It opened in October 2009.

Gerringong's Boatharbour—its traditional spelling—was used extensively for shipping timber and dairy produce in the 19th century. The Boatharbour provides little shelter from a black nor'easter and relatively little from the heavy seas associated with an east coast low. There is a boat ramp there and it is the location of Gerringong's ocean swimming pool. It is now generally referred to as Boat Harbour.

Gerringong's geology is basically basalt, emplaced in the Permian period.

=== Climate ===
Gerringong is the most northerly coastal town that is entirely within an oceanic climate (Köppen: Cfb), although it is at a dominated latitude of subtropical climates along the coast the low average record temperatures are more similar to the second category. The city has warm summers and mild winters. Rainfall is spread relatively evenly throughout the year with the wettest months being in autumn and the driest in spring.

Climate data for Kiama
Month	Jan	Feb	Mar	Apr	May	Jun	Jul	Aug	Sep	Oct	Nov	Dec	Year
Mean daily maximum °C (°F)	25.2 (77.4)	25.2 (77.4)	24.3 (75.7)	22.3 (72.1)	20.1 (68.2)	17.7 (63.9)	16.9 (62.4)	18.2 (64.8)	20.0 (68.0)	21.8 (71.2)	22.4 (72.3)	24.3 (75.7)	21.5 (70.7)
Mean daily minimum °C (°F)	17.5 (63.5)	17.8 (64.0)	16.5 (61.7)	13.8 (56.8)	11.9 (53.4)	9.4 (48.9)	8.5 (47.3)	8.9 (48.0)	10.7 (51.3)	12.4 (54.3)	14.0 (57.2)	16.3 (61.3)	13.1 (55.6)
Average precipitation mm (inches)	108.9 (4.29)	120.8 (4.76)	141.0 (5.55)	129.7 (5.11)	120.3 (4.74)	123.1 (4.85)	88.6 (3.49)	81.4 (3.20)	73.0 (2.87)	86.3 (3.40)	88.5 (3.48)	92.4 (3.64)	1,252.8 (49.32)
Source: BOM

== Politics ==
Gerringong is part of the Municipality of Kiama. Local residents are represented by the Member of NSW Parliament for Kiama, currently Katelin McInerney. The area is represented by the Federal Member for Gilmore, currently Fiona Phillips.

== Notable people ==
- Mick Cronin, former rugby league player, owner of local pub
- Sally Fitzgibbons, pro surfer
- Jackson Ford, rugby league player, currently playing for New Zealand Warriors
- Ben Fryer, lead guitarist from Pacific Avenue
- Reuben Garrick, rugby league player, currently playing for Manly Warringah Sea Eagles
- Lloyd Rees, artist; the area was the subject of many of his landscape works from the 1930s to the 1980s.
- Paul Quinn, former rugby league player
- Ron Quinn, former rugby league player
- Ashton Sims, former rugby league player, played for the Gerringong Lions as a junior, now runs Group 7 Rugby League
- Korbin Sims, former rugby league player, played for the Gerringong Lions as a junior
- Ruan Sims, former Australian Jillaroos representative rugby league player
- Tariq Sims, rugby league player, played for the Gerringong Lions as a junior
- Grace Stewart, Australian field hockey representative
- Rod Wishart, former rugby league player
- Tyran Wishart, rugby league player, currently playing for Melbourne Storm
- The Terrys, indie folk band
- Pacific Avenue, alternative rock band
