= Seven Mile Beach (New South Wales) =

Beach in New South Wales, Australia

- Beach
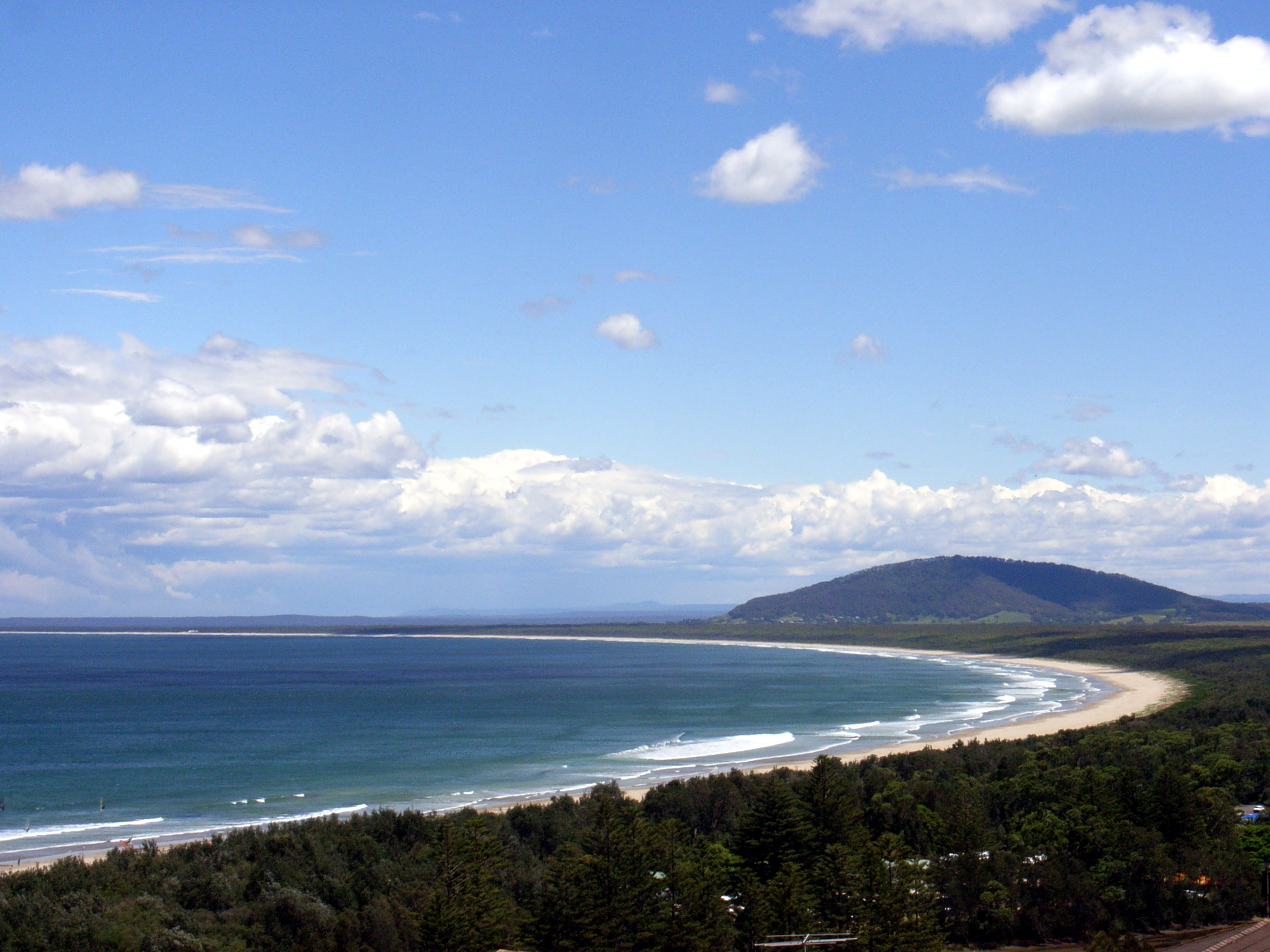
- View of Seven Mile Beach, looking south from Gerroa

- Location within New South Wales
- Coordinates: 34.7725°S 150.8133°E
- Location: Gerroa and Shoalhaven Heads, New South Wales, Australia

Dimensions
  - Length: 12.5 km (7.8 mi)
- Patrolled by: Shoalhaven Heads Surf Life Saving Club
- Hazard rating: 7/10 (highly hazardous)

Seven Mile Beach is a long beach with significant historical importance, located just south of Gerringong in the Shoalhaven area of New South Wales, Australia.

== History ==
In 1933, Seven Mile Beach was used by Sir Charles Kingsford Smith as the runway for the first commercial flight between Australia and New Zealand.

== Flora ==
The area contains a unique littoral rainforest with several rainforest plants at their southernmost limit of distribution, as well as a beach/dune/wetland ecosystem and has been used for studying sand dunes and their vegetation. Surrounding the beach are spinifex, coast wattle, tea-tree, coast banksia, she-oaks, saw banksia, southern mahogany or bangalay, and burrawangs. It also features a small river and a lake.

== Fauna ==
Its bird population includes honeyeaters, currawongs, crimson rosellas, thornbills, kookaburras, ravens, grey fantails, eastern whipbirds and white-throated treecreepers, and even white-breasted sea eagles.

== Gallery ==
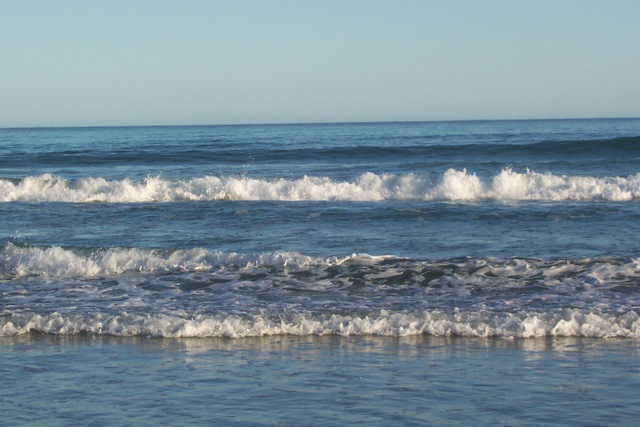
Seven Mile Beach at sunset

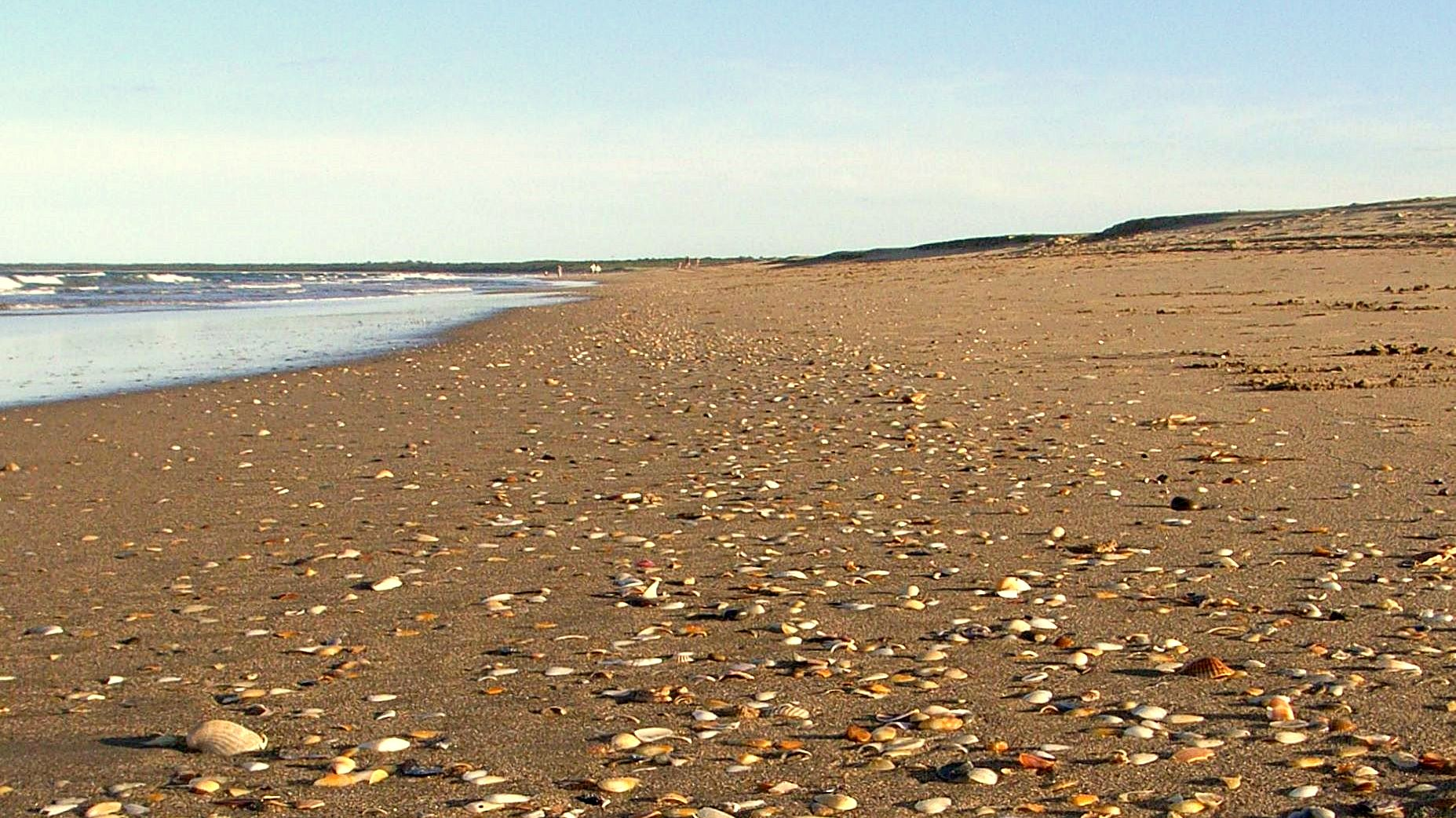
Sand and shells on Seven Mile Beach

== See also ==
- Seven Mile Beach National Park
