= Jerrara =

Jerrara Wollongong, New South Wales
- Coordinates: 34°40′10″S 150°49′24″E
- Population: 132 (2021 census)
- Postcode(s): 2533
- LGA(s): Municipality of Kiama
- State electorate(s): Kiama
- Federal division(s): Gilmore

Jerrara is a locality in the Municipality of Kiama, in the Illawarra region of New South Wales, Australia.
