= Minnamurra =

- Suburb
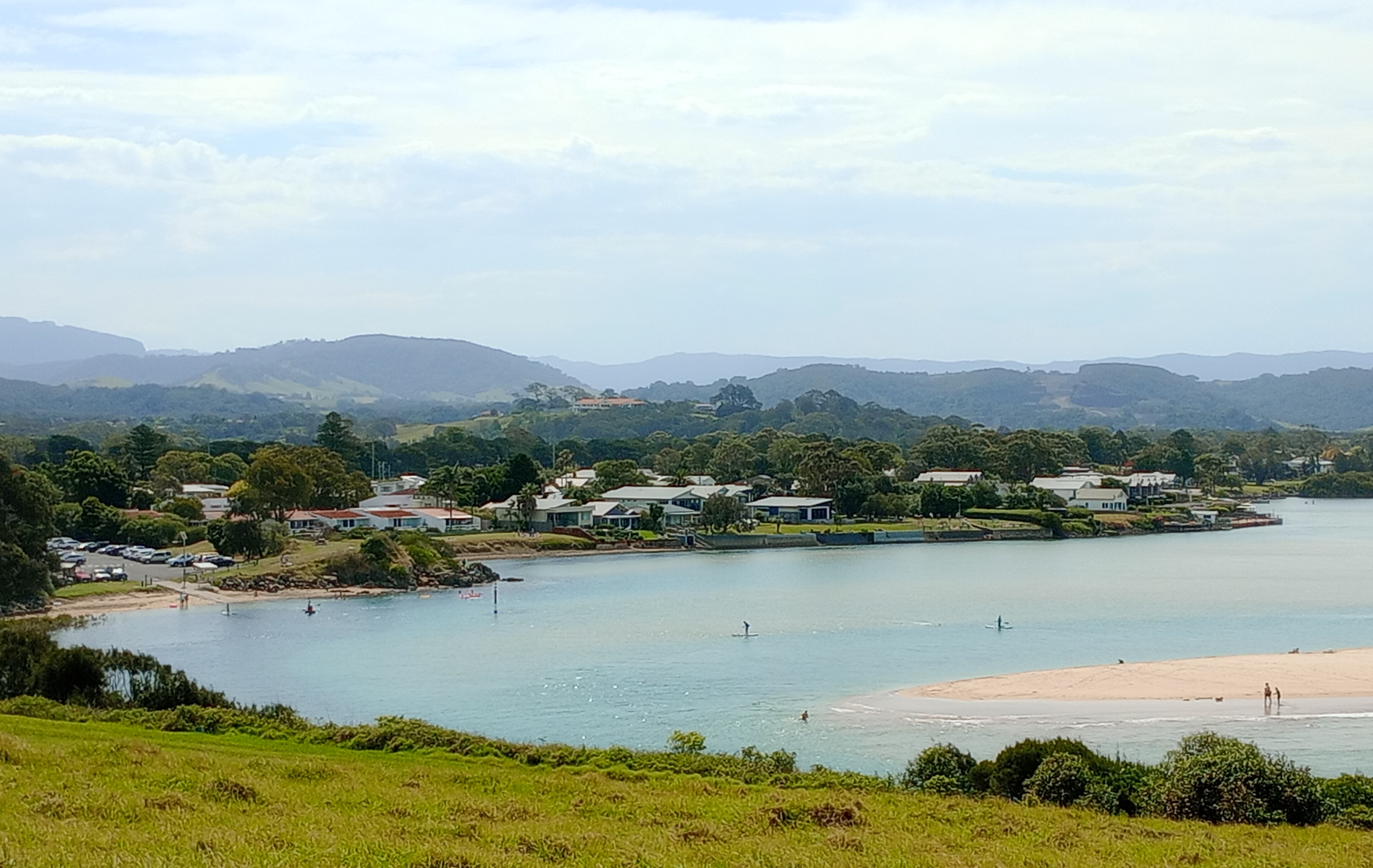
- The village in November 2024

- Interactive map of Minnamurra
- Coordinates: 34°37′30″S 150°51′07″E
- Country: Australia
- State: New South Wales
- City: Kiama
- LGA: Municipality of Kiama
- Location: 117 km (73 mi) SSW of Sydney; 35 km (22 mi) S of Wollongong; 6 km (3.7 mi) N of Kiama

Government
  - State electorate: Kiama
  - Federal division: Gilmore
- Elevation: 7 m (23 ft)

Population
  - Total: 804 (2021 census)
- Postcode: 2533
- County: Camden
- Parish: Kiama
Suburbs around Minnamurra
	Shell Cove
Dunmore	Minnamurra
	Kiama Downs

Minnamurra is a village in the Illawarra region of New South Wales, Australia, in the Municipality of Kiama. It has a station (opened 1891) on the Sydney Trains South Coast Line. The Minnamurra River flows into the ocean at Minnamurra. There is a sandy beach and a sand spit at the river mouth.

The name Minnamurra means "plenty of fish" in the local Aboriginal dialect. Aboriginal people of the Dharawal language group are the original inhabitants and traditional custodians of the area now known as Minnamurra and its surroundings.

Within a two-hour drive south of Sydney, the Minnamurra Rainforest Centre is located just 15 km west of Kiama on the NSW South Coast (Tourist Drive '9'). The centre offers visitors an opportunity to experience a rare rainforest remnant which is representative of the once extensive rainforests of the Illawarra region.

The sandstone canyon in which the centre is located enables visitors to experience the various types of rainforest and examine the diversity of ferns species. Visitors can see first hand the fauna of the area such as lyrebirds, Australian water dragons and a host of bird species which make Minnamurra and Australia their home.

The centre also provides a café and a barbecue/picnic area. The visitor centre has a retail shop where visitors can select from a wide range of Australian made products, environmental publications, and souvenirs as a reminder of their visit to Minnamurra Rainforest.

Minnamurra Public School is the local school for the Minnamurra, Kiama Downs and Gainsborough area. Minnamurra Rainforest is a forest with much wildlife and many plants. This rainforest has produced over the years and is becoming a tourist attraction. It is located 15 km west of Kiama.
