= Minnamurra River =

River in New South Wales, Australia

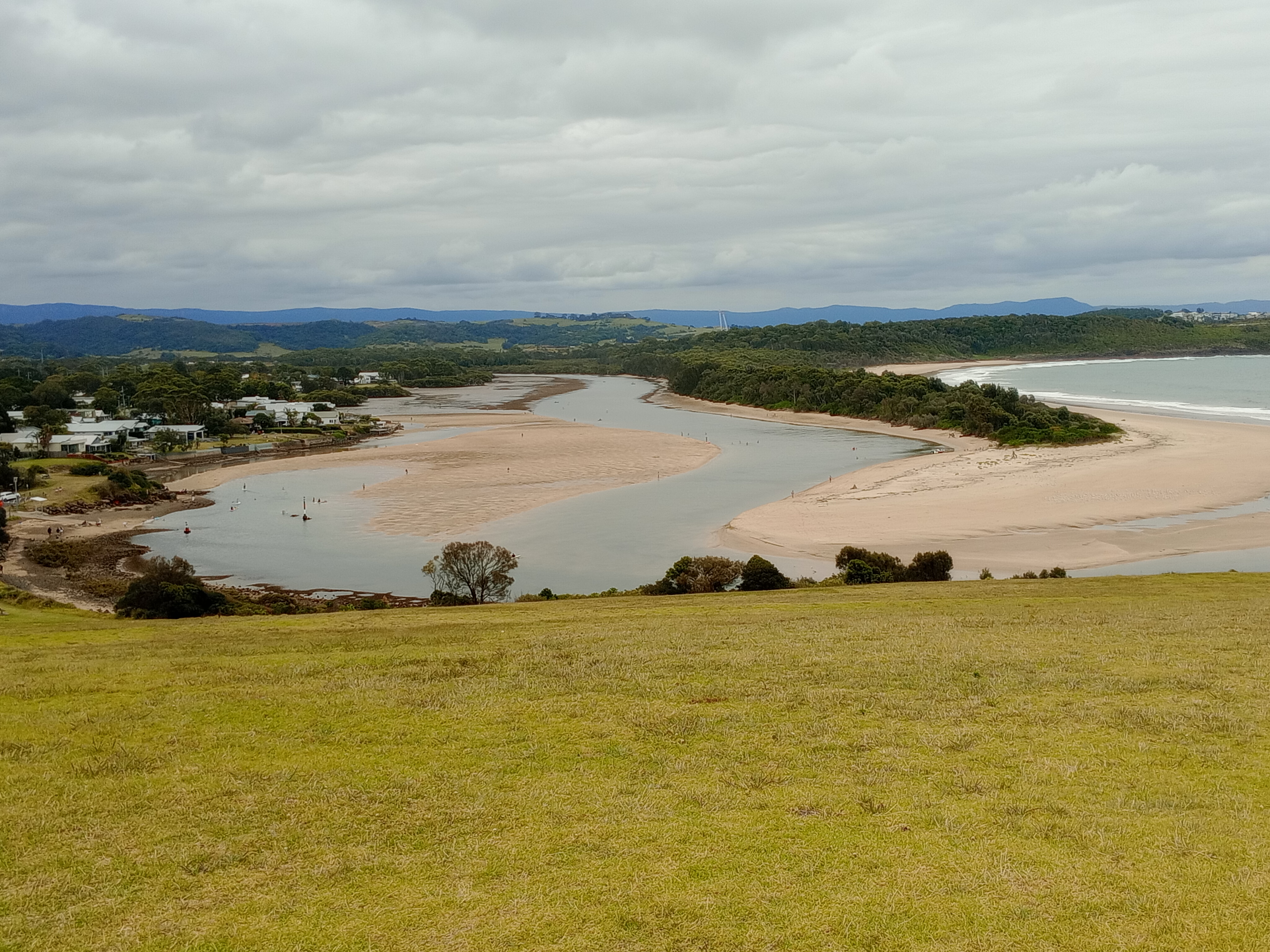
- The mouth of Minnamurra River, January 2026.

- Location of river mouth in New South Wales
- Etymology: Aboriginal: Meme Mora, meaning "river of many fish".

Location
- Country: Australia
- State: New South Wales
- Region: Sydney Basin (IBRA), Illawarra
- LGAs: Shellharbour, Kiama

Physical characteristics
- Source: Illawarra escarpment
  - location: west of Jamberoo
- Mouth: Tasman Sea, South Pacific Ocean
  - location: Minnamurra Point, Minnamurra
- Length: 23 km (14 mi)
- Basin size: 117 km^{2} (45 sq mi)

Basin features
- National park: Budderoo

The Minnamurra River, an open mature wave dominated barrier estuary, is located in the Illawarra region of New South Wales, Australia. The village of Minnamurra is near the mouth of the river, where it flows into the Pacific Ocean.

== Location and features ==
Minnamurra River rises within the Budderoo National Park on the eastern slopes of the Illawarra escarpment, west of the village of Jamberoo and north of Missingham Pass, and flows generally east, descending the 100 metres (330 ft) Minamurra Falls. The river drains into the Jamberoo Valley surrounded by Stockyard Mountain to the north, Jamberoo Mountain to the west and Noorinan and Saddleback Mountain to the south. The mouth of the river lies immediately north of the Kiama suburb of Minnamurra at Minnamurra Point. The entrance is characterised by a small island just offshore from the mouth. The river descends 306 metres (1,004 ft) over its 23 kilometres (14 mi) course.

The Princes Highway crosses the Minnamurra River north of the suburb of Minnamurra.

The name Minnamurra is derived from the Aboriginal word of Meme Mora, meaning "river of many fish".

In 1893, four adults and three children were drowned whilst rowing a small boat near the mouth of the Minnamurra River. The boat succumbed to heavy surf conditions.

== See also ==
- List of rivers of Australia § New South Wales
- List of rivers of New South Wales (L–Z)
- Rivers of New South Wales
