= Gerroa =

- Town
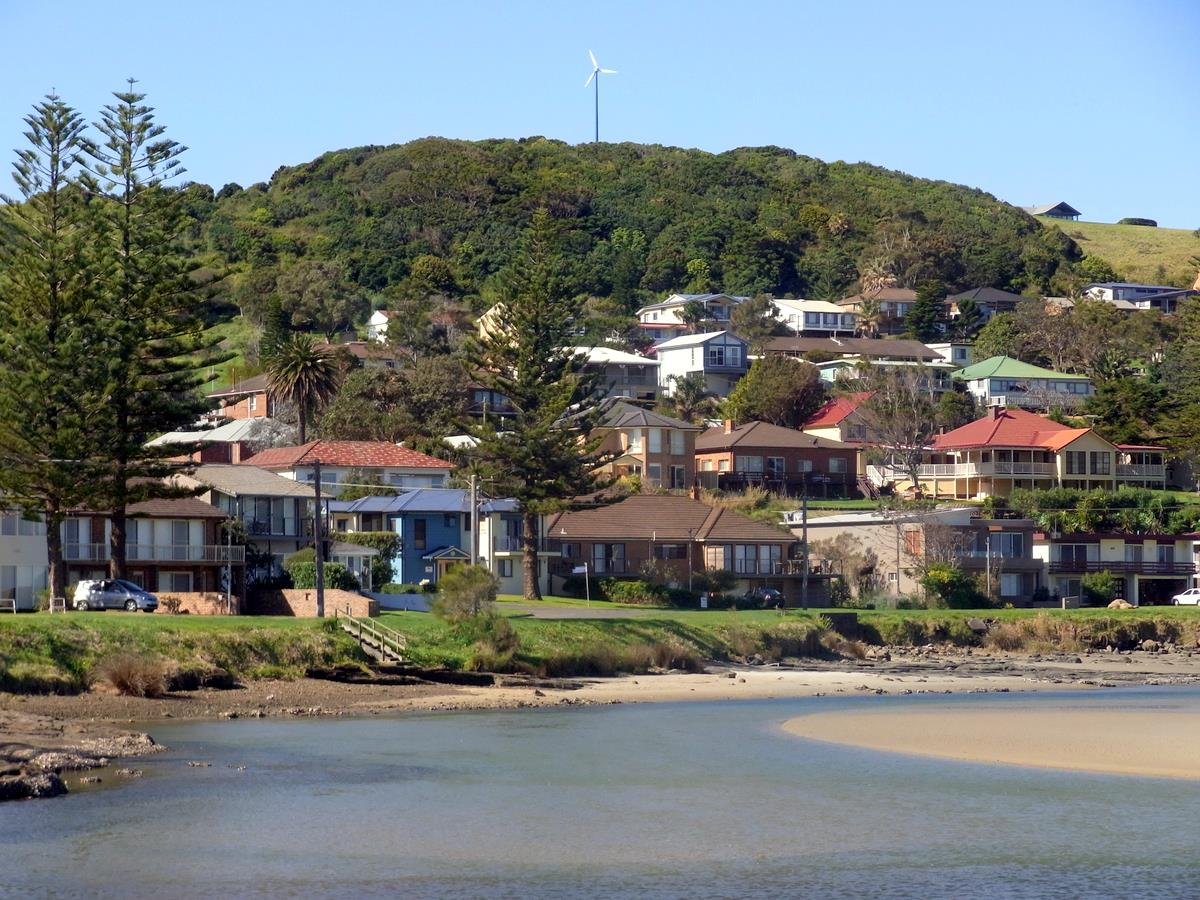
- Gerroa, rainforest hill and the Crooked River

- Coordinates: 34°46.194′S 150°48.788′E
- Country: Australia
- State: New South Wales
- LGA: Municipality of Kiama
- Location: 133 km (83 mi) from Sydney; 3 km (1.9 mi) from Gerringong; 30 km (19 mi) from Nowra

Government
  - State electorate: Kiama
  - Federal division: Gilmore
- Elevation: 15 m (49 ft)

Population
  - Total: 571 (2021 census)
- Postcode: 2534
- County: Camden
- Parish: Broughton
Localities around Gerroa
| Toolijooa | Gerringong |
| Berry | Gerroa | Tasman Sea |
| Berry |

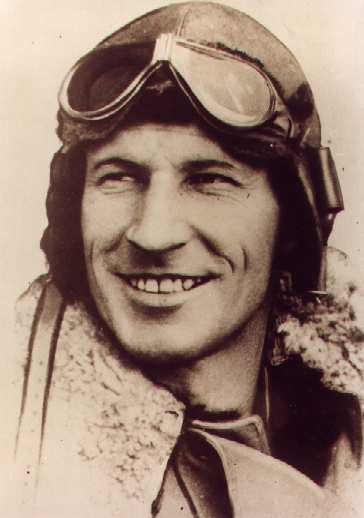
Sir Charles Kingsford Smith

Gerroa is a coastal town in the Municipality of Kiama, in the Illawarra region of New South Wales, Australia 133 kilometres south of Sydney. It is considered to be the southernmost town in the Illawarra region. Nearby towns are Gerringong, Kiama and Berry.

Situated at the northern end of Seven Mile Beach and the head of Crooked River, the original village was once a retreat for various religious orders. Today it is a popular holiday town, and residence for retirees. Many houses have impressive views of the beach and Mount Coolangatta. At the 2021 census, the population was 571, although the population swells, particularly at Easter and the Christmas−New Year break. Many holiday makers stay at the caravan park, by the Crooked River.

== Outdoors ==
Nearby is Seven Mile Beach National Park, a well regarded area for bird watching, walking and fishing. Hang gliding, paragliding, sailing, windsurfing, and surfing are also enjoyed here. Black Head is suited to rock fishing, though it may be dangerous in high seas. A golf course is situated just north of the town. The rainforest remnants on the hill above the town and behind the beach contain interesting sub-tropical species, such as Snow-wood, Illawarra Plum and Camphorwood. The original vegetation was littoral (seaside) rainforest. Possums, wombats and falcons as well as many other indigenous animals may be seen near the town. Whales are commonly spotted in winter months heading north.

== History ==
=== Indigenous history ===
The Aboriginal Wodi Wodi people of the language group Dharawal had been using the land for around 20,000 years. They moved to different locations every six weeks or so in family groups. The fertile bushland would have provided a good supply of food.

=== European history ===
The first white people to visit the area were probably survivors of the shipwreck of Sydney Cove. They passed through this area in 1797. As early as 1814, cedar cutters explored the area around nearby Gerringong. The cedar cutters or "sawyers" as they called themselves were so described:

"... the true pioneers of European civilization. Long and before the farmer or grazier had set foot in those wilds-years prior to the novelty of clearing off and fencing in-the tent of the sawyer was a familiar object to the local blacks. With but few exceptions, the earlier cedar-cutters were convicts out on ticket of leave. Many of the blackest-dyed ruffians of their time were to be found in the ranks of the Illawarra sawyers."

In August 1824, the colonial Governor Thomas Brisbane instructed surveyor James McBrien to survey the land surrounding "Long Nose Point", now known as Black Head Point at Gerroa.

In 1929, Wizard Smith set an Australian land speed record at Seven Mile Beach. The first recording of a car speed of a hundred miles an hour in Australia was recorded on the beach.

On 11 January 1933 Sir Charles Kingsford Smith undertook his historic first commercial flight from Seven Mile Beach to New Zealand. The Southern Cross took 14 hours and ten minutes to make the journey to New Plymouth. The flight commenced at 2.50 am, watched by a crowd of thousands of visitors and local residents. Some had their car headlights turned on to assist Kingsford-Smith in his take off. A memorial plaque and lookout at Gerroa marks the event.

== Population ==
In the 2016 Census, there were 673 people in Gerroa. 77.2% of people were born in Australia and 84.3% of people spoke only English at home. The most common responses for religion were Catholic 27.3%, No Religion 24.5% and Anglican 18.1%.

== Climate ==
Gerroa has an oceanic climate (Köppen climate classification Cfb), with humid and warm summers and cool wet winters. Maximum summer temperatures usually range from 23 to 35°C. Though temperatures of 40 degrees are not unknown. In winter, temperatures can be as low as 5 degrees. The annual average rainfall at nearby Kiama is 1258 mm. The town is occasionally exposed to strong southerly and westerly winds. Westerly gusts of 140 km/h have been measured on two occasions in the past 10 years, the most recent occurrence causing some roof damage to houses near Black Head.

== Geology ==
Soils in the area are based on the Gerringong Volcanics, of Permian latite. As well as the volcanically based Budgong Sandstone, both of which produce relatively fertile red/brown soils. South of the town, by the river and beach the soils are alluvial and sandy.

== Notable residents of Gerroa ==
- Sally Fitzgibbons, surfer
- Fred Nile, politician
- Guy Sebastian, musician singer-songwriter (Australian Idol)
- Tyler Wright, surfer (2016 World Champion)
- John Turtle, medical academic
- Amos Anderson, Finnish newspaper owner and politician
