= Hoddles Track =

Mountain trail in Kiama, Australia

Hoddles Track is a track west of Kiama, New South Wales that goes from the summit of Saddleback Mountain west along a high ridge and then south to Foxground. It was named and created by Surveyor Robert Hoddle, and a plaque tells of its story atop Saddleback Mountain. It originally was used to convey produce to Kiama for shipping and stretched west to Bowral but after a better route over the escarpment was found it went derelict and now only a small portion remains, which is open for bushwalking. The track near the summit of Saddleback Mountain is very steep. Also near the summit it passes through remnant rainforest, which once covered the coastal plain.
