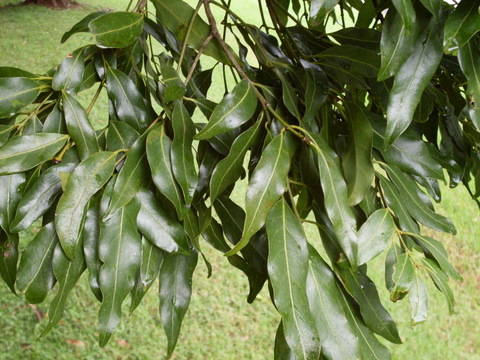
- Leaves at Foxground, NSW

Conservation status
- Least Concern (IUCN 3.1)

Scientific classification
- Kingdom: Plantae
- Clade: Tracheophytes
- Clade: Angiosperms
- Clade: Magnoliids
- Order: Laurales
- Family: Lauraceae
- Genus: Cinnamomum
- Species: C. oliveri

Binomial name
- Cinnamomum oliveri F.M.Bailey

= Cinnamomum oliveri =

Species of tree

Cinnamomum oliveri is a rainforest tree growing in the eastern coastal region of Australia. It occurs from the Illawarra district (34° S) in northeastern New South Wales to Cape York Peninsula at the northern tip of Queensland. The southernmost limit of its natural distribution is on the volcanic cliffs above the town of Gerroa and nearby on sand in rainforest behind Seven Mile Beach, New South Wales. It is a medium to large tree reaching around 30 metres tall and 75 cm in diameter.

Cinnamomum oliveri has several common names, such as camphorwood, Oliver's sassafras, black sassafras and cinnamonwood. The specific epithet honours Daniel Oliver of Kew Gardens.

== Habitat ==
Common in warm temperate rainforest areas on sedimentary soils in cool mountain situations, and also found in subtropical rainforest.

== Description ==
The trunk is cylindrical or occasionally flanged. It has grey or brown bark with a corky layer. The trunk has vertical lines of corky pustules.

Leaves are opposite, simple, with entire wavy margins, smooth, lanceolate, pointed, and gradually tapering to the base. They are shiny green above, and bluish grey glaucous below. They measure 8 to 15 cm long, and 2 to 4 cm broad. The leaf stalk is 6 to 12 mm long. On both surfaces, leaf venation is distinct and the midrib is raised.

In October and November, fragrant cream-coloured flowers form in panicles at the ends of branchlets, or in the forks of leaves near the ends of the branchlets. The fruit is a blue-black or black oval, shiny, aromatic drupe, about 12 mm long. Fruit ripen from February to April, often appearing with galls. Fruiting occurs roughly every seven years, and is prolific.

Fruit is eaten by rainforest birds, including the white-headed pigeon, pied currawong and green catbird. Like most Australian laurel fruit, removal of the fleshy aril is advised to assist seed germination. The seed has short longevity due to deterioration on drying.

== Uses ==
The bark of Cinnamomum oliveri contains tannin, and also an essential oil, rich in camphor, safrole and methyleugenol or cinnamic aldehyde and eugenol, depending on the chemical variety of the species. The oil may be used for medicinal purposes. The fragrant timber is used for indoor lining and cabinet work. Its weight is 560 to 660 kilograms per cubic metre.

== Gallery ==
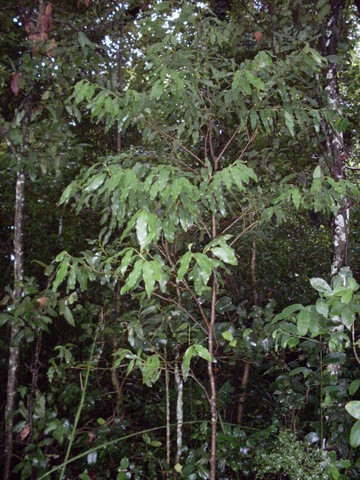
Cinnamomum oliveri juvenile, Foxground

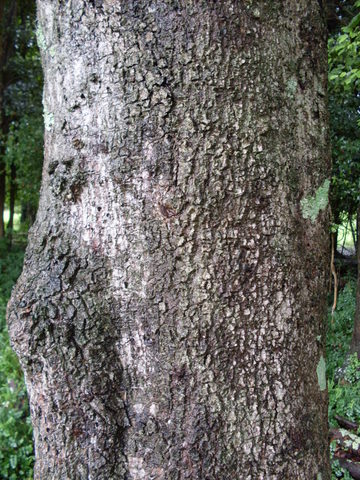
C. oliveri bark, Foxground

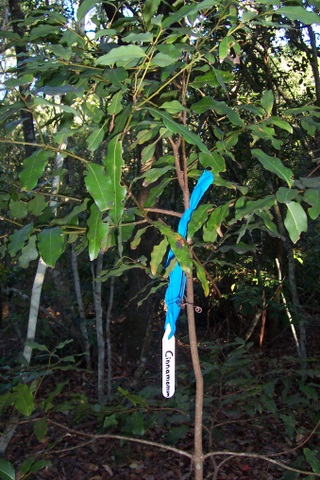
C. oliveri at Seven Mile Beach, New South Wales

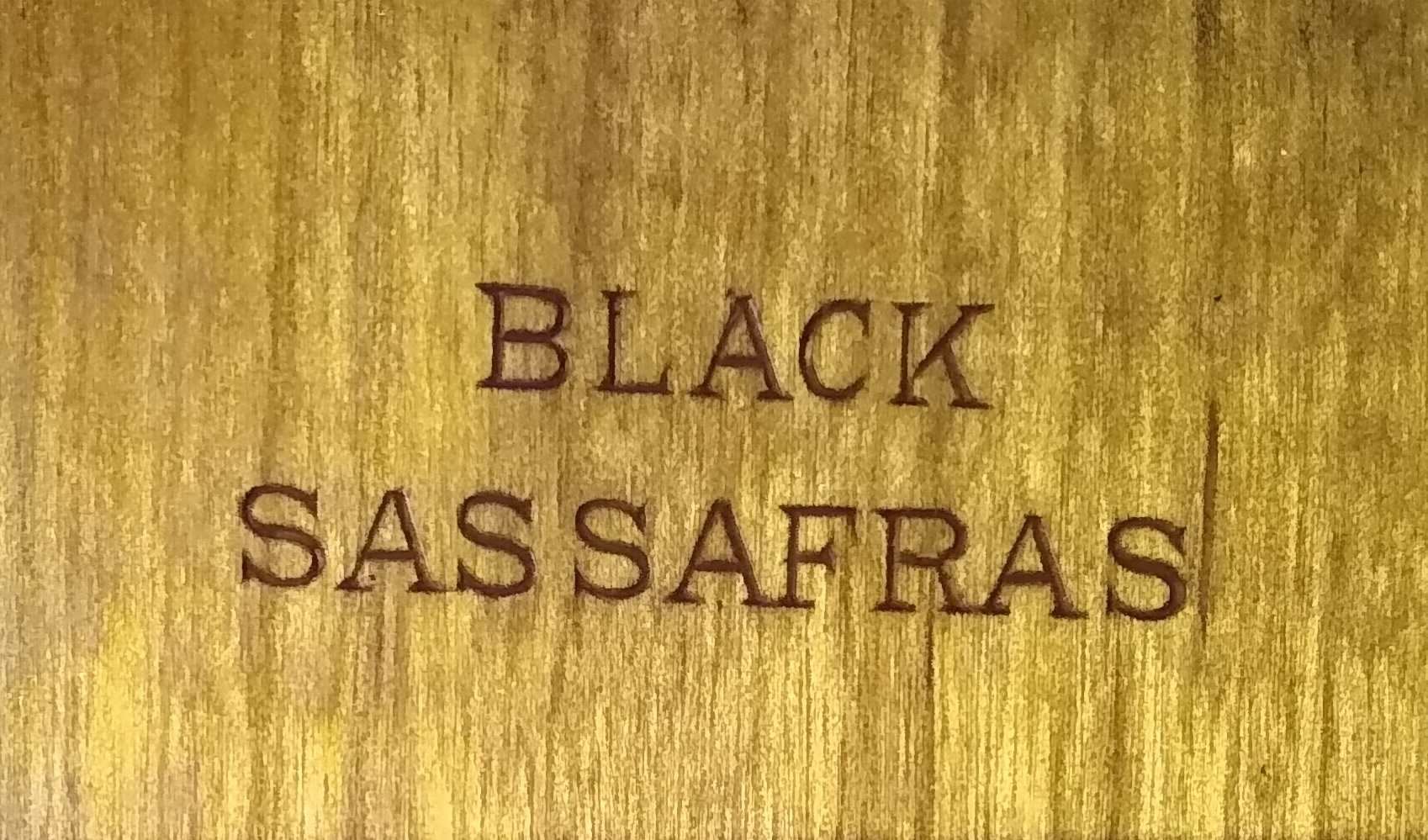
Black sassafras wood sample at the Powerhouse Museum, Sydney
