= Seven Mile Beach National Park =

National park in New South Wales

- IUCN category II (national park)
- Location within New South Wales
- Location: New South Wales
- Coordinates: 34°48′48″S 150°45′24″E
- Area: 8.981 km^{2} (3.468 sq mi)
- Established: 12 November 1971
- Governing body: National Parks and Wildlife Service (New South Wales)

Seven Mile Beach is a national park in New South Wales (Australia), 110 km southwest of Sydney.

It consists of tidal flats, islands and a coastal sand barrier built from river silt in the Shoalhaven River delta. It is important areas for migratory waders and sea birds and protects a large littoral rainforest. The wettest month of the year is March, and the driest is September. The average temperature ranges from 17 to 25 degrees Celsius.

There are great opportunities for bird watchers. They can observe king parrots, rainbow lorikeets, rosellas, wrens, New Holland honeyeaters and brown cuckoo doves.

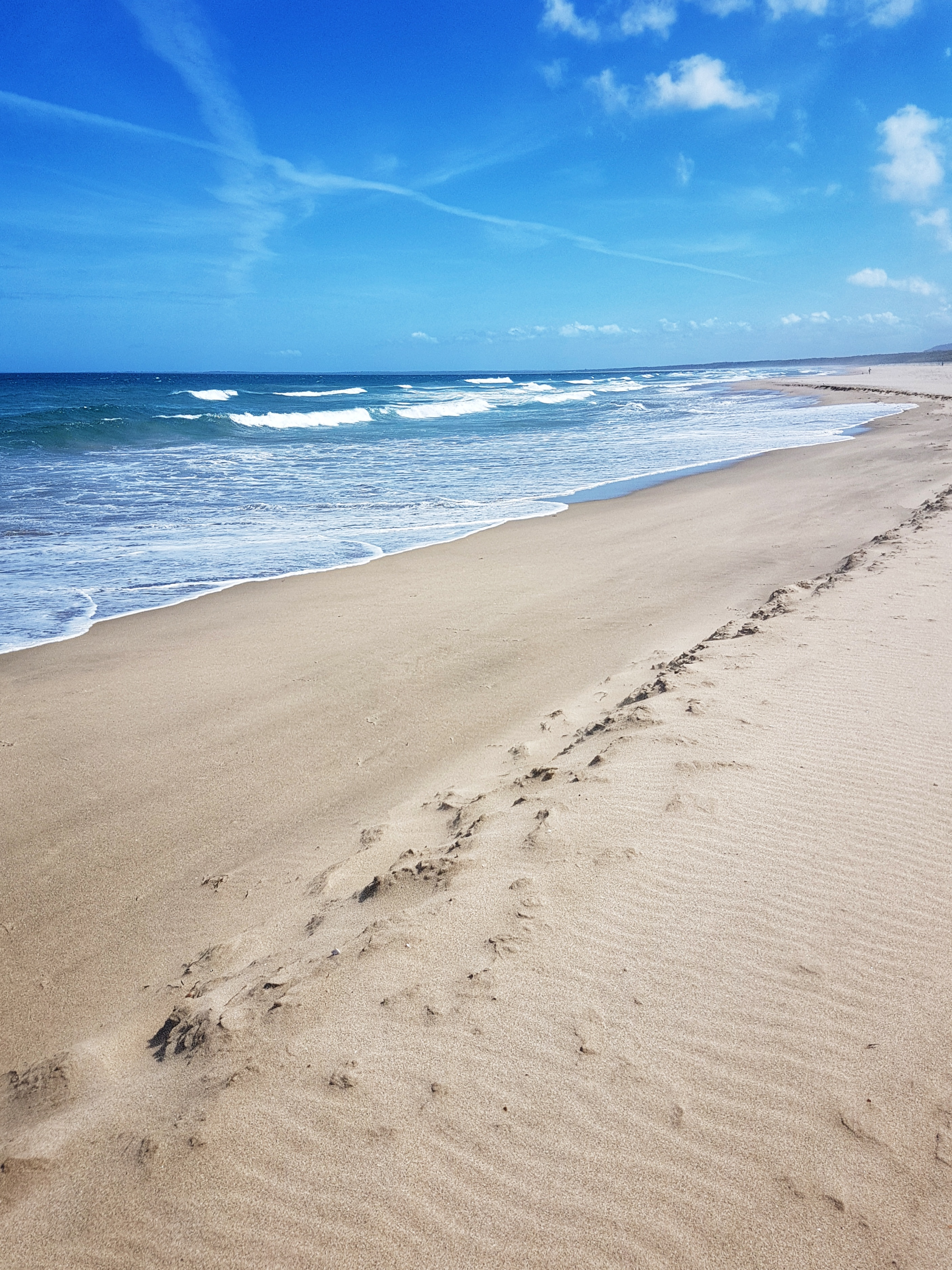

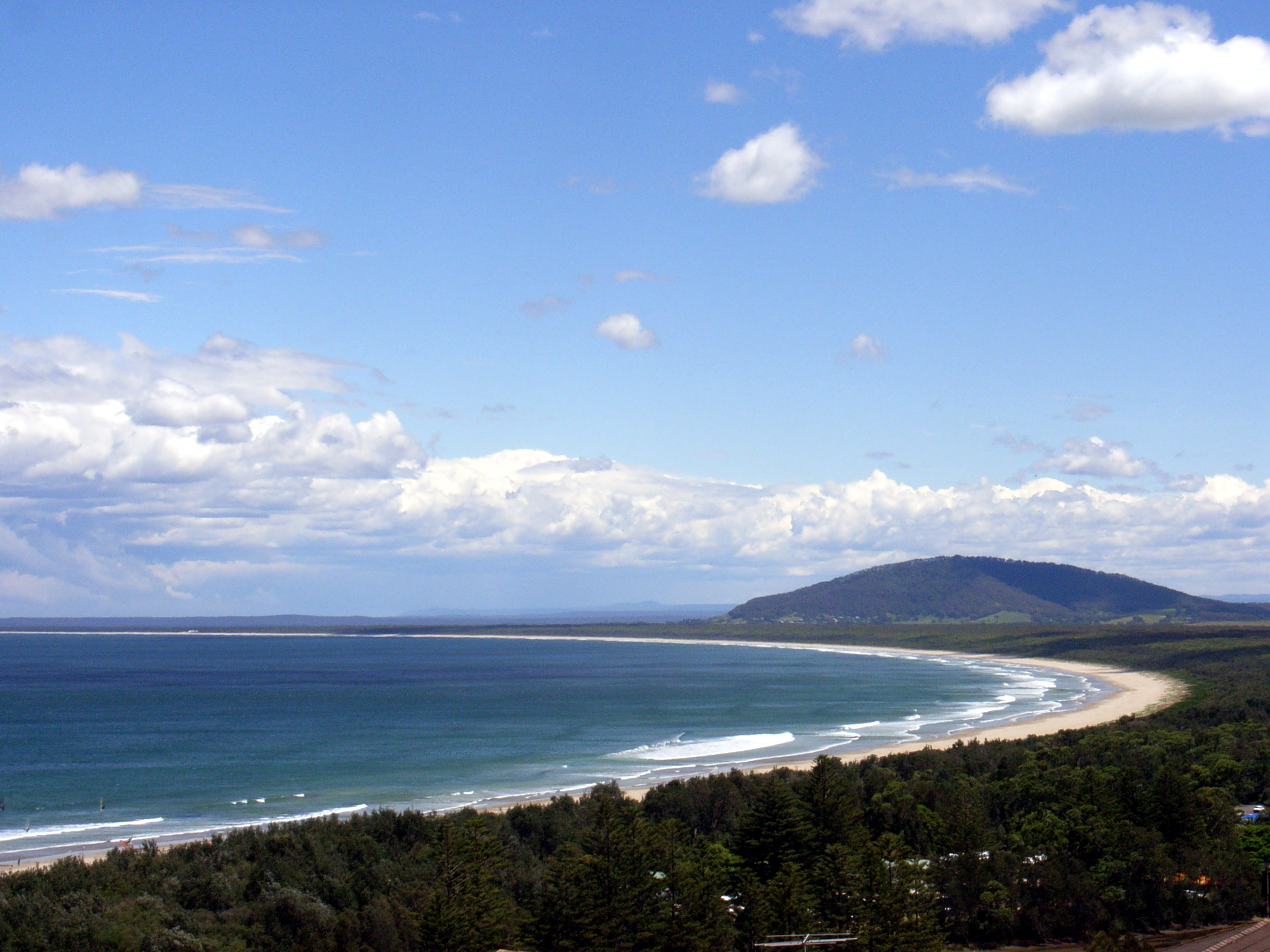

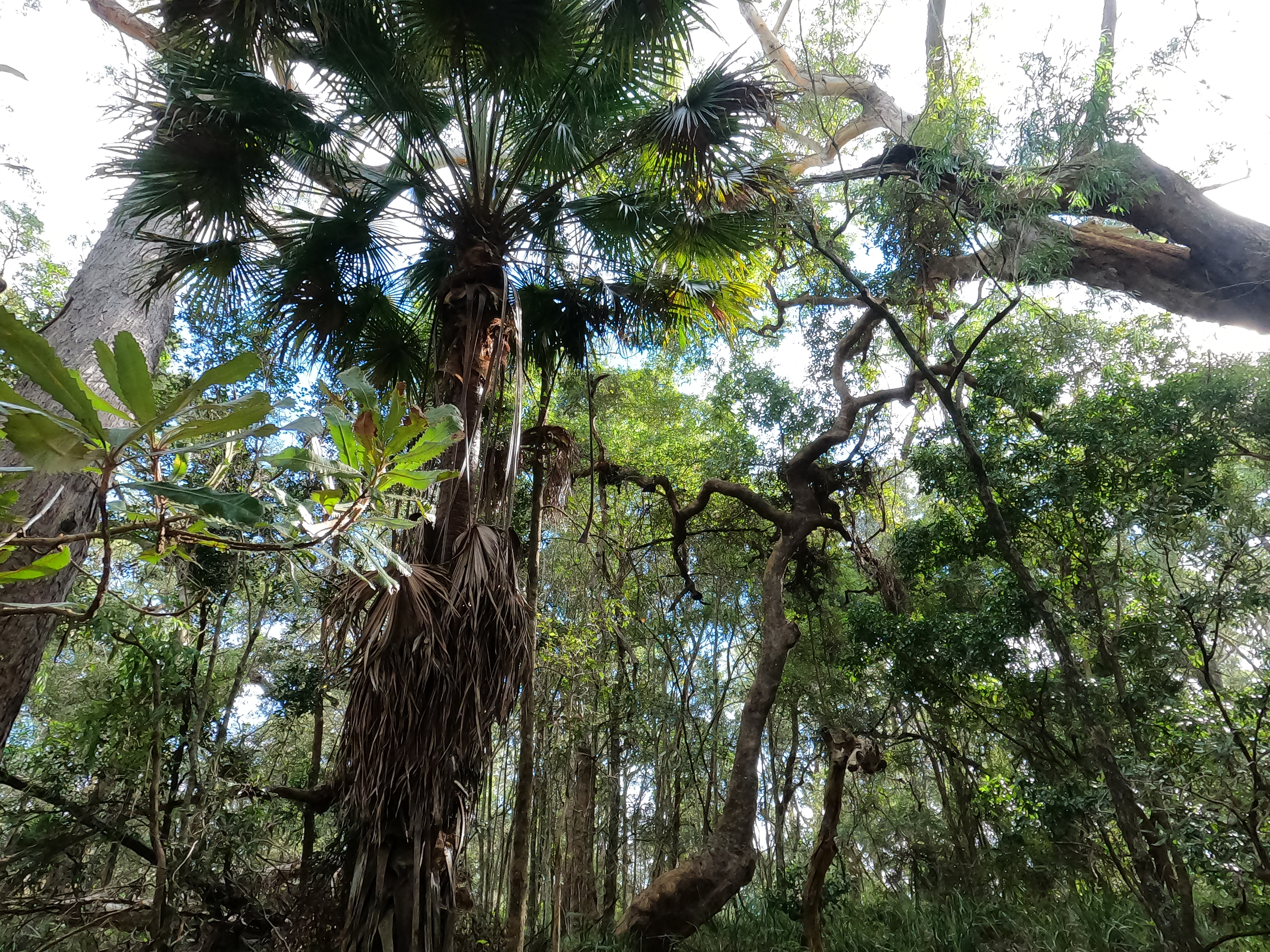

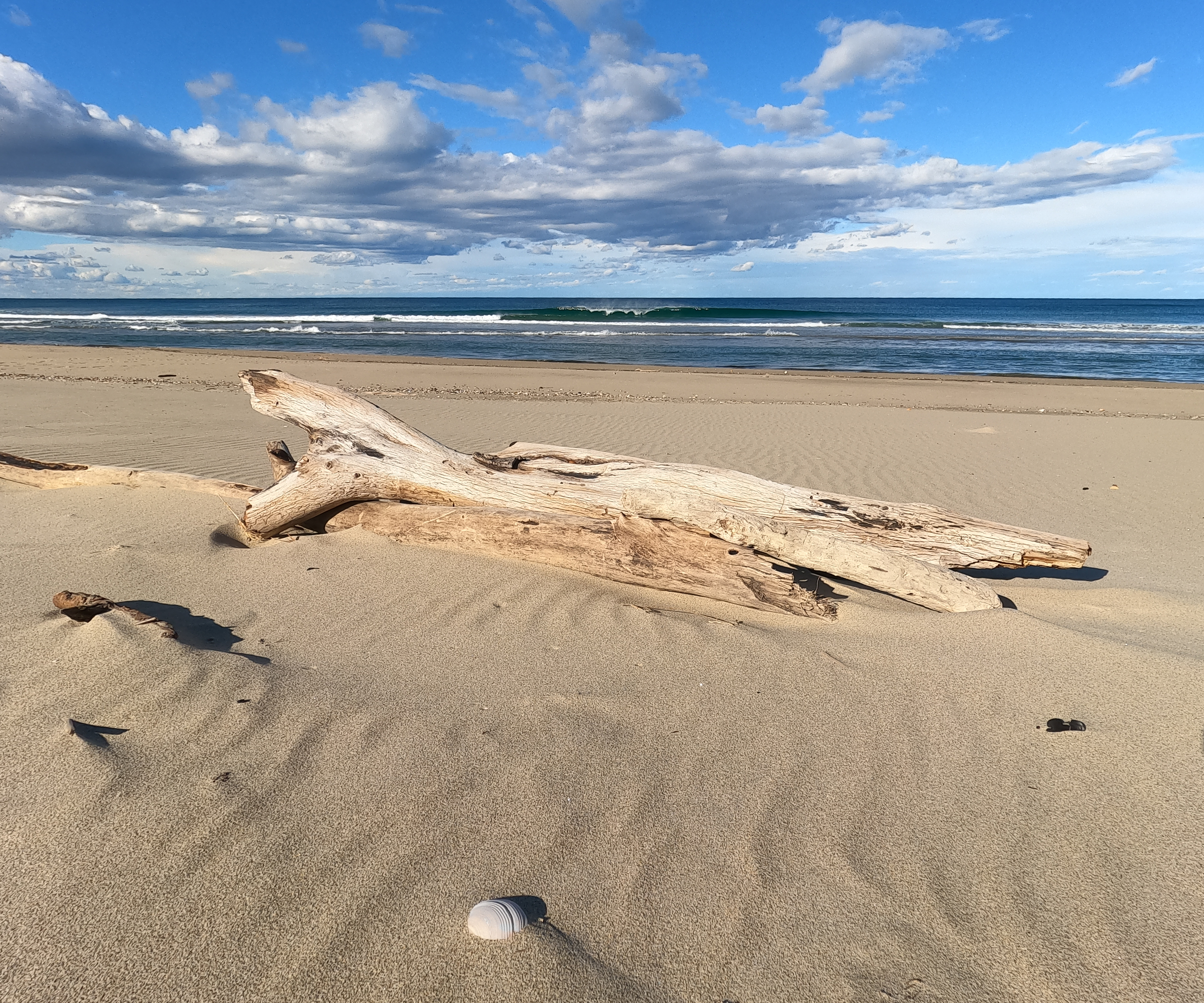

== See also ==
- Protected areas of New South Wales
