= Willow Vale, New South Wales (Kiama) =

Willow Vale New South Wales
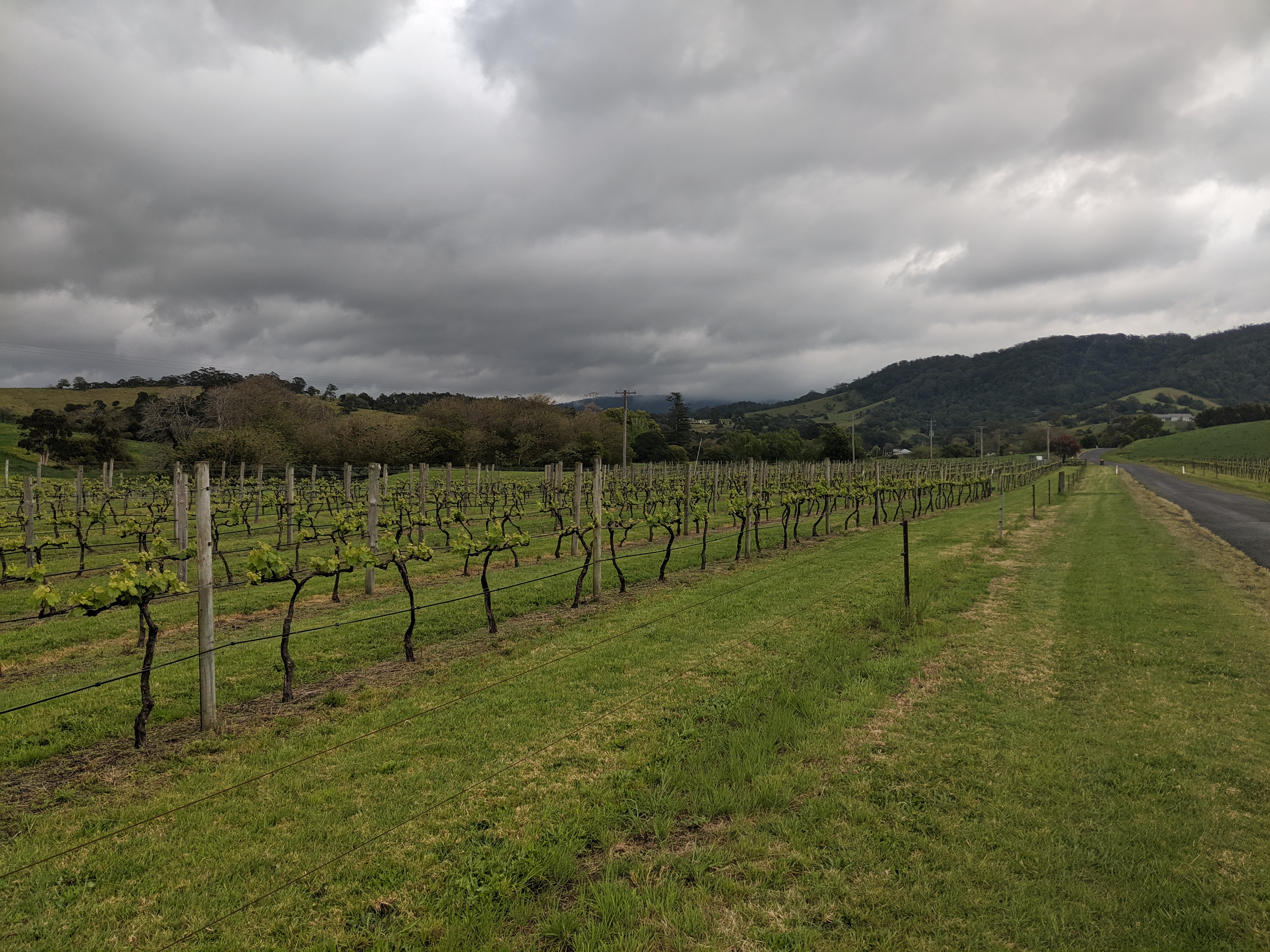

- Coordinates: 34°44′S 150°48′E
- Population: 73 (2021 census)
- Postcode(s): 2534
- Elevation: 37 m (121 ft)
- Location: 12 km (7 mi) from Kiama; 32 km (20 mi) from Nowra; 135 km (84 mi) from Sydney
- LGA(s): Municipality of Kiama
- State electorate(s): Kiama
- Federal division(s): Gilmore
Localities around Willow Vale:
Foxground	Rose Valley	Rose Valley
Broughton Village	Willow Vale	Gerringong
Broughton Village	Toolijooa	Gerringong

Willow Vale is a small town in New South Wales, Australia, in the Municipality of Kiama. It is made up of residences, dairy farms, and more recently the Crooked River Winery.

It is adjacent to the town of Gerringong, New South Wales on the South Coast and can be accessed from the Princes Highway.

Its highest point is higher than 100 m above sea level.
