= Municipality of Kiama =

Kiama Municipal Council
- Local government area
- Location in the Illawarra

- Interactive map of Kiama Municipal Council
- Coordinates: 34°39′S 150°51′E
- Country: Australia
- State: New South Wales
- Region: Illawarra
- Established: 11 August 1859
- Council seat: Kiama

Government
  - Mayor: Cameron McDonald
  - State electorate: Kiama
  - Federal division: Gilmore

Area
  - Total: 258 km^{2} (100 sq mi)

Population
  - Total: 23,074 (LGA 2021)
- Website: Kiama Municipal Council
LGAs around Kiama Municipal Council
Wingecarribee	Shellharbour	Tasman Sea
Wingecarribee	Kiama Municipal Council	Tasman Sea
Shoalhaven	Shoalhaven	Tasman Sea

The Municipality of Kiama is a local government area in the Illawarra region of New South Wales, Australia. The area is situated south of Shellharbour and the City of Wollongong and is located adjacent to the Pacific Ocean, the Princes Highway and the South Coast railway line.

== Towns and localities ==
The Municipality of Kiama contains the following towns and localities:

- Kiama
  - Bombo
  - Kiama Downs
  - Kiama Heights
  - Minnamurra
- Barren Grounds (part)
- Brogers Creek (part)
- Broughton Village (part)
- Budderoo
- Carrington Falls
- Curramore
- Foxground
- Gerringong
- Gerroa
- Jamberoo
- Jerrara
- Knights Hill
- Rose Valley
- Saddleback Mountain
- Toolijooa
- Upper Kangaroo Valley (part)
- Werri Beach
- Willow Vale

== Municipal history ==
The municipality of Kiama was created on 13 August 1859 by proclamation in the New South Wales Government Gazette by the Governor of New South Wales Sir William Thomas Denison. There were three wards: Kiama, Gerringong and Jamberoo. The first council comprised James Colley, John Sharpe and Joseph Pike (representing the Kiama Ward); John Hukins, John Colley and John Hanrahan (representing the Jamberoo Ward); and Joseph Blow, Robert Miller and James Robinson (representing the Gerringong Ward). The first mayor of Kiama was James Colley.

In 1871, Gerringong separated from the Kiama municipality and Jamberoo in 1892. In 1954, the Gerringong, Jamberoo and Kiama municipalities were amalgamated forming today's current municipal boundaries.

Kiama has had three female mayors: Ruth Devenney (1991 until 1992), Joyce Wheatley (1992 until 2000) and Sandra McCarthy (2000 until 2012).

A 2015 review of local government boundaries recommended that the Municipality of Kiama merge with the City of Shoalhaven to form a new council with an area of 4,825 square kilometres (1,863 sq mi) and support a population of approximately 120,000. The Kiama community along with the Shoalhaven community actively campaigned against any forced council amalgamation between the two councils. Kiama council held a non-compulsory poll on 7 May 2016 to grasp community attitudes to the proposal. The results of the poll concluded that 95% of the community supported remaining an independent council, with a 49.9% turnout. On 12 May 2016, the NSW State Government determined not to amalgamate Kiama and Shoalhaven council areas.

== Demographics ==
At the 2021 census the total population of the Municipality was 23,074 people. The median age of the community was 48 years.

About 8.2% of the population was born outside of Australia, with the top countries of birth being England at 5.2%, New Zealand at 1.3%, Scotland at 0.6%, the United States of America at 0.6% and Germany at 0.5%. The Indigenous Australian population is 2.3% of the total community population.

English was spoken as a first language by 91.0% of the population. The top response for languages spoken at home other than English was Italian at 0.4%, followed by German at 0.3%, Spanish at 0.3%, Greek at 0.3% and French at 0.3%.

== Council ==
=== Current composition and election method ===
The council of the municipality of Kiama is composed of nine councillors elected proportionally as a single ward. All councillors are elected for a fixed four-year term of office. The mayor is elected by the councillors at the first meeting of the council. The most recent election was held on 14 September 2024 and the makeup of the council is as follows:

Party	Councillors
Australian Labor Party	2
The Greens	1
Community Minded, Business Focused	3
Energy & Experience	1
Matt Brown-Danielle Steel Team	1
A Fresh Start for Kiama	1
Total	9

The current Council, elected in 2024, in order of election, is:

Councillor	Party	Notes
Cameron McDonald	Community Minded, Business Focused	Mayor
Imogen Draisma	Labor	Previous Deputy Mayor (2022-2024)
Melinda Lawton	The Greens	
Yasmin Tatrai	Energy and Experience	
Erica Warren	Community Minded, Business Focused	
Melissa Matters	Community Minded, Business Focused	Deputy Mayor
Matt Brown	Matt Brown-Danielle Steel Team	Former state MP for Kiama
Stuart Larkins	Labor	
Mike Cains	A Fresh Start for Kiama	

== Election results ==
=== 2024 ===
2024 New South Wales local elections: Kiama
Party	Candidate	Votes	%	±%
Community Minded Business Focused	1. Cameron McDonald (elected 1); 2. Erica Warren (elected 5); 3. Melissa Matters (elected 6); 4. Mark Burns; 5. Derek McMahon	5,087	34.9	+34.9
Labor	1. Imogen Draisma (elected 2); 2. Stuart Larkins (elected 8); 3. Lucy Abood; 4. Harrison Ledger; 5. Clare McInerney	2,315	15.9	−1.1
Greens	1. Melinda Lawton (elected 3); 2. Jordan Casson-Jones; 3. Mark Whalan; 4. Andrew Sloan; 5. Stuart Hall	2,259	15.5	−11.6
Energy & Experience	1. Yasmin Tatrai (elected 4); 2. Gail Morgan; 3. Henry Clyde Streamer; 4. Sue Mansfield; 5. Daniel Hill; 6. Andrew Prosser	1,554	10.6	+10.6
Matt Brown-Danielle Steel Team	1. Matt Brown (elected 7); 2. Danielle Steel; 3. Brendan Russell; 4. Kane Presland; 5. Joan Comber	1,237	8.5	−2.9
A Fresh Start for Kiama	1. Mike Cains (elected 9); 2. Marcus Hewitt; 3. Eric McAuley; 4. Cressida Cains; 5. James Cahill	1,093	7.5	+7.5
Reasonable Decisions by Reasonable People	1. Alan Smith; 2. Noel Killmore; 3. Belinda Camarda; 4. John Trevenar; 5. Narreda Grimley	687	4.7	+4.7
Your Community Candidates	1. Mark Croxford; 2. Robert Bartlett; 3. Darren Ormsby; 4. Michael O'Toole	362	2.5	−11.0
Total formal votes		14,594		
Informal votes		880		
Turnout		15,474		

=== 2021 ===
Elected councillor	Party
Kathy Rice	Greens
Imogen Draisma	Labor
Mark Croxford	YCC
Karen Renkema-Lang	S.A.F.E.
Neil Reilly	Team Reilly
Matt Brown	WLKGJ
Jodi Keast	Greens
Stuart Larkins	Labor
Warren Steel	Independent

2021 New South Wales local elections: Kiama
Party	Candidate	Votes	%	±%
	Greens	4,070	27.1	+3.3
	Labor	2,553	17.0	+17.0
	Your Community Candidates	2,030	13.5	
	You're in S.A.F.E. Hands	1,963	13.1	
	We Love Kiama Gerringong Jamberoo	1,706	11.4	
	Team Reilly	1,675	11.2	
	Independent	1,019	6.8	
Total formal votes		15,016	96.0	
Informal votes		628	4.0	
Turnout		15,644	86.9	

== See also ==
- Local government areas of New South Wales
