= Saddleback Mountain (New South Wales) =

Mountain in New South Wales, Australia

- Location within New South Wales

Highest point
- Elevation: 600 m (2,000 ft)
- Coordinates: 34°42′S 150°48′E

Geography
- Location: Illawarra region, New South Wales, Australia
- Parent range: Nuninuna Range

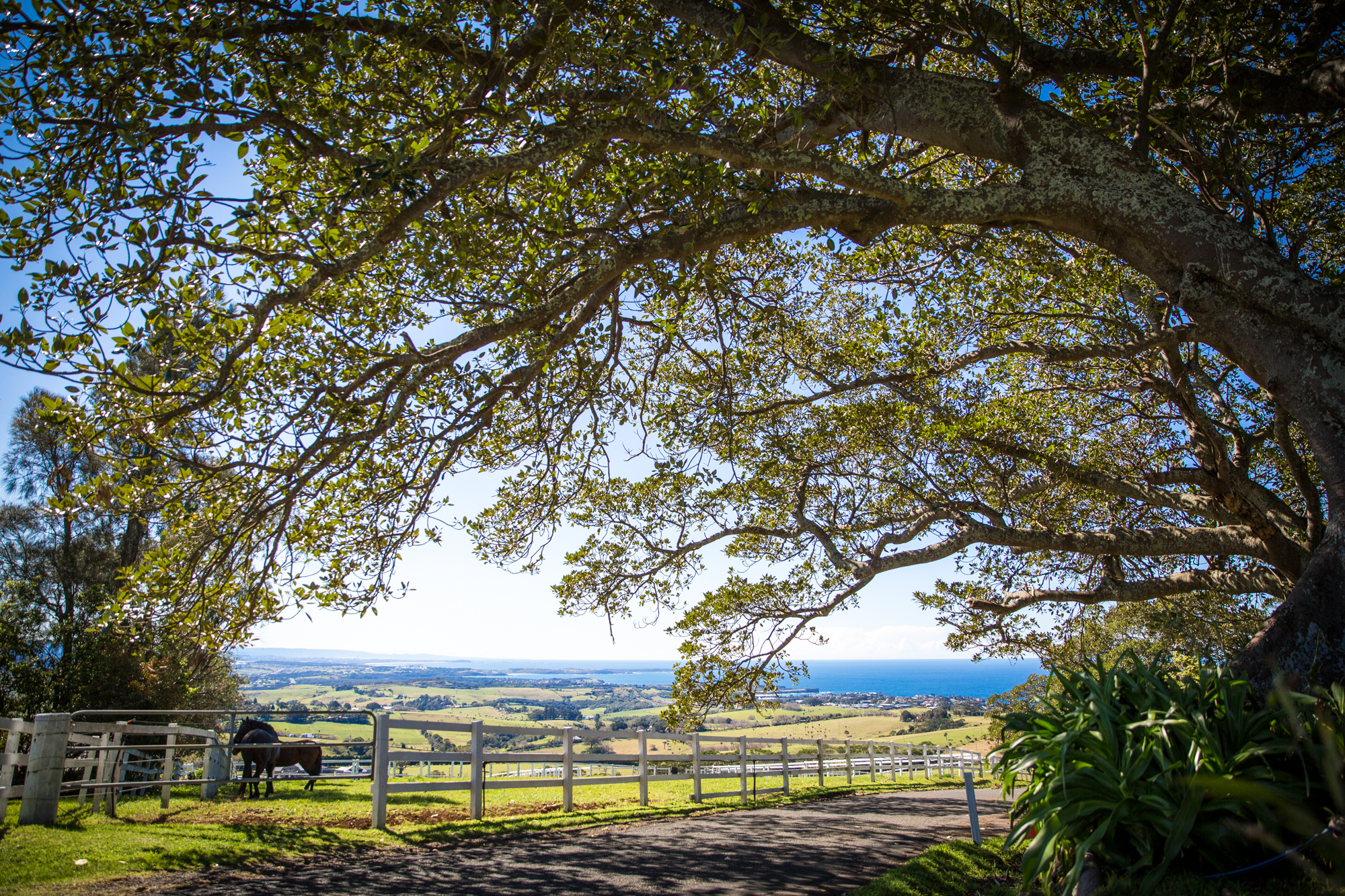
View from Saddleback overlooking the ocean, August 2016

Saddleback Mountain is a mountain near Kiama in the Illawarra region of New South Wales, Australia. The mountain rises to about 600 metres (2,000 ft) above sea level on the Illawarra escarpment and has views of Noorinan Mountain, 662 metres (2,172 ft) above sea level, and Barren Grounds Plateau to the west and south to Coolangatta Mountain and Pigeon House Mountain to Ulladulla, and north over Lake Illawarra, the Illawarra escarpment and to the Cronulla Sandhills and Kurnell Oil Refinery on a clear day.

== Location and features ==
When viewed from Kiama and Shellharbour it has a distinctive saddle-shaped peak and is connected to the southernmost tip of the Illawarra Escarpment (though the escarpment itself continues into Kangaroo Valley), Noorinan Mountain by a high ridge, on which is Hoddles Track, built by early surveyor Hoddle and which once stretched from Bowral to Kiama before a more suitable route was found quickly over the escarpment. This section goes to the edge of Barren Grounds Plateau (Noorinan Mountain) but does not allow access into the Barren Grounds reserve. An offshoot track goes to Foxground to the south of Noorinan Mountain promontory.

Its summit is reached by Saddleback Mountain Road, which goes from Kiama to the summit through a steep turn-off from the main road. This section is often used by walkers and cars but buses are not allowed due to the risk. Saddleback lookout, near the electric towers on the summit and the western and southern lookouts, has views and is popular with tourists and motorists who drive up the road to the summit which passed dairy country common in the area. The lookout is on a wooden projected deck, with views of Noorinan Mountain, Knights Hill, Lake Illiawarra, Stockyard Mountain and other features of the plain. The chimneys of Port Kembla stand out near the horizon. The west lookout looks to Noorinan Mountain promontory and at the Barren Grounds Plateau, and, to the south, Fox Mountain, Mount Coolangatta and the Shoalhaven River.

The foothills go down to Kiama and Gerringong and the sea and down to Jamberoo Valley and the Minnamurra River. The entire area was once covered by a subtropical rainforest known as the Illawarra Scrub but is now restricted to a small area around the summit lookout. The foothills include much dairy farming, and many historic dry walls remain. On the eastern ridge of the mountain is Saddleback House and in the northern foothills is Jerrara Dam, the region's first water supply, built in the 19th century. Just north of the summit is a second peak, lesser known, called Mount Brandon. Approximately three kilometres (1.9 mi) south is Fox Mountain, an extension of Saddleback with its own peak.

It is a collapsed volcanic vent.

== See also ==
- List of mountains of Australia § New South Wales
- No. 18 Radar Station RAAF, sited during World War II
- Hoddles Track
