= Bulli railway station =

Railway station in New South Wales, Australia

Bulli
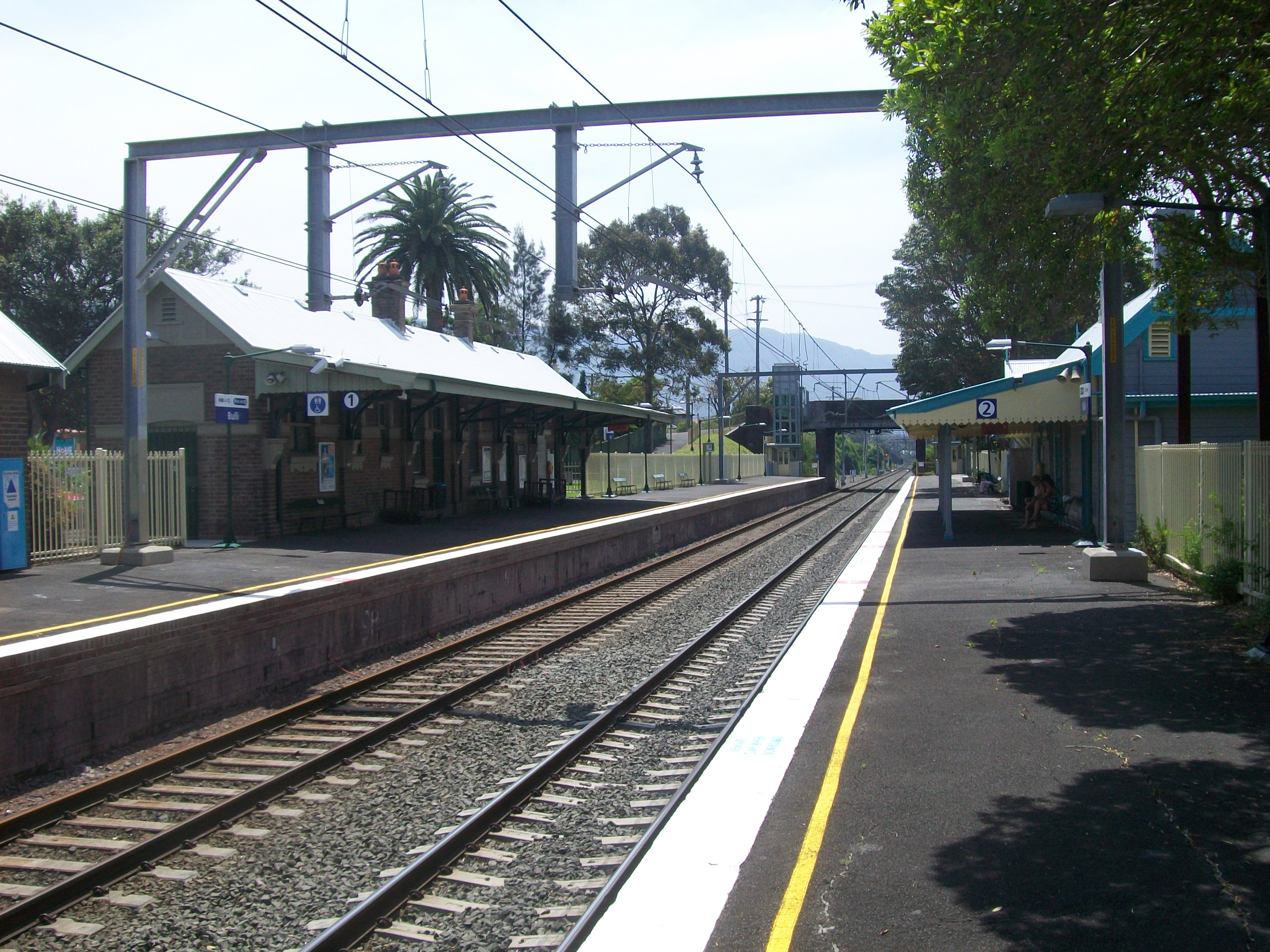
- Northbound view from Platform 2, October 2011

General information
- Location: Railway Street, Bulli; Australia
- Coordinates: 34°20′04″S 150°54′53″E
- Elevation: 17 metres (56 ft)
- Owner: Transport Asset Manager of New South Wales
- Operator: Sydney Trains
- Line: South Coast
- Distance: 72.15 kilometres (44.83 mi) from Central
- Platforms: 2 side
- Tracks: 2

Construction
- Structure type: Ground
- Accessible: Yes

Other information
- Status: Weekdays: Staffed: 5.35am to 6pm: Weekends and public holidays: Unstaffed
- Station code: BUI
- Website: Transport for NSW

History
- Opened: 21 June 1887

Passengers
- 2023: 83,300 (year); 228 (daily) (Sydney Trains, NSW TrainLink)

Services
Preceding station	Intercity Trains	Following station
Woonona towards Kiama or Port Kembla	South Coast Line	Thirroul towards Central or Bondi Junction
Location

Bulli railway station is a heritage-listed railway station on the South Coast railway line in New South Wales, Australia, serving the northern Wollongong suburb of Bulli. It was added to the New South Wales State Heritage Register on 30 August 2013.

== History ==
The name Bulli appears to have been first recorded in the Sydney Gazette of 22 April 1815. In 1823 reference was made to a small land holding at "Bull Eye". A 300-acre grant was promised to Cornelius O'Brien on 31 March 1821, whose house was the only one in this part of the district for some years. In 1841 the estate of Bulli, consisting of 900 acres, was offered for private sale and later was subdivided into farms of from 25 to 165 acres. For many years the name Bulli was used for all the country from Wollongong north to Coal Cliff.

The station opened on 21 June 1887 as part of the then isolated section of the Illawarra Line from Scarborough (Clifton) to Wollongong. The line was duplicated in 1915–1917. Bulli Railway Station was planned as a typical small but complete country station having a standard 3rd class timber station building, unusually also having a detached post office. A Station Master's residence and a goods shed were also constructed in 1887. The 1887 Station Master's cottage (no longer owned by RailCorp) is a good example of the standard structure built during the 1880s. A 5 tonne derrick crane was installed in 1890.

When the line was finally connected to Sydney in October 1888, the station's intended potential was realised which was further extended in 1916 with duplication reaching the station and construction of the Park Road overbridge with its steel beams brick abutments and balustrading. The line was then duplicated in 1923 to Woonona, resulting in the construction of the present standard brick platform building on the Up platform, and an out-of-room to the south of the new Platform 1 building. The 1917 plans show an extant "inspectors office" (no longer extant) to the north of the 1887 Platform 2 building. In later years the goods shed and cattle yard at the station were closed and the structure demolished.

In 1984 the Black Diamond Heritage Centre was formed by the Bulli community and they now have a large collection of local history and memorabilia on display in the central section of the 1887 Platform 2 building.

In 1986 the line was electrified as far as Wollongong.

To the south of Platform 2, a former South Bulli Colliery steam locomotive and some wagons have been plinthed.

== Platforms and services ==
Bulli has two side platforms and is serviced by Sydney Trains South Coast line services travelling from Waterfall and Thirroul to Port Kembla. Some peak hour and late night services operate to Sydney Central, Bondi Junction and Kiama.

Platform	Line	Stopping pattern	Notes
1	SCO	services to Thirroul & Waterfall peak hour & late night services to Sydney Central & Bondi Junction	
2	SCO	services to Port Kembla peak hour & late night services to Kiama	

== Description ==
The station precinct includes the Platform 1 building (1923), the out of room (1923), Platform 2 building (1887), Platform 1 (1923) and Platform 2 (1887).

Bulli Railway Station is located between Railway Street on the west and Franklin Avenue on the east, with the Park Road overbridge at the northern end of the station being a major access point to the platforms via modern lifts which have been attached to the southern side of the overbridge. The station has two perimeter platforms, each with asphalt surfaces and brick edges. Cream coloured powder coated aluminium fencing defines the station perimeters. There is a car park on the western side of the station (adjacent to the 1923 Platform 1 building), and a curved driveway off Franklin Avenue on the eastern side to access the 1887 Platform 2 building.

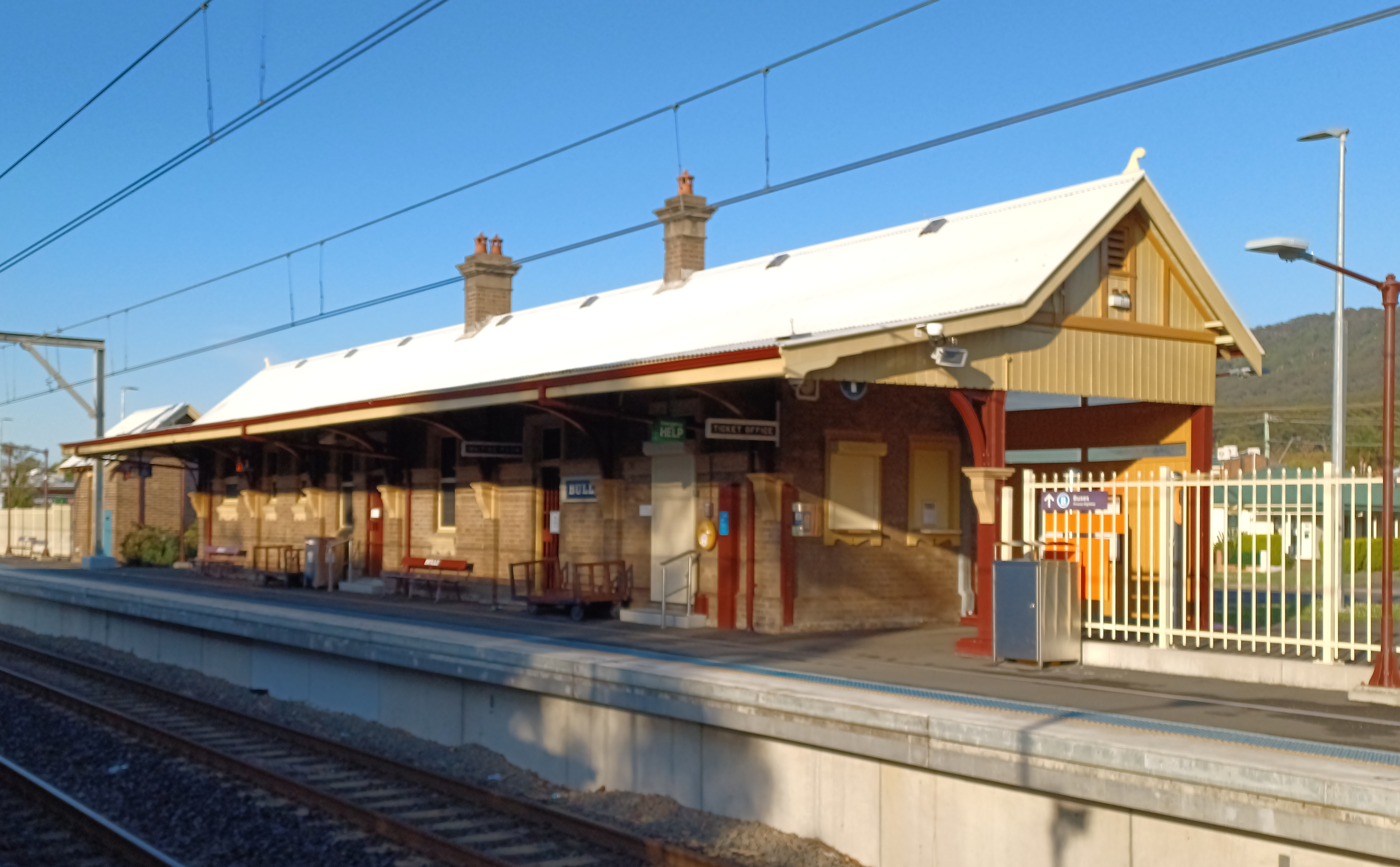
Platform 1 Building

Platform 1 Building (1923)

A large freestanding face brick platform building with a gabled corrugated steel roof. The building features timber tongue and grooved boarding and simple timber bargeboards to gable ends at north and south ends. There are two brick chimneys to the roof. The building has a skillion corrugated steel roof to a cantilevered awning on the platform (east) elevation, the awning being cantilevered on steel brackets mounted on decorative stucco wall brackets. Windows are timber framed double hung, with 9-pane top sashes with multicoloured glass panes. Window and door openings are defined with decorative stucco surrounds. There are some timber flush doors and steel security doors, some 6-pane fanlights with multicoloured glass panes. There is a weatherboard gabled shelter extension at the northern end of the building to shelter the ticket office area.

This building was originally planned with a men's toilet, ladies toilet, ladies waiting room, general waiting room, booking office and open booking lobby. The general waiting room has modern floor tiling and a modern security screen door, however retains an original ripple iron ceiling with a metal ceiling rose, and a chimney breast, though the fireplace has been blocked up, and original high moulded timber skirting boards.

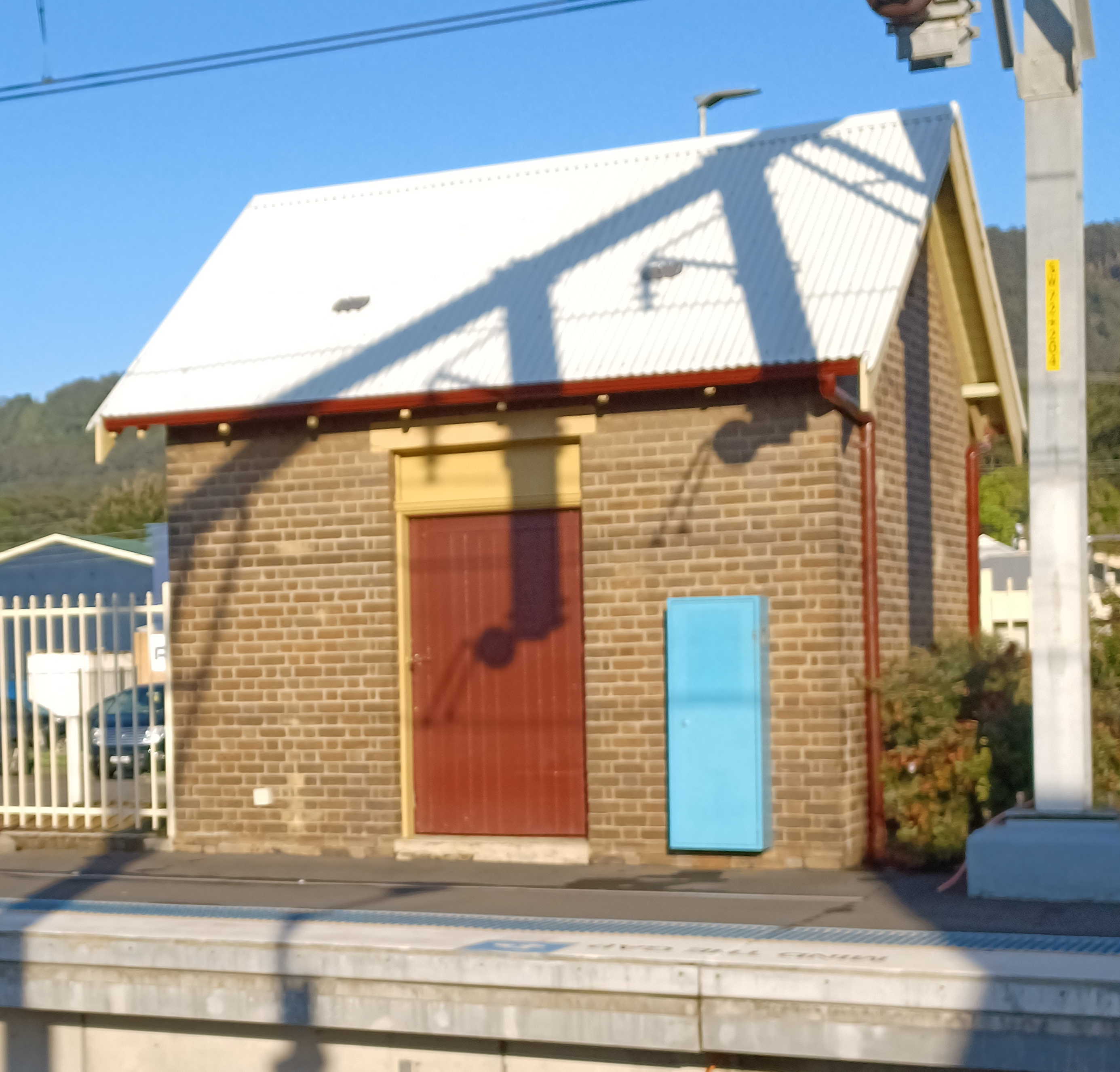
Out of room

Out of room (1923)

A small freestanding single storey brick lamp room located at the southern end of Platform 1. The building is face brick, with a gabled Colorbond roof, exposed timber rafter ends to eaves, and simple timber barge boards to the north and south gable ends. The gable ends each have rectangular timber louvred vents. The building has timber tongue and grooved boarded double doors opening on to the platform, with a fanlight above. There is a concrete lintel above the doorway.

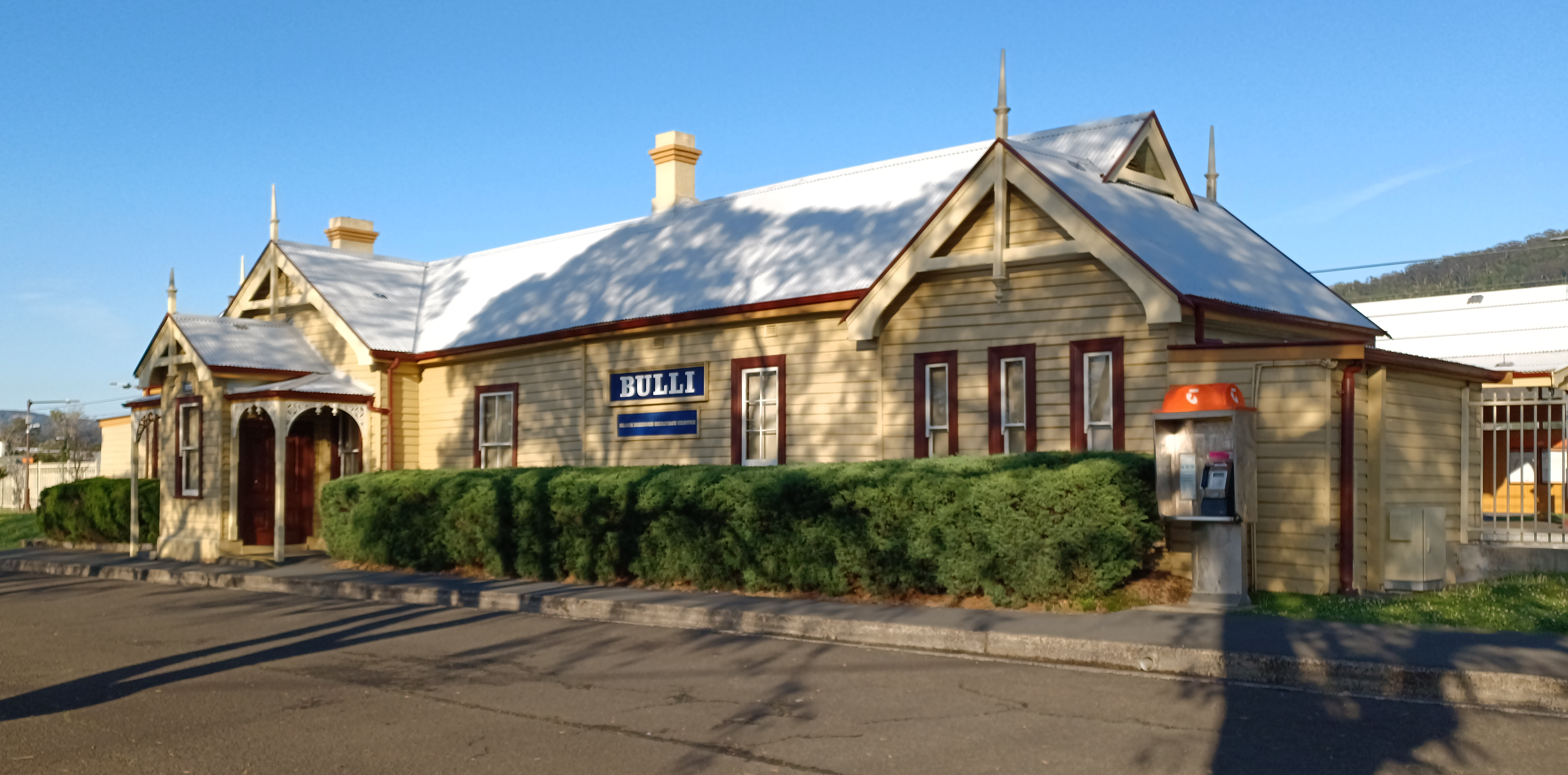
Platform 2 Building

Platform 2 Building (1887)

This is a single storey gabled weatherboard platform building with weatherboard extensions at both north and south ends. The building has a corrugated steel gabled roof with 2 painted brick chimneys. The gable ends feature decorative timber bargeboards, pendants and finials, and pairs of rectangular timber louvred vents. On the west (platform) elevation, there is a skillion corrugated steel roofed awning supported on timber stop chamfered posts setback from the platform edge. This awning extends along the southern half of the original gabled section of the platform building. The awning has decorative timber valances to both north and south ends. There are some 2 panel double doors with glazing panels to top, 8-paned fanlights, and timber framed double hung windows. The extension at the southern end is a simple skillion roofed weatherboard room. The extensions at the northern end are a gabled weatherboard room with the gable end transverse to the main ridge of the building's roof. The gable ends to this extension feature timber bargeboards, pendants and finials matching those of the original section of the building. To the north of this extension is a further simple weatherboard skillion roofed room, which is the men's toilets. The main public entrance to the building was formerly from the street through a central passage with large timber panelled double doors at either side. This doorway is covered by a porch on the eastern elevation with bull nose corrugated iron roofs and cast iron lace frieze. The matching door to the platform is sheltered by the platform awning. Interior: Not accessed 2009. 1916 plans for alterations show the interior plan as an office; a combined parcels & Out-of-room; a signal box (converted from a parcels room), a central booking office, a general waiting room, with porch and verandas; gents and ladies toilets. The building still had a central booking office with staff and passenger facilities on either side in 2004.

Platforms (1923, 1887)

Two perimeter platforms, each with asphalt surfaces and brick edges.

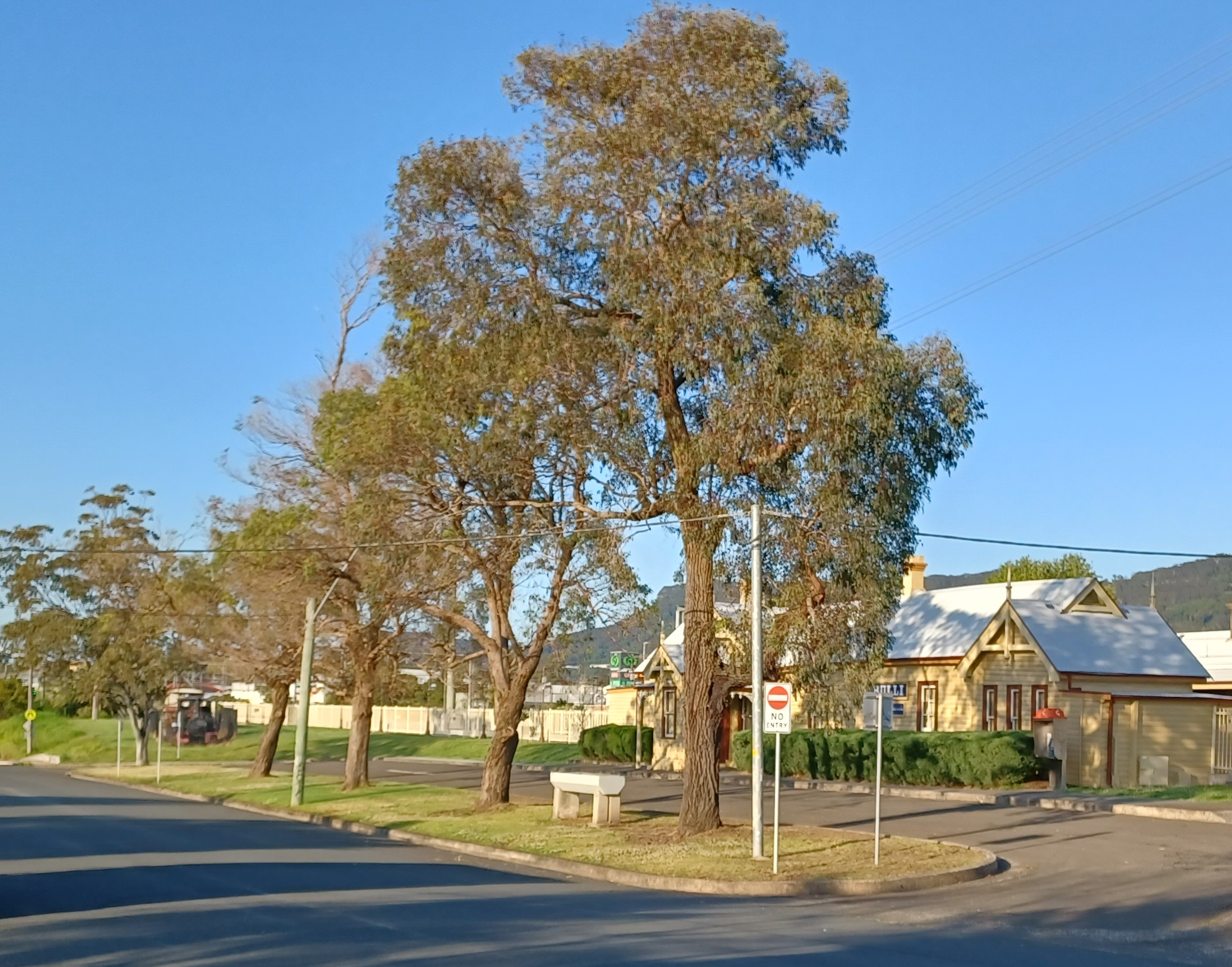
Tree-planted island east of the Platform 2 building

Landscape/Natural Features

There is a tree-planted island park along Franklin Street east of the Platform 2 building, which enhances its setting. There is a circular drive around the island park to access the Platform 2 building, which appears to be an early feature of the station's landscape setting.

Moveable Items

Significant moveable items include the 1923 waiting room and ticket office signs attached to Platform 1 building and timber luggage trolley. There are also a number of timber station signs on timber posts and station seats on the platform.

The following items were confirmed to be extant in 2012 by the Black Diamond Heritage Centre: 20 lever signal frame, interlocking signal frame, electrical repeaters, eyeball instrument, 4 x block instruments, next train/platform indicator, Bulli Lamp (Kerosene), Ptc small lamp, wooden ticket sales box, safe 2 wheeled trolley, 2 × 4 wheeled luggage trolleys, timber ambulance box no.420/D, miscellaneous records of Bulli Railway Station, timber boxes relating to telecommunications, standard clip for T rails, fog signal flags and containers, ticket / dated punch, collection of fettlers tools, flat top fettlers, trolley and wheels, tall writing desk, 3 x Timber tables, 2 x Small timber cupboards, timber service counter, stretcher, Bulli Sidings Diagram, enamelled small Bulli platform sign, Timber Pigeon hole storage, set of 4 kerosene drums made into draws

Condition

The Platform 1 Building and Platforms were reported to be in good condition as at 17 October 2012. The Platform 2 building was assessed as being in moderate condition, as was the moveable items collection, with timber station signs having been damaged.

The station has a high level of integrity.

=== Modifications and dates ===
- 1902: platform lengthened.
- 1916: signal box built, repairs and upgrading to weatherboard 1887 Platform 2 building.
- 1919: platform rebuilt in brick.
- 1923: Platform 1 building and Out-of-room erected (plans dated 1917), Park Road overbridge erected (plans dated 1922).
- Post 1920s (date unknown): removal of goods shed, crane and cattle yard from west side of station; removal of lamp room (originally south of 1887 Platform 2 building) and district supers office (north of 1887 platform building) from east side of station.
- 1985: automatic signalling installed.
- 1986: line electrified.
- 2009: Station building (down side) re-roofed, re-painted, damaged timber replaced.

== Heritage listing ==
Bulli Railway Station is significant for its rare 1887 station building surviving from the first period of construction of the Illawarra line. The 1887 station building is one of the most intact of only four remaining examples of an 1880s third-class weatherboard station building along the Illawarra line, and remains as a tangible reminder of the role of Bulli Station as a transport hub for the village of Bulli since 1887. The 1923 station building and lamp room demonstrate the expansion of railway activity at Bulli into the early 20th century associated with duplication of the line during the 1920s. The juxtaposition of the 1887 and 1923 platform buildings demonstrate the evolution of railway station architecture during this period, and are both excellent examples of their periods and style. The site has special associations with the staff and volunteers of the Black Diamond District Heritage Centre, located in the central section of the 1887 station building, who continue to be instrumental in the ongoing preservation and interpretation of the site.

Bulli railway station was listed on the New South Wales State Heritage Register on 30 August 2013 having satisfied the following criteria.

The place is important in demonstrating the course, or pattern, of cultural or natural history in New South Wales.

Bulli Railway Station is of historical significance for its 1887 Platform 2 building surviving from the first period of construction of the Illawarra line, and for its 1923 Platform 1 building and out of room, which demonstrate the duplication of the line at this time. Bulli Railway Station is also of historical significance for its role as a transport hub for the village of Bulli since 1887, and demonstrates expansion of the railway station into the early 20th century.

The place is important in demonstrating aesthetic characteristics and/or a high degree of creative or technical achievement in New South Wales.

Bulli Railway Station is of aesthetic significance for its 1887 and 1923 platform buildings, which demonstrate changing railway station architecture over this period. The 1887 Platform 2 building at Bulli is one of the best examples of an 1880s weatherboard third class station building surviving on the Illawarra line (other examples at Albion Park, Dapto and Thirroul). The 1923 brick platform building is a good representative example of a Federation period railway station building, of a type and construction material which is common on the Illawarra line.

The place has strong or special association with a particular community or cultural group in New South Wales for social, cultural or spiritual reasons.

The presence of the Black Diamond District Heritage Centre occupying the central section of the 1887 Platform 2 building indicates that the place has a specific social significance for the local community.

The place possesses uncommon, rare or endangered aspects of the cultural or natural history of New South Wales.

The 1887 Platform 2 building at Bulli is one of the best examples of an 1887 weatherboard third class platform building surviving on the Illawarra line, and one of the few buildings extant from the 1887 period of the lines' construction, with most others being replaced in 1915 for the duplication of the line. The Bulli Platform 2 building is one of only four extant 1887 weatherboard 3rd class platform buildings remaining on the Illawarra line, the others being at Albion Park Rail, Dapto and Thirroul. With the platform building at Albion Park Rail, the Bulli Platform 2 building is one of the two most intact extant platform buildings of this type.

The place is important in demonstrating the principal characteristics of a class of cultural or natural places/environments in New South Wales.

The 1887 and 1923 platform buildings and Out-of-room represent standard design railway station architecture of their respective periods of construction. Bulli, with its 1887 weatherboard third class platform building, is one of only 4 stations on the Illawarra line with examples of weatherboard versions of this type of platform building (other examples at Albion Park, Dapto and Thirroul).
