= Woonona railway station =

Railway station in New South Wales, Australia

Woonona
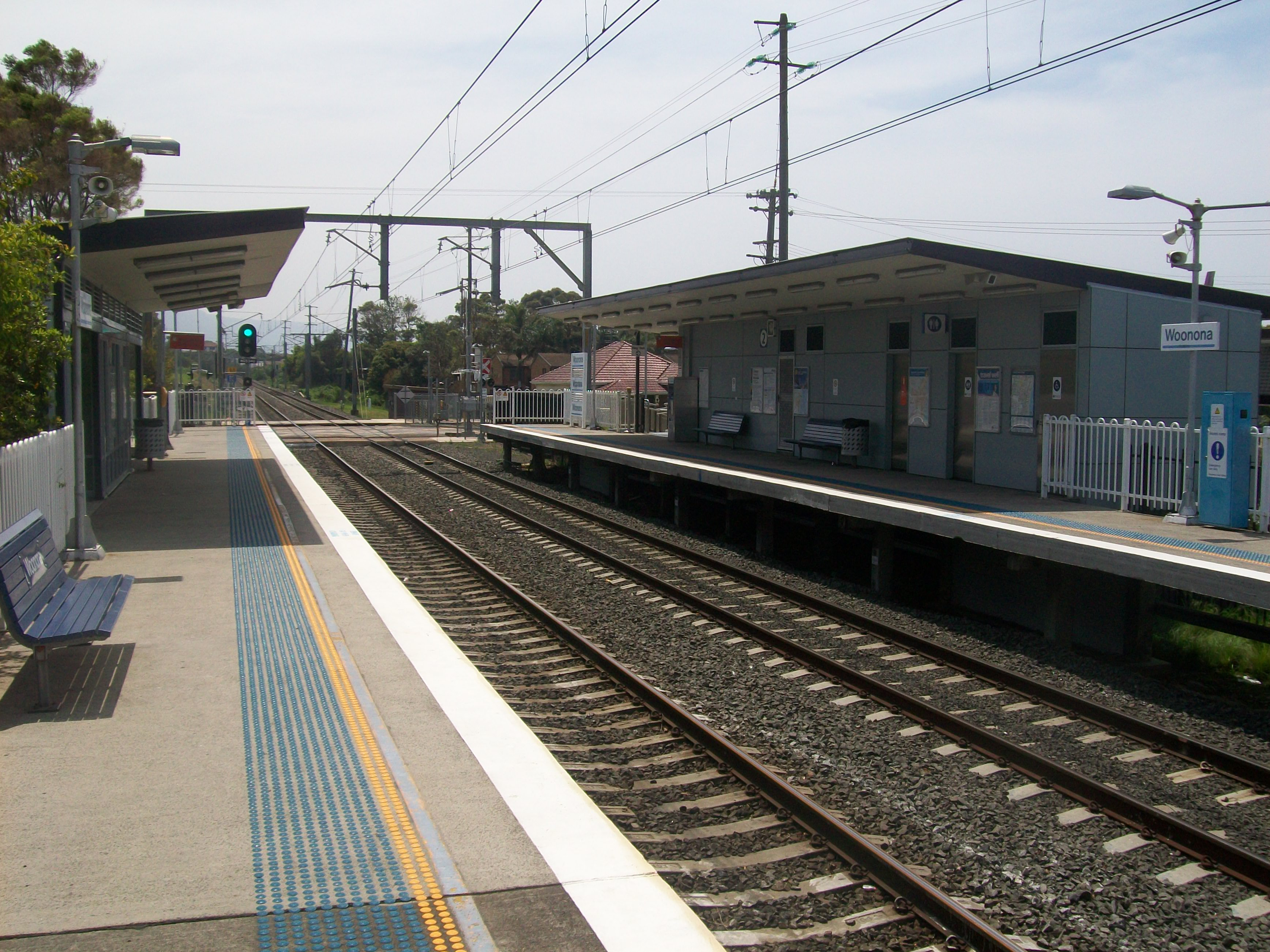
- Northbound view from Platform 1, October 2011

General information
- Location: Park Road, Woonona; Australia
- Coordinates: 34°20′59″S 150°54′55″E
- Elevation: 10 metres (33 ft)
- Owner: Transport Asset Manager of New South Wales
- Operator: Sydney Trains
- Line: South Coast
- Distance: 73.99 kilometres (45.98 mi) from Central
- Platforms: 2 side
- Tracks: 2
- Connections: Bus

Construction
- Structure type: Ground
- Parking: Yes
- Accessible: Assisted Access

Other information
- Status: Weekdays: Staffed: 5.35am to 9.35am, 2pm to 6pm: Weekends and public holidays: Unstaffed
- Station code: WOJ
- Website: Transport for NSW

History
- Opened: 25 August 1919

Passengers
- 2023: 65,020 (year); 178 (daily) (Sydney Trains, NSW TrainLink)

Services
Preceding station	Intercity Trains	Following station
Bellambi towards Kiama or Port Kembla	South Coast Line	Bulli towards Central or Bondi Junction
Location

Woonona railway station is located on the South Coast railway line in New South Wales, Australia, serving the northern Wollongong suburb of Woonona. It opened on 25 August 1919.

== Platforms and services ==
Woonona has two side platforms and is serviced by Sydney Trains South Coast line services travelling from Waterfall and Thirroul to Port Kembla. Some peak hour and late night services operate to Sydney Central, Bondi Junction and Kiama.

Platform	Line	Stopping pattern	Notes
1	SCO	services to Thirroul & Waterfall peak hour & late night services to Sydney Central & Bondi Junction	
2	SCO	services to Port Kembla peak hour & late night services to Kiama	

== Transport links ==
Dion's Bus Service operates two bus routes via Woonona station, under contract to Transport for NSW:

- 92: Bulli to Wollongong
- 93: Bulli to University of Wollongong
