= Heritage Hotel =

Heritage Hotel may refer to:

- Heritage Hotel, Bulli, New South Wales
- Heritage Hotel, Rockhampton, Queensland
