= Bellambi =

- Suburb
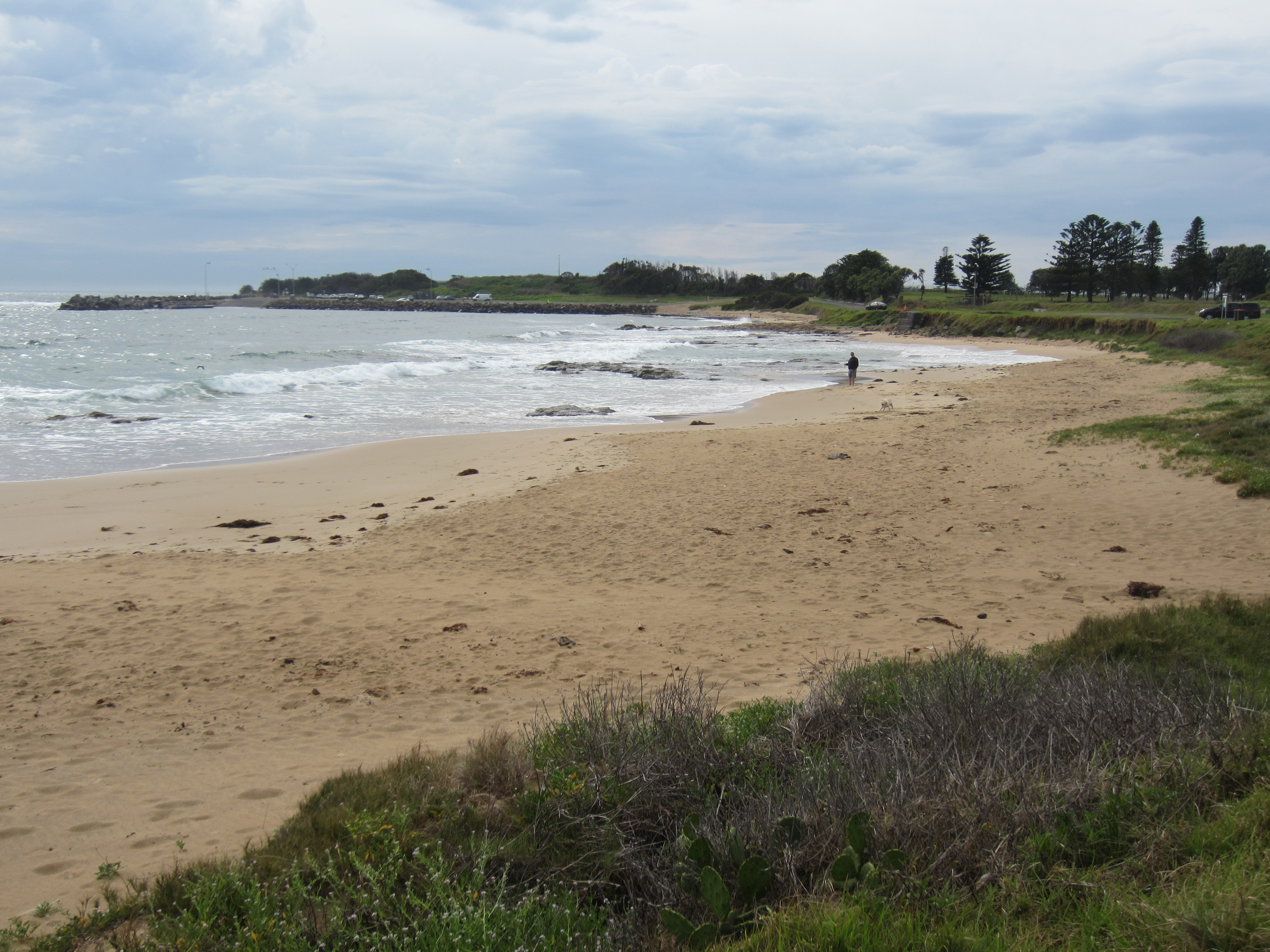
- Former site of the South Bulli coal jetty on the northern side of Bellambi Point

- Coordinates: 34°22′S 150°55′E
- Country: Australia
- State: New South Wales
- City: Wollongong
- LGA: City of Wollongong
- Location: 77 km (48 mi) from Sydney; 8 km (5.0 mi) from Wollongong

Government
  - State electorate: Keira
  - Federal division: Cunningham
- Elevation: 10 m (33 ft)

Population
  - Total: 4,039 (2021 census)
- Postcode: 2518
- Mean max temp: 21.5 °C (70.7 °F)
- Mean min temp: 14.8 °C (58.6 °F)
- Annual rainfall: 1,146.2 mm (45.13 in)
Suburbs around Bellambi
Russell Vale	Woonona
	Bellambi
Corrimal	East Corrimal

Bellambi (/bɛˈlæmbi/) is a suburb of Wollongong in the Illawarra region of New South Wales, Australia. It has a railway station (opened 1889) on the NSW TrainLink South Coast Line.

Bellambi is situated directly north of Corrimal and east of Russell Vale. It has a beach, Bellambi Beach, on the Wollongong to Thirroul Bike Track.

Bellambi lies on the flat northern Illawarra coastal plain, with views of the escarpment to the west, one of note being Broker's Nose, 440 metres high. To the east is Bellambi Beach and a creek inlet in a reserve, and to the south of the inlet is Bellambi Harbour (formerly known as Port Bellambi) and Bellambi Point.

The original jetty was constructed in 1858. On 28 August 1862 a telegraph line was constructed between Wollongong and Bellambi. In 1863 a second jetty was built at the harbour. In 1887 a new jetty was constructed at Bellambi Bay. In 1927 the Bellambi Mines Rescue Station was established. The public school was opened in 1956. In 1965 the rock pool was under construction.

== Bellambi Point ==
Bellambi Point incorporates Bellambi Lagoon Reserve, a protected area mostly forested in swamp oaks (casuarina), coastal sclerophyll and saltmarsh. A small hill rises to about ten metres and has recently been fenced off due to erosion. This was a site of sand mining for some time. The site contains dune and wetland vegetation communities, a number of rare plant species and is an important habitat with more than 50 bird species using the site including a pair of White Breasted Sea Eagles. There has been an active Bushcare group at the site since 2003.

== Aboriginal significance ==
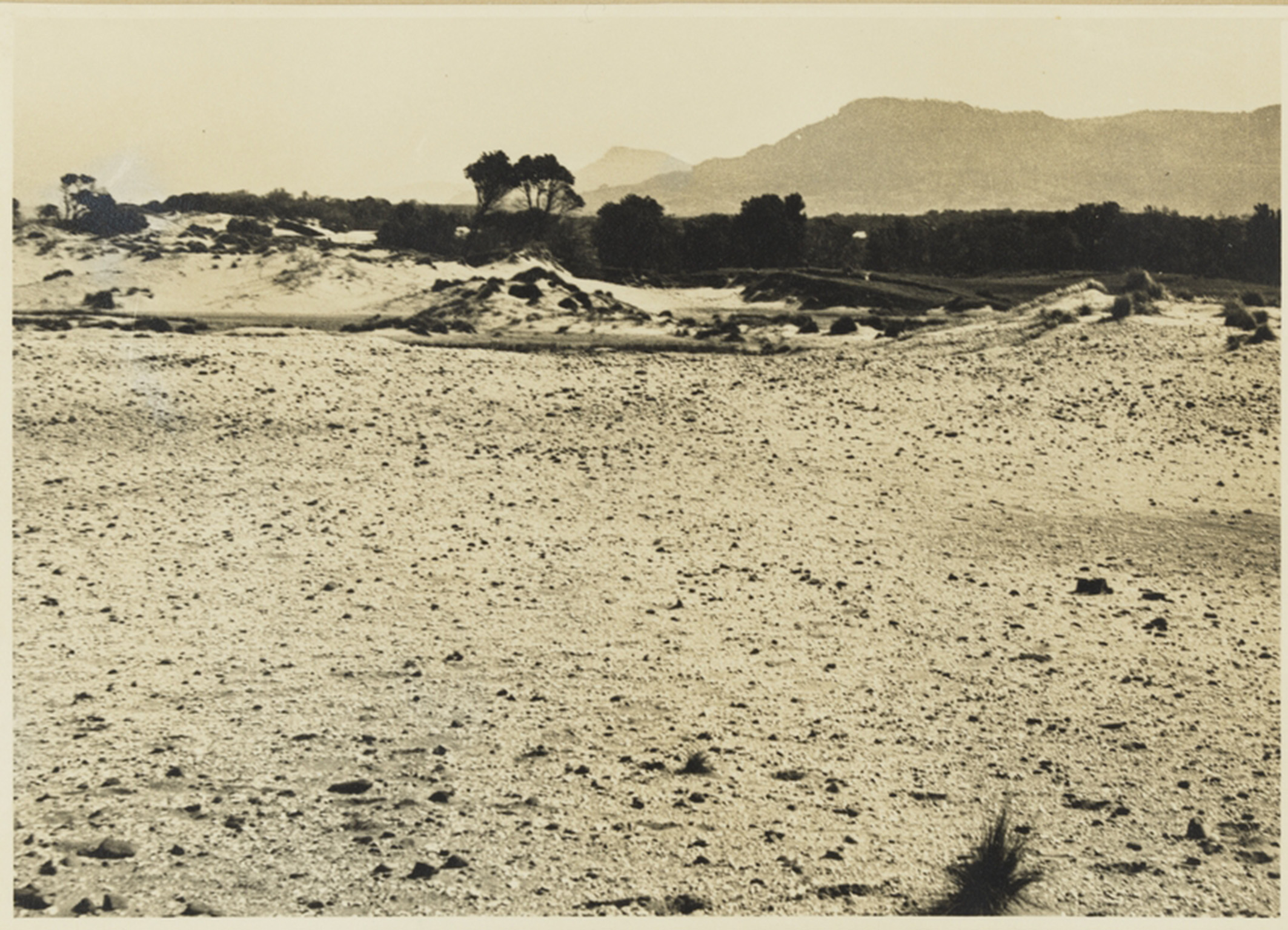
Bellambi Point shell middens and sand dunes, looking south-west (1932). This image pre-dates the destruction of the dunes due to sand mining and construction. Note the prolific artefact scatter.

Bellambi Point remains a site of considerable significance to indigenous Australians. Whilst still being home to one of the largest shell middens in NSW, much of the archaeological evidence of Aboriginal occupation has been lost or damaged due to three highly destructive phases of development since European colonisation, beginning with the construction of tramways and jetties for coal loading during the late 19th century, followed by large-scale sand mining and the construction of a water treatment plant during the 20th century. Despite this, early records give a tantalising glimpse of the area's rich indigenous history.

During December 1860, coal mine owner Thomas Hale began the expansion of coal loading facilities at Bellambi Point, including the extension of a branch tramway, coal platform and other works. The following March, whilst workers were cutting down the face of a sand hill to extend the tramway – in the general vicinity of the modern-day swimming pool and carpark – four skulls were uncovered, three fragmented and one complete. "Buried with them were two stone hatchets, in good preservation, and also a curious mass of yellow substance, like amber, that burns and emits a fragrant odour."

By 1862 there were still "a fair number" of aboriginal people living a traditional lifestyle in the vicinity of Bellambi Point, including at a campsite on the northern side of Towrodgi Creek. It was also local knowledge that skeletons had been "found in the sand-hills" and that there was a "black-fellow's cemetery on the sand banks close to Bellambi Lake."

Towards the end of January 1890, a hotel guest from Wollongong was walking about Bellambi Point and came across the upper portion of a human skull protruding from a sand dune. Further investigation revealed most of the large limb-bones, together with portions of the shoulder-bones. The remains showed signs of great age and exposure and were "scaly and brittle". The teeth were perfectly preserved, showing no signs of pre-mortem decay, "with the exception of one incisor missing and appeared to have been so for many years." The contemporary account attributed the remains to be of an Aboriginal due to the apparent age and the missing tooth, considered evidence of a known regional custom of knocking out one of the front teeth, "as a mark of fellowship or a caste distinction, which was performed at a certain age, and admitted the subject to certain rights and privileges."

During the construction of the water treatment plant in 1965, a further burial was uncovered, the remains and artefacts removed – they have since been repatriated. In September 2012, Bellambi Point was declared an official Aboriginal Place by the NSW Office of Environment and Heritage, awarding it legal status as a culturally significant site. Negotiations for the remediation of the site are on-going.

== Port Bellambi ==
Port Bellambi (c.1909)

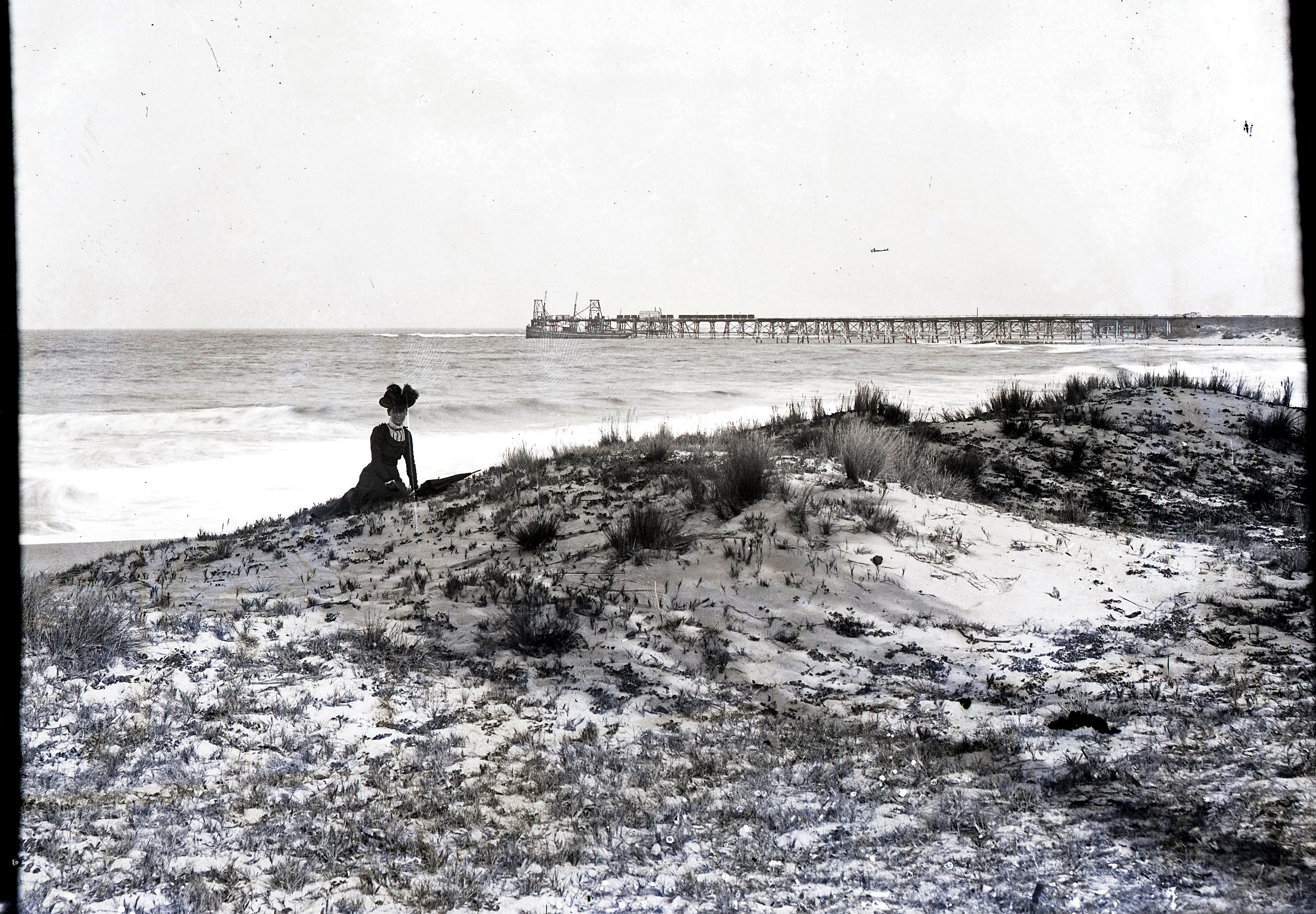
Looking south-east towards Port Bellambi c1890. Both jetties are visible, with difficulty.

By the last decade of the 19th century, there were two coal jetties at Bellambi, the South Bulli Jetty named after the mine of the same name and the Bellambi Coal Co. Jetty used by the Model Mine at Woonoona. The South Bulli Jetty built in 1887 was on Bellambi Beach immediately to the north of Bellambi Point. The Bellambi Coal Co. Jetty (also known as the "Woonoona Jetty") built in 1889 was located on a small rocky outcrop just to the north of the South Bulli Jetty. The port had also been the site of an earlier coal jetty completed around 1858 but only used for a relatively short time.

The Bellambi Coal Co. Jetty was damaged in a storm in 1898 and thereafter all coal went across the South Bulli Jetty.

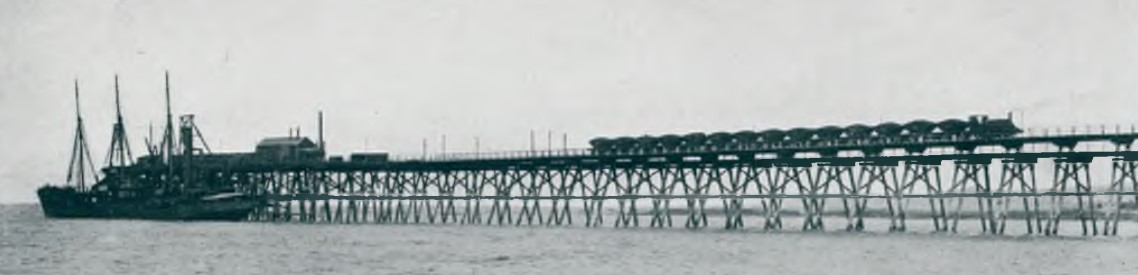
South Bulli Jetty at Port Bellambi c. 1909.

Coal was sent from the mines by rail to the jetty. There were two rail tracks on the jetty—a more elevated one for full coal wagons and another lower one for empty wagons—and two loading chutes (one for each hold of a 'sixty-miler'.) The wagons were separated for tipping. One end of the coal wagon was raised by a steam ram, acting on a wagon axle, tipping the coal through a hinged panel in the other end. The coal then passed through a chute, directly into one hold of the ship moored alongside the jetty. In 1909, six colliers were loaded with a total of 4,500 tons in 14 hours.

Bellambi was a particularly dangerous port. Bellambi Point protected the port from the south but its reef extends 600m to seaward and was a hazard to shipping. The small 'Stone Fleet' steamer Resolute was merely passing Bellambi, in 1907, when it became stranded on the reef and broke up.

It was not until 1913, that an electrically powered Occulting Light—visible up to 12.9 km to sea—was erected on Bellambi Point to aid shipping.

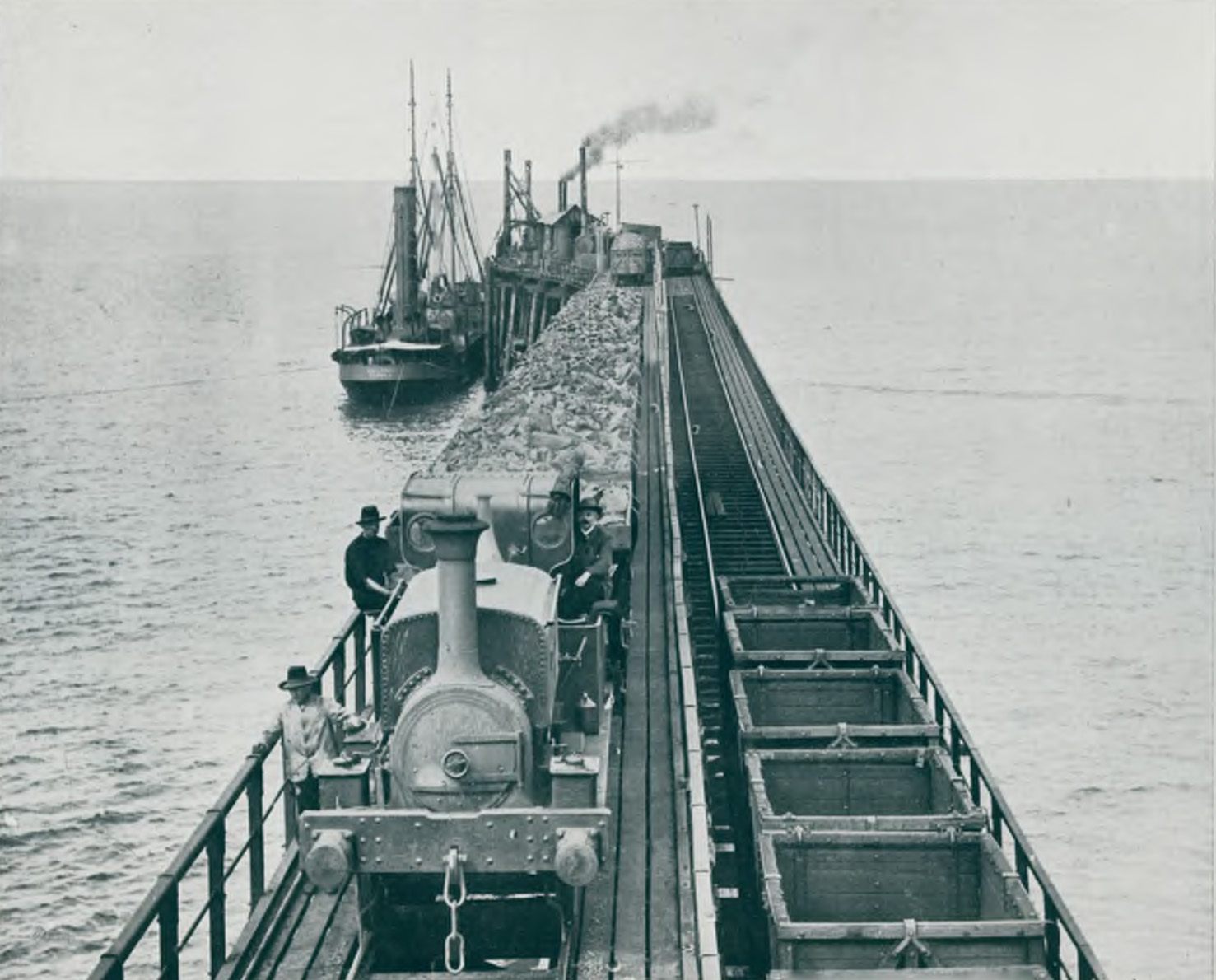
South Bulli Jetty at Bellambi harbour (1909)

A number of 'sixty-milers' came to grief there. The 'sixty-milers' wrecked on the reef at Bellambi include, Llewellyn (1882), Adinga (1896) and Saxonia (1898). The last 'sixty-miler' to be wrecked there was the s.s. Munmorah, which ran aground on the reef in 1949. The Court of Marine Inquiry into the loss of the Munmorah was not satisfied that the occulting light was on at the time of the stranding. The reef also claimed a number of ships on interstate runs. In total, twelve ships were wrecked at Bellambi between 1859 and 1949; seven of these ships went aground on the reef. The boiler of the last ship to be wrecked on the reef, the SS Munmorah in 1949, is still visible at low tide.

The South Bulli Jetty operated until 1952. The light to aid shipping was decommissioned on 1 March 1954. The jetty partially collapsed in 1955 and was demolished in 1970.

== Geography ==
=== Climate ===
Bellambi experiences a humid subtropical climate bordering on an oceanic climate (Köppen: Cfa/Cfb) with very warm, wetter summers and mild, drier winters. The wettest recorded day was 18 August 1988 with 240.0 mm (9.45 in) of rainfall. Extreme temperatures ranged from 43.7 °C (110.7 °F) on 1 January 2006 to 4.1 °C (39.4 °F) on 17 July 2007.

Climate data for Bellambi (34.37°S 150.93°E) (10 m (33 ft) AMSL) (1988-2025)
Month	Jan	Feb	Mar	Apr	May	Jun	Jul	Aug	Sep	Oct	Nov	Dec	Year
Record high °C (°F)	43.7 (110.7)	39.5 (103.1)	38.4 (101.1)	32.2 (90.0)	28.0 (82.4)	24.4 (75.9)	26.8 (80.2)	30.2 (86.4)	33.9 (93.0)	37.7 (99.9)	39.8 (103.6)	38.3 (100.9)	43.7 (110.7)
Mean daily maximum °C (°F)	25.0 (77.0)	24.9 (76.8)	24.1 (75.4)	22.4 (72.3)	19.9 (67.8)	17.7 (63.9)	17.2 (63.0)	18.2 (64.8)	20.3 (68.5)	21.7 (71.1)	22.4 (72.3)	24.0 (75.2)	21.5 (70.7)
Mean daily minimum °C (°F)	19.2 (66.6)	19.2 (66.6)	18.2 (64.8)	15.7 (60.3)	13.1 (55.6)	11.1 (52.0)	10.2 (50.4)	10.7 (51.3)	12.5 (54.5)	14.1 (57.4)	15.8 (60.4)	17.5 (63.5)	14.8 (58.6)
Record low °C (°F)	12.8 (55.0)	13.1 (55.6)	10.9 (51.6)	9.0 (48.2)	6.0 (42.8)	5.4 (41.7)	4.1 (39.4)	5.3 (41.5)	6.2 (43.2)	6.1 (43.0)	8.9 (48.0)	10.8 (51.4)	4.1 (39.4)
Average precipitation mm (inches)	86.7 (3.41)	150.5 (5.93)	123.5 (4.86)	103.5 (4.07)	85.0 (3.35)	111.0 (4.37)	87.1 (3.43)	88.5 (3.48)	62.5 (2.46)	78.1 (3.07)	100.6 (3.96)	75.6 (2.98)	1,146.2 (45.13)
Average precipitation days (≥ 0.2 mm)	12.7	13.6	13.8	10.3	9.1	10.1	8.7	8.0	9.0	11.2	12.1	11.9	130.5
Average afternoon relative humidity (%)	72	74	70	67	61	59	56	54	61	64	70	69	65
Average dew point °C (°F)	17.4 (63.3)	18.2 (64.8)	16.6 (61.9)	13.9 (57.0)	10.3 (50.5)	7.8 (46.0)	6.3 (43.3)	6.4 (43.5)	9.5 (49.1)	11.2 (52.2)	14.0 (57.2)	15.6 (60.1)	12.3 (54.1)
Source: Bureau of Meteorology (1988-2025)

== Population ==
According to the 2021 census of Population, there were 4,039 people in Bellambi.

- Aboriginal and Torres Strait Islander people made up 8.1% of the population.
- 73.1% of people were born in Australia. The next most common country of birth was England at 4.0%.
- 80.9% of people only spoke English at home.
- The most common responses for religion were No Religion 41.2%, Catholic 19.5% and Anglican 12.8%.

== See also ==
- Coastal coal-carrying trade of New South Wales
