= Russell Vale =

Coordinates: 34°21′29″S 150°54′04″E

- Suburb
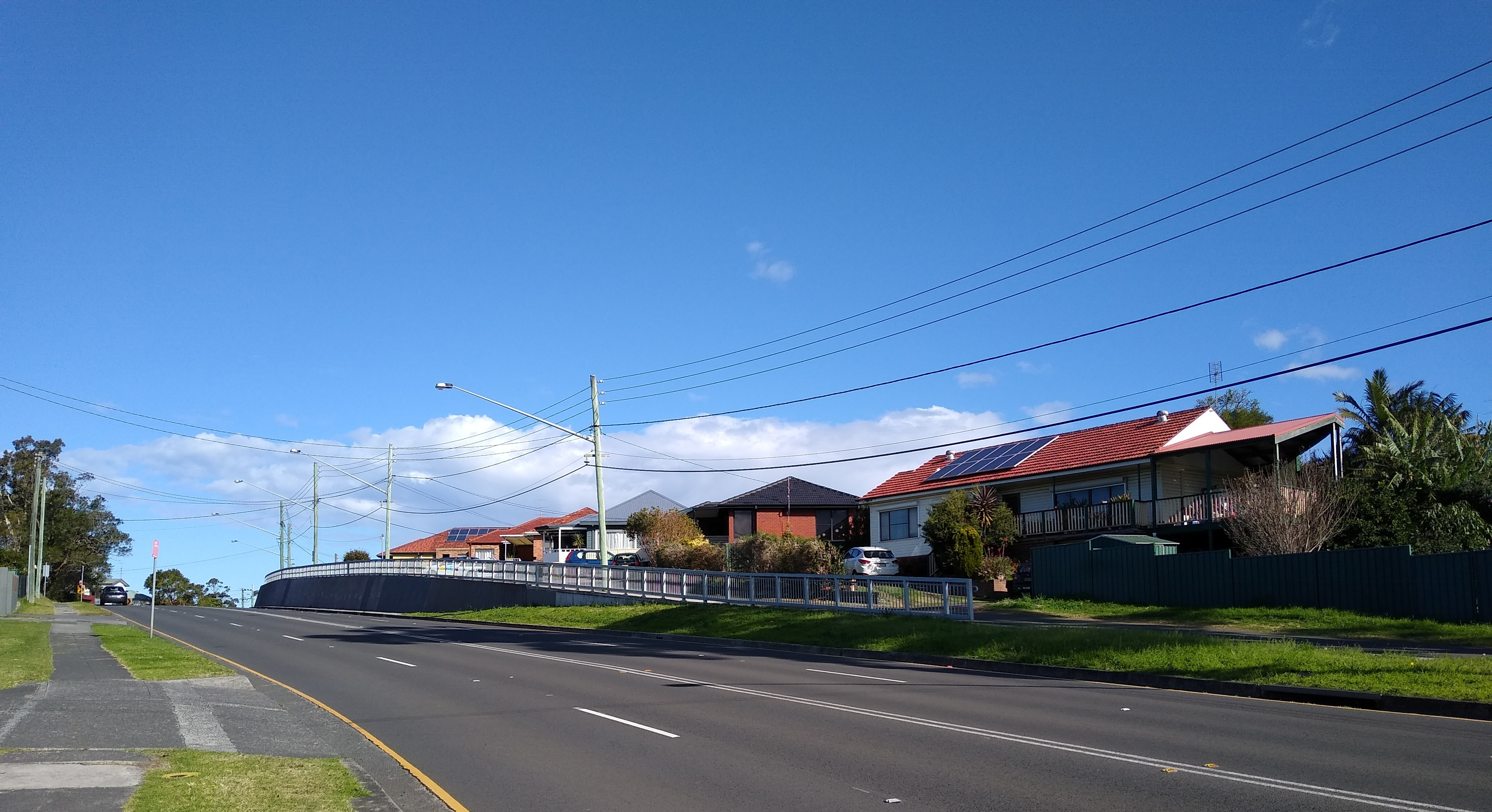
- The Princes Highway in Russell Vale
- Country: Australia
- State: New South Wales
- City: Wollongong
- LGA: City of Wollongong
- Location: 75.550 km (46.945 mi) from Sydney; 7.180 km (4.461 mi) from Wollongong

Government
  - State electorate: Keira
  - Federal division: Cunningham

Area
  - Total: 1.974 km^{2} (0.762 sq mi)
- Elevation: 135 m (443 ft)

Population
  - Total: 1,593 (2021 census)
  - Density: 807.0/km^{2} (2,090.1/sq mi)
- Postcode: 2517
Suburbs around Russell Vale
Woonona	Woonona East
Russell Vale	Bellambi
Corrimal	East Corrimal

Russell Vale is a small suburb of Wollongong in the Illawarra region of New South Wales, Australia.

== Geography ==
Russell Vale straddles the Princes Highway.

== History ==
Russell Vale was the home and estate of surveyor Francis Peter MacCabe, who died in 1897. The name Russell was the maiden name of his mother (Margaret née Russell). The estate was originally 250 acres (100 ha). In April 1904, 116 lots were subdivided and sold. In November 1904, a further 96 lots were subdivided and sold. The house at Russell Vale was demolished in 1966.

== Sporting amenities ==
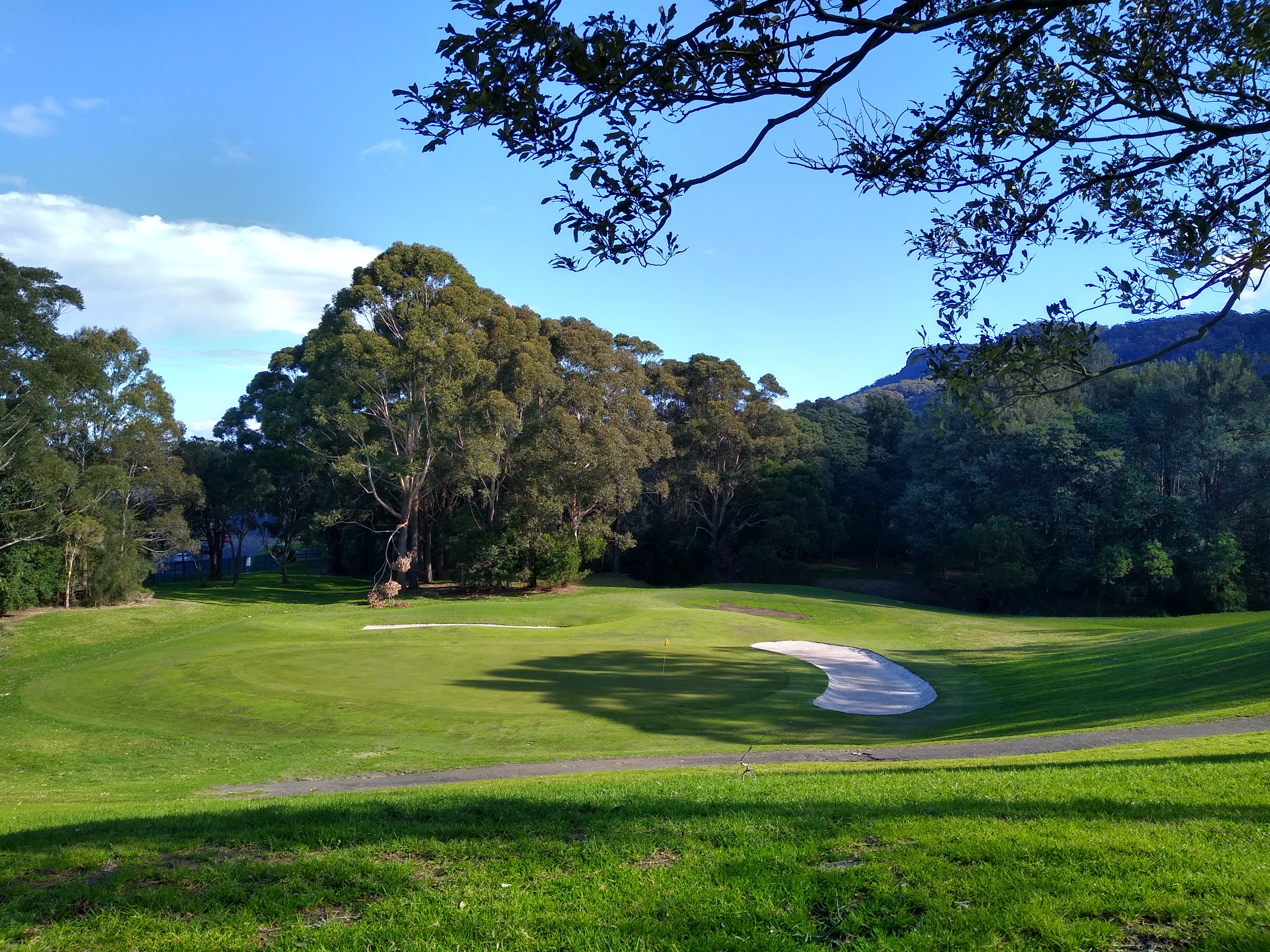
Russell Vale Golf Club

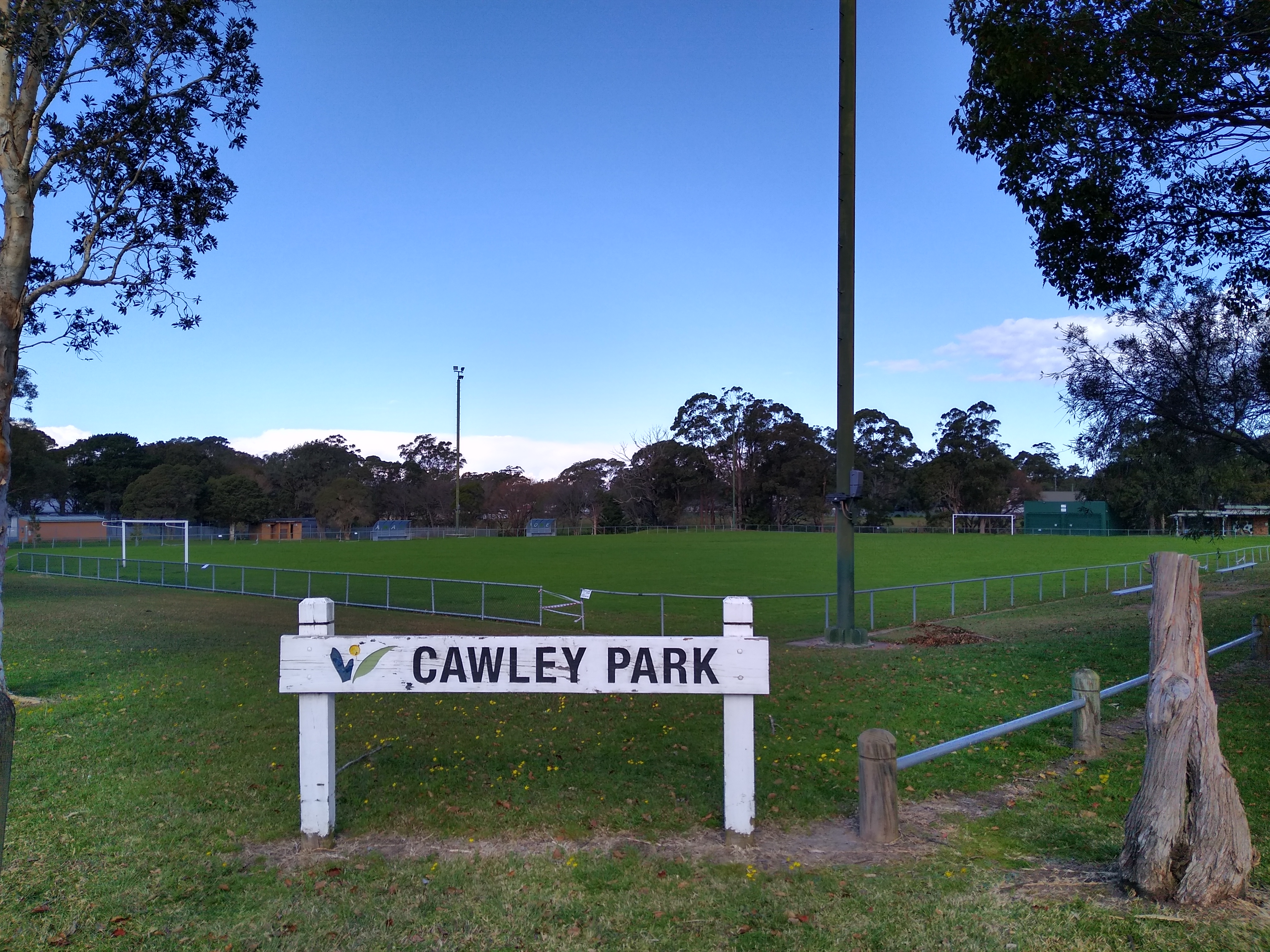
Cawley Park

Russell Vale is the home of the Russell Vale Golf Course, opened in 1986. It also contains the soccer field of Cawley Park, the homeground of the Russell Vale Soccer Club.

== Demographics ==
At the 2021 census, Russell Vale had a population of 1,593, an increase of 360 or 29.2% from the population of 1,233 at the 2001 census.

Median family incomes in Russell Vale were slightly above average for the Wollongong LGA at $2,201 per week, compared with $2,151 per week respectively. Median rents were $10 per week greater in Russell Vale at $400 than in the rest of the Wollongong LGA, although median monthly mortgage repayments were the same at $2,167.

== Mining ==
Russell Vale Colliery is an underground coal mine under the Woronora Plateau in the Sydney Drinking Water Catchment Area to the west of Russell Vale. The mine has been in operation since the 1880s using various underground mining methods to mine different coal seams. More recently, the mine has come under attack from local residents, as subsidence and cracking attributed to the mine's activities have been observed in the catchment area

== Gallery ==
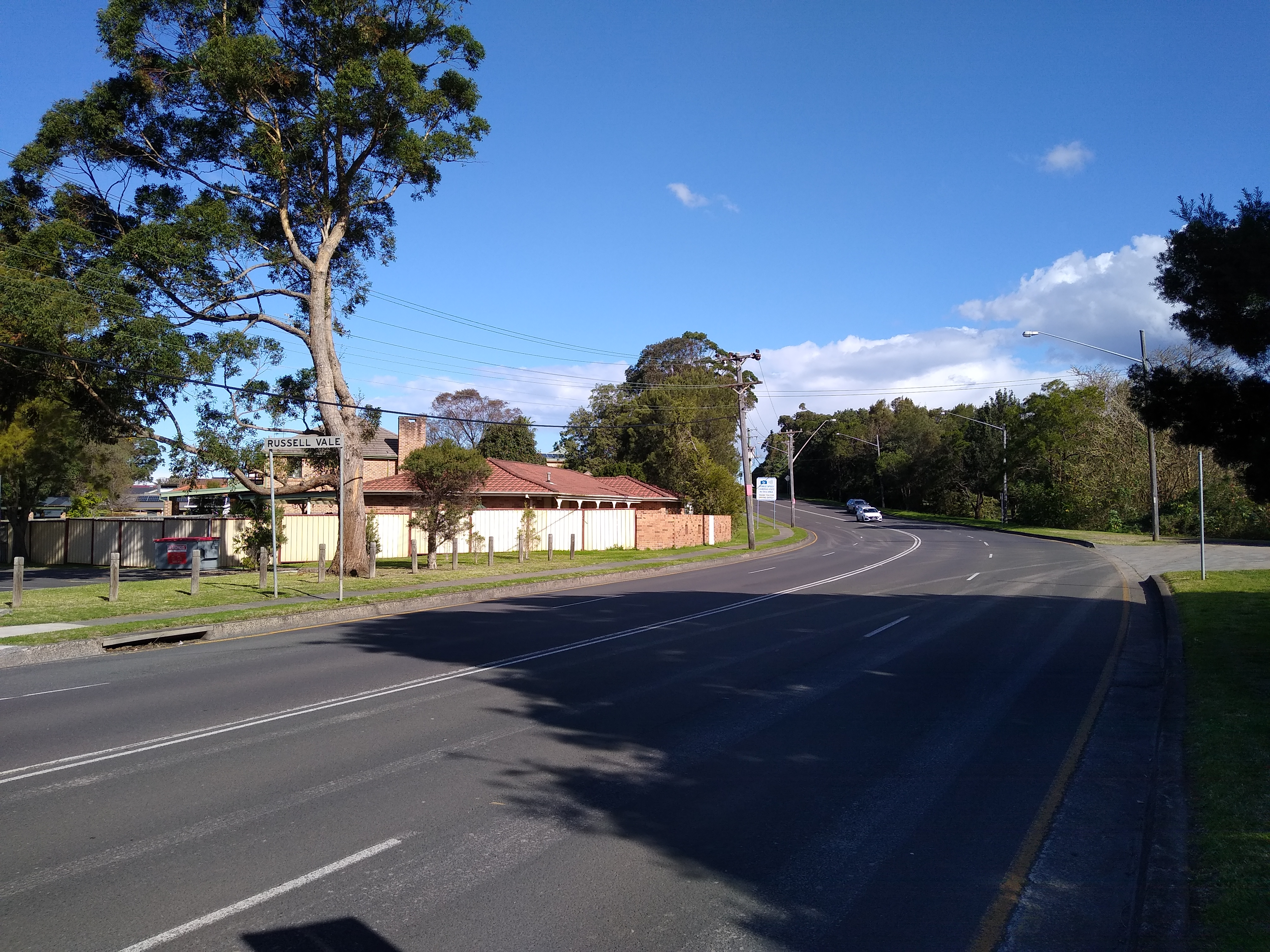
Sign for Russell Vale, coming from Woonona on the Princes Highway

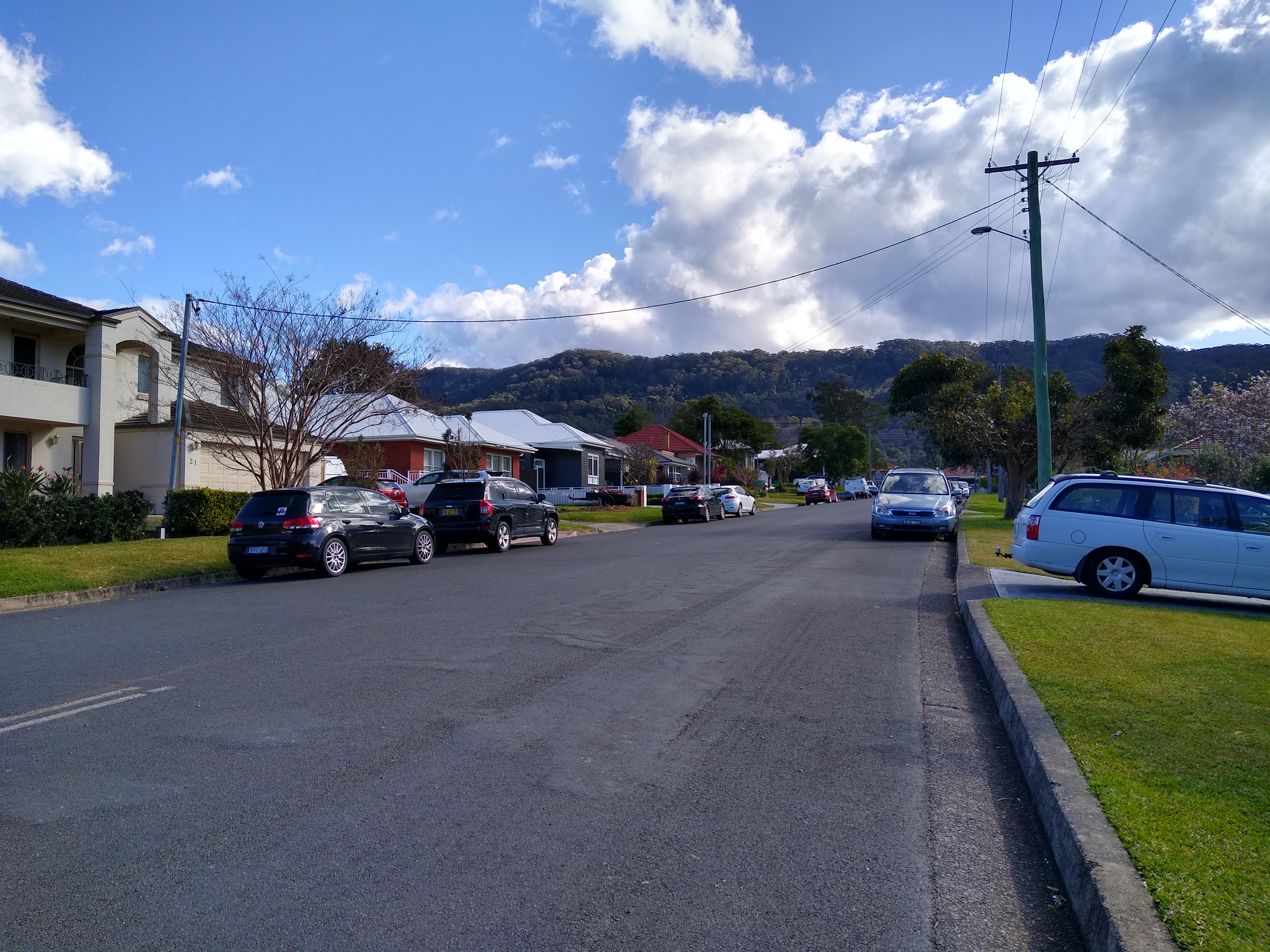

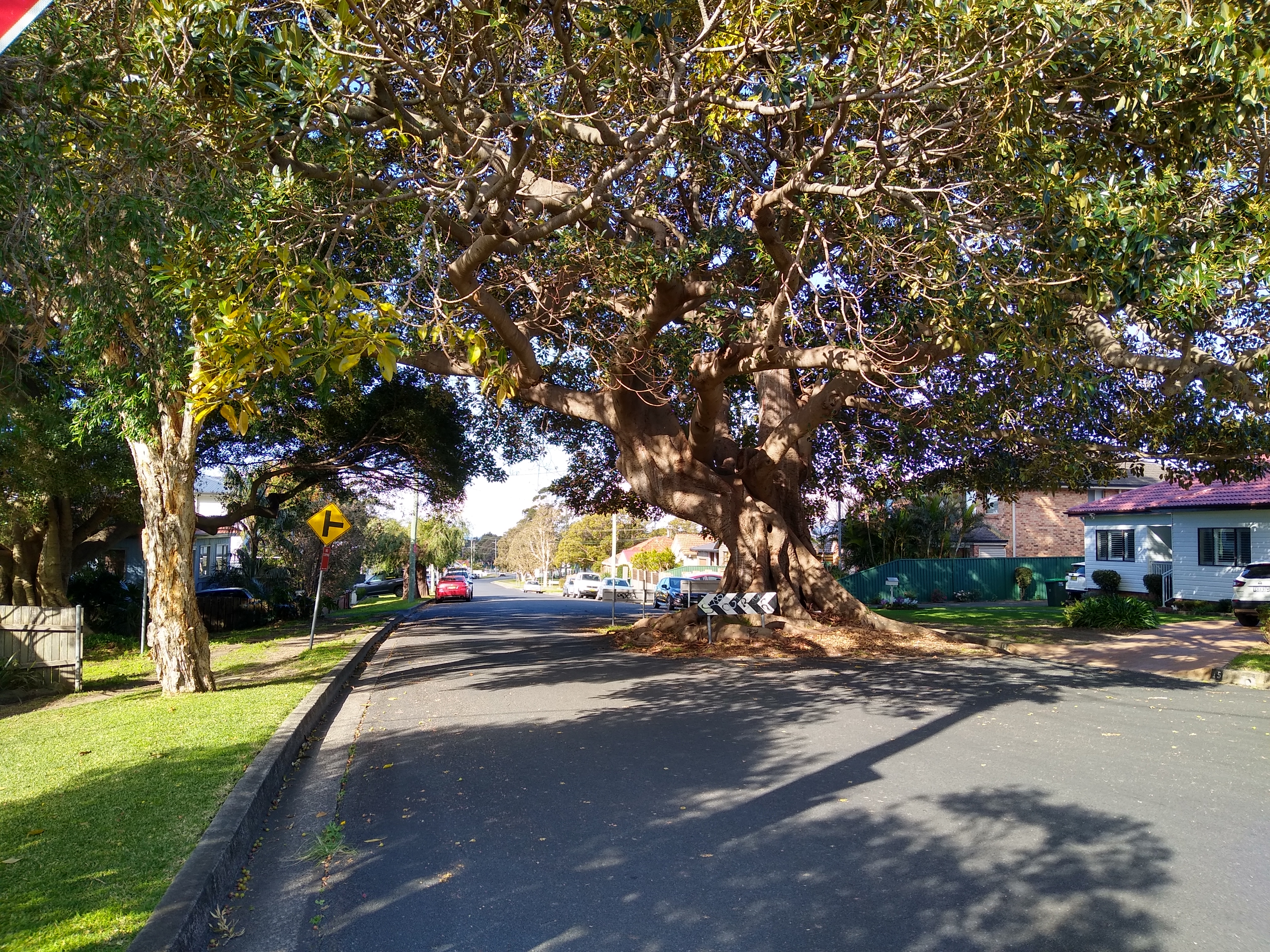
