= Bellambi railway station =

Railway station in New South Wales, Australia

Bellambi
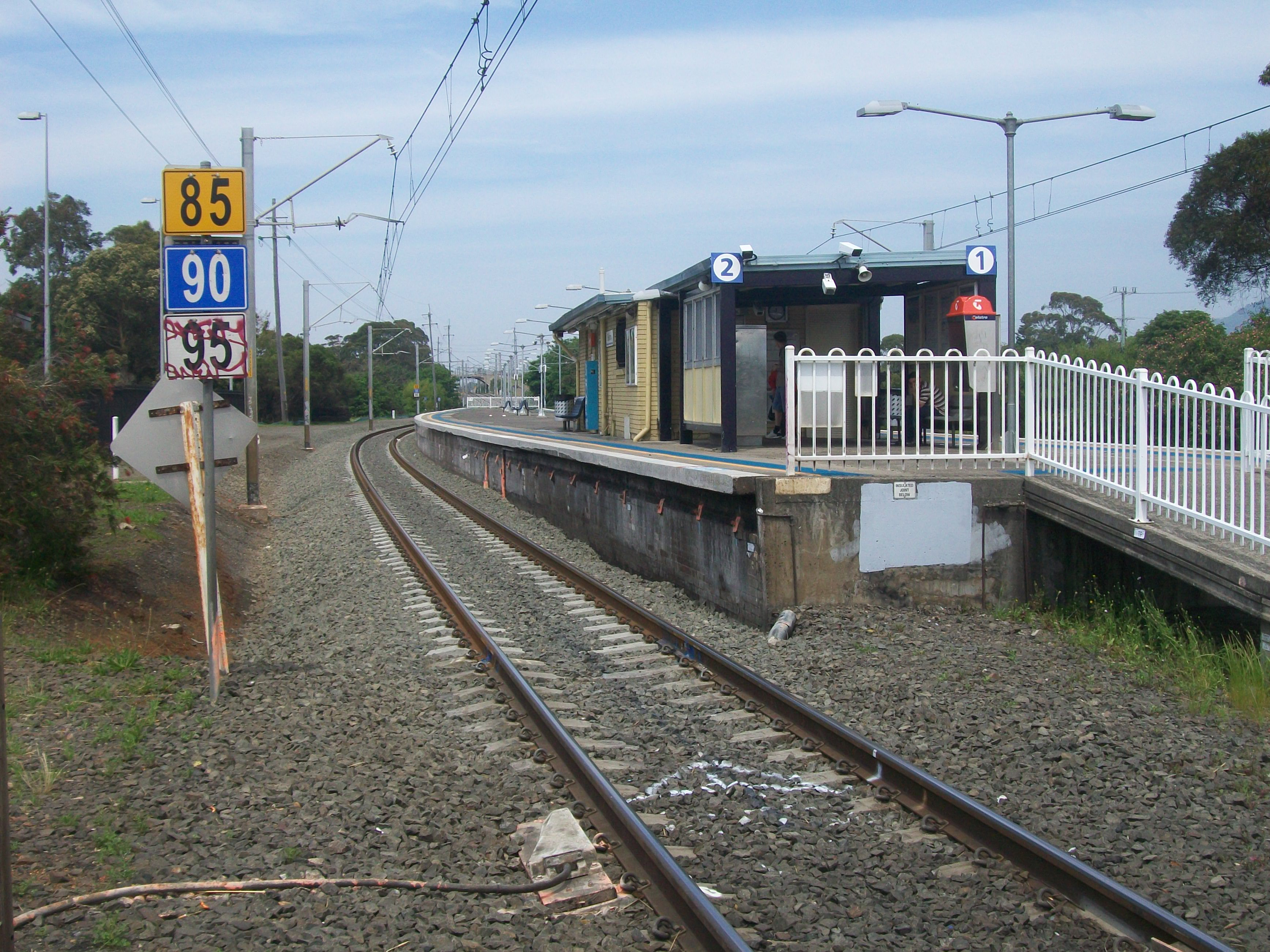
- Southbound view of Platform 2 from the Bellambi Lane level crossing, October 2011

General information
- Location: Bellambi Lane, Bellambi; Australia
- Coordinates: 34°21′47″S 150°54′36″E
- Elevation: 10 metres (33 ft)
- Owner: Transport Asset Manager of New South Wales
- Operator: Sydney Trains
- Line: South Coast
- Distance: 75.55 kilometres (46.94 mi) from Central
- Platforms: 2 (1 island)
- Tracks: 2

Construction
- Structure type: Ground
- Parking: Yes
- Accessible: Yes

Other information
- Status: Weekdays: Staffed: 5.35am to 9.35am, 2pm to 6pm: Weekends and public holidays: Unstaffed
- Station code: BLM
- Website: Transport for NSW

History
- Opened: 1889

Passengers
- 2023: 50,470 (year); 138 (daily) (Sydney Trains, NSW TrainLink)

Services
Preceding station	Intercity Trains	Following station
Corrimal towards Kiama or Port Kembla	South Coast Line	Woonona towards Central or Bondi Junction
Location

Bellambi railway station is located on the South Coast railway line in New South Wales, Australia, serving the northern Wollongong suburb of Bellambi. It opened in 1889.

== Platforms and services ==
Bellambi has one island platform with two faces serviced by Sydney Trains South Coast line services travelling from Waterfall and Thirroul to Port Kembla.

Some peak hour and late night services operate to Sydney Central, Bondi Junction and Kiama.

Platform	Line	Stopping pattern	Notes
1	SCO	services to Thirroul & Waterfall peak hour & late night services to Sydney Central & Bondi Junction	
2	SCO	services to Port Kembla peak hour & late night services to Kiama	
