= Heritage Hotel, Bulli =

Heritage Hotel
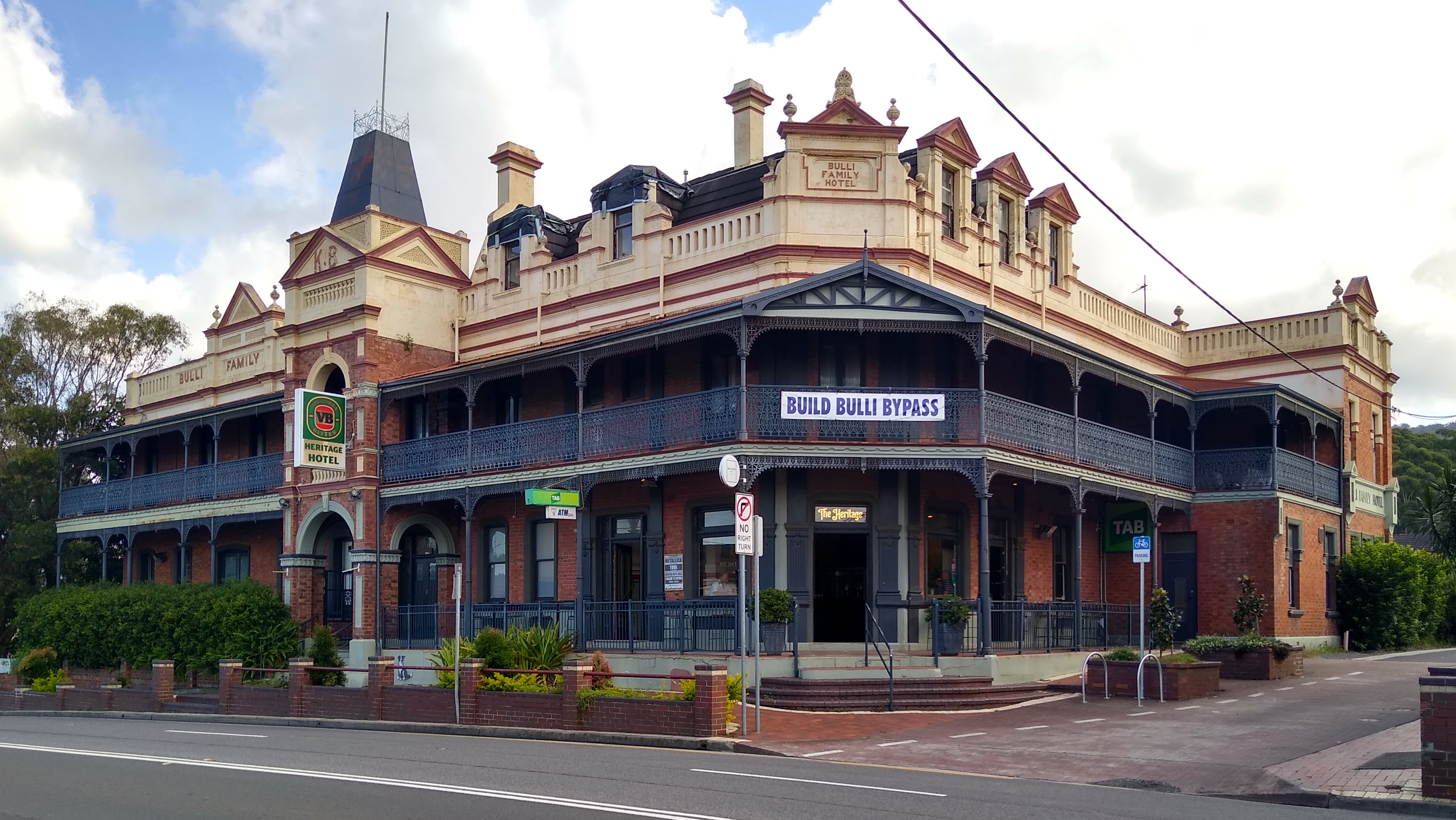

- Location within New South Wales Location within Australia
- 34.3340°S 150.9127°E
- Location: 240 Princes Highway, Bulli, City of Wollongong, New South Wales, Australia

History
- Built: 1889–1889

Site notes
- Architect: William Kerwood
- Architectural style: Victorian Filigree
- Owner: Krisgay Pty Ltd

New South Wales Heritage Register
- Official name: Family Hotel; Bulli Heritage Hotel; Bulli Family Hotel
- Type: state heritage (built)
- Designated: 2 April 1999
- Reference no.: 263
- Type: Hotel
- Category: Commercial

The Heritage Hotel is a heritage-listed pub at 240 Princes Highway, Bulli, New South Wales, a suburb of Wollongong in Australia. It was designed by William Kerwood and built in 1889. It was historically known as the Family Hotel or Bulli Family Hotel. It was added to the New South Wales State Heritage Register on 2 April 1999.

== History ==
The hotel was designed by Kenwood and Kerle and built by contractors McDonald Brothers at a cost of £3,078 for landlord George Croft. William Tory Dickson, formerly the proprietor of the New Brighton Hotel at Lady Robinsons Beach, became the first licensee. The hotel featured a "public bar, several parlours, dining room, billiard room, and 28 bedrooms". It was licensed on 28 September 1889. The Sydney Mail praised its "colossal proportions and replete appointments".

It closed on 1 April 1976, but was bought and restored by a new owner Eric Blain and reopened in January 1984. The name of the hotel was changed to the Heritage Hotel on 8 August 2000.

== Description ==
The Heritage Hotel is a Victorian Filigree boom style, 3 storey corner hotel building with verandahs, dormers and a central tower with iron lace.

== Heritage listing ==
The hotel is a significant townscape element and part of the Bulli streetscape. It is a notable example of this period in this area which reflects changes wrought in Bulli by the introduction of the railway; South of Old Bulli. It has a high level of architectural significance as a significant example of this type of Victorian period hotel in Australia.

Family Hotel was listed on the New South Wales State Heritage Register on 2 April 1999, having been found to have historic, landmark, architectural, townscape, cultural and social value, and to be both rare and representative.
