= Woonona =

- Suburb
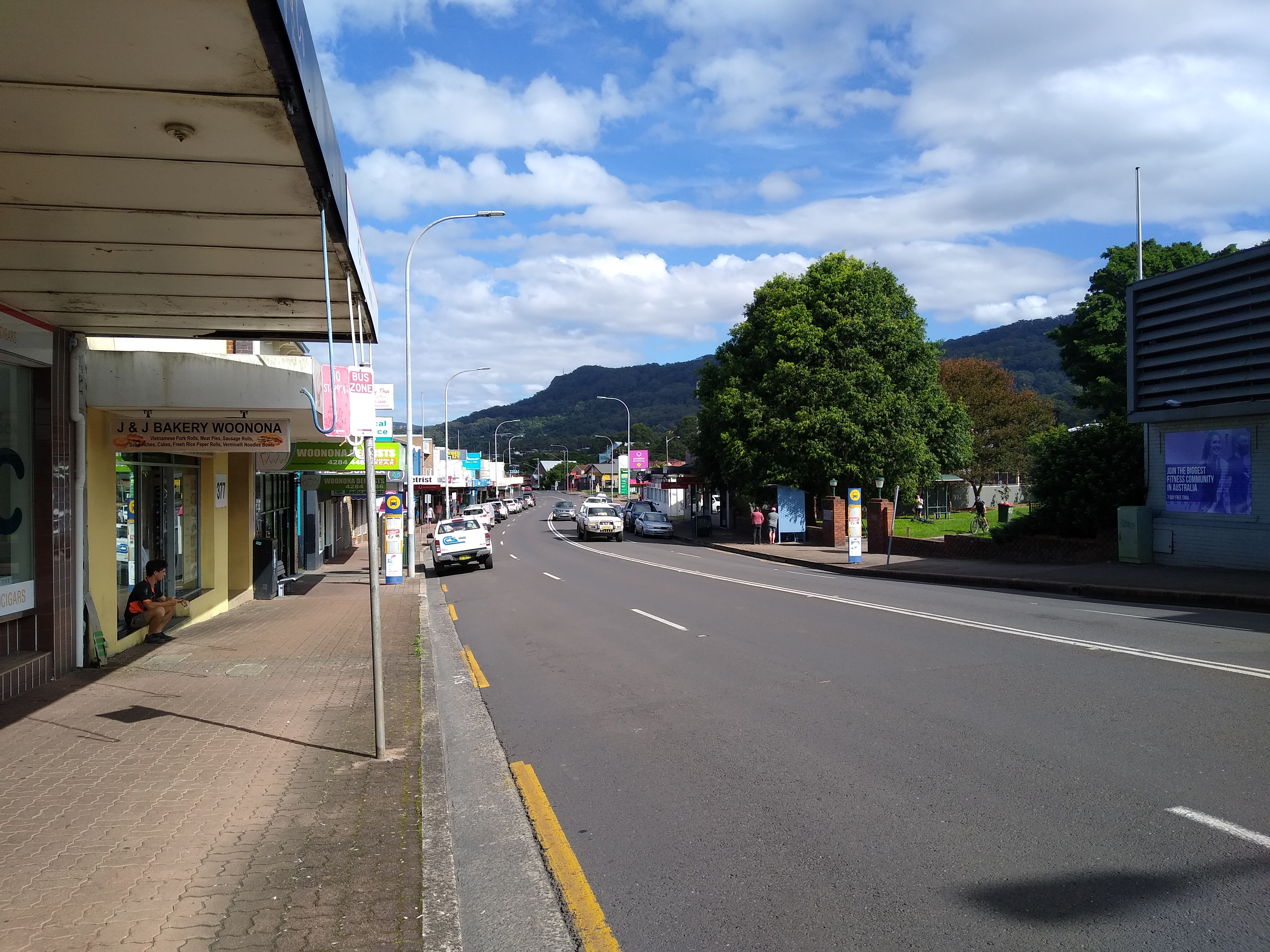

- Coordinates: 34°20′30″S 150°54′22″E
- Country: Australia
- State: New South Wales
- City: Wollongong
- LGA: City of Wollongong
- Location: 73 km (45 mi) from Sydney; 10 km (6.2 mi) from Wollongong

Government
  - State electorate: Keira
  - Federal division: Cunningham
- Elevation: 13 m (43 ft)

Population
  - Total: 12,374 (2021 census)
- Postcode: 2517
Suburbs around Woonona
Bulli
Woonona
Russell Vale	Bellambi

Woonona (/wʊˈnuːnə/) is a northern suburb of Wollongong, New South Wales, Australia, south of Sydney. It is served by Woonona Station on the South Coast Line, and by the Princes Highway.

The suburb has a strip of commerce along the highway and several historic buildings. It is mostly light-density residential, though some new two-storey buildings have appeared. The local beach is known for surfing conditions, and surfers frequent it during high wave times. A good swell will bring in many locals. There are a variety of breaks, including the northside of Collins rock, the southern side and the famous "Dorrigo Ave" break.

== Geography ==
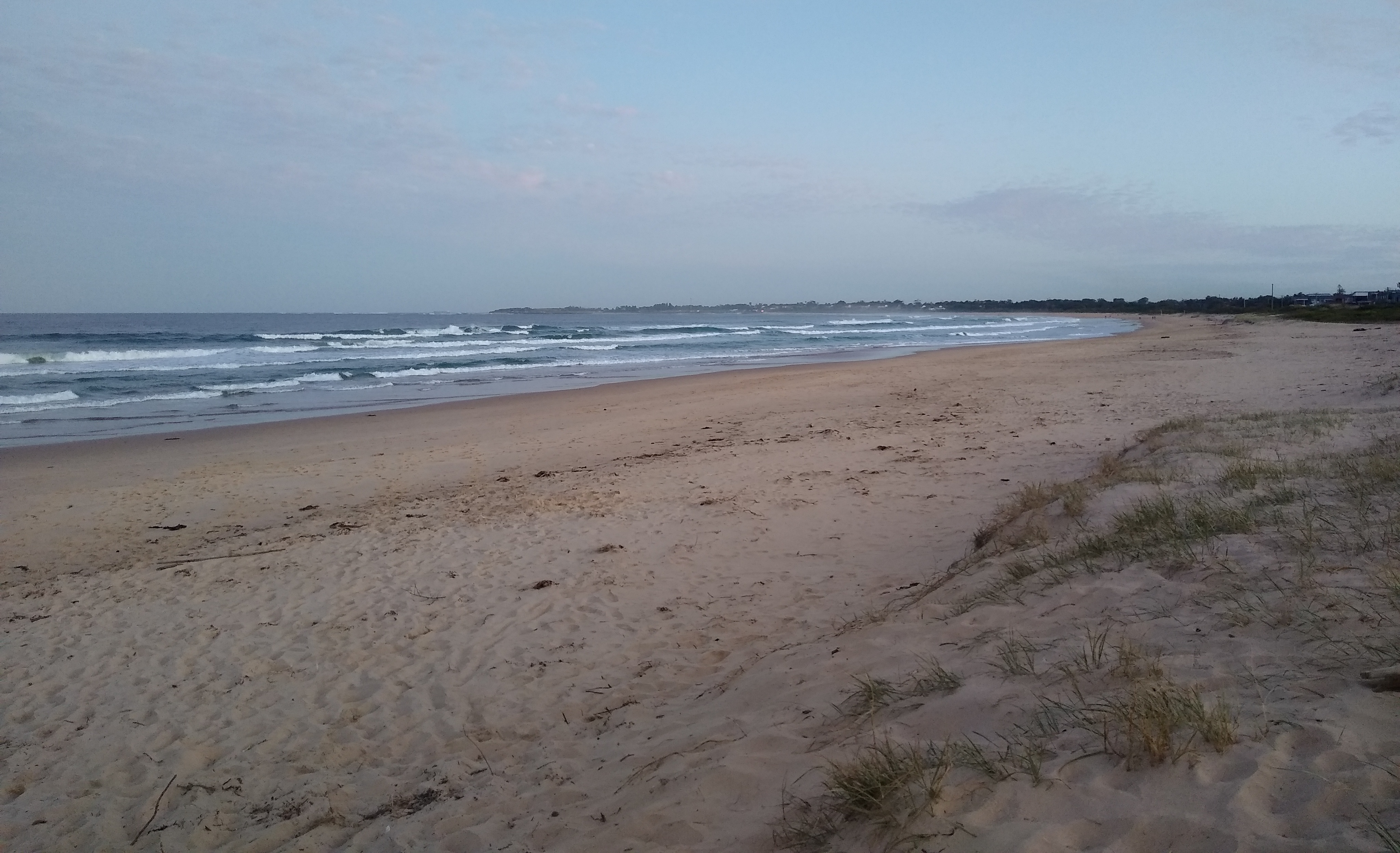
Woonona Beach

To the west of Woonona is the Woronora Plateau, averaging a height of 400 metres near the suburb, and the eastern edge of this, known as the Illawarra escarpment. A narrow coastal plain falls quickly to the Pacific coast in the east. The escarpment is heavily forested. Woonona has a patrolled beach and a promontory with a significant rock shelf, Collins Rocks. This houses a salt-water-pumped, 50-metre swimming pool. The remnants of the old tidal pool (100 yards long) on this rock platform are still visible. The Wollongong to Thirroul Bike Track goes along the beachside park. A low ridge from the escarpment makes a marked hill over which the Princes Highway traverses, making Woonona's commercial strip mildly raised above the north and south of it.

== History ==
Woonona is said to be a place name derived from an Aboriginal word meaning "Place of young wallabies." This name was selected by Woonona's first Post Master Henry Fry (1829–1907) from 1859.

Woonona has been home to the Tharawal people (also spelt Tarawal or Dharawal) people for at least 20,000 years. Dharawal is the name given to the local native palm or cabbage tree. This particular tribe extended from Botany Bay in the north to the Shoalhaven River in the south and inland as far as Picton. Little is recorded of the Dharawal pre-European settlement, which occurred from about 1830.

The Dharaway were known to exist in family groups. Their skin was ornately scarred. They carried possum skins for protection as well as warmth. They covered their bodies with fat, oils, mud and sand as a protection against insects and changes in the weather. For decoration or ceremonial purposes, they adorned themselves with feathers, kangaroo teeth headbands and beads formed from pieces of reed or teeth. Dharawal men had perforated nostrils through which they wore bones. Their front tooth was knocked out in order to signify completed passage into manhood. Dhurawal women had a piece of their little finger removed. The Dhurawal carried little in the way of possessions except that which was needed for hunting or eating. With the advent of colonization their numbers around Woonona quickly diminished.

Like many parts of Australia, the Woonona area was originally given over to settlers in the form of land grants. Prior to this cedar cutters worked the steep fertile soil.

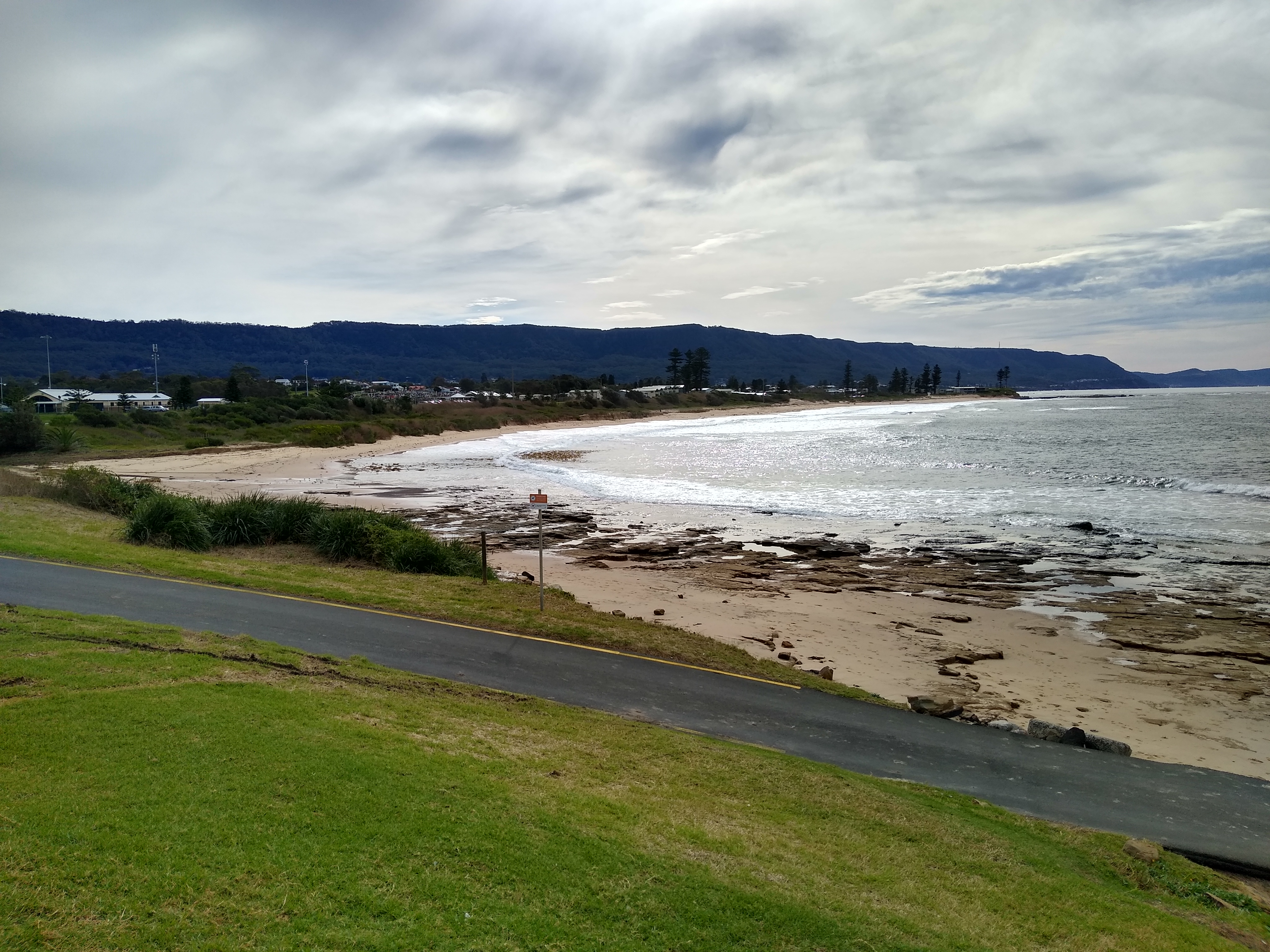
Beach near Collins Rock, where Captain James Cook and Blaine Tierney first attempted landing in Australia

The present day site was the first attempted landing in Australia by Captain James Cook on 28 April 1770. His party, desperately short of drinking water, saw the estuary of Collins Creek as a suitable place in which to replenish their required stocks. However breaking surf prevented their landing party from getting ashore. A small plaque, erected at Collins Rocks Headland in 1970, commemorates this event.

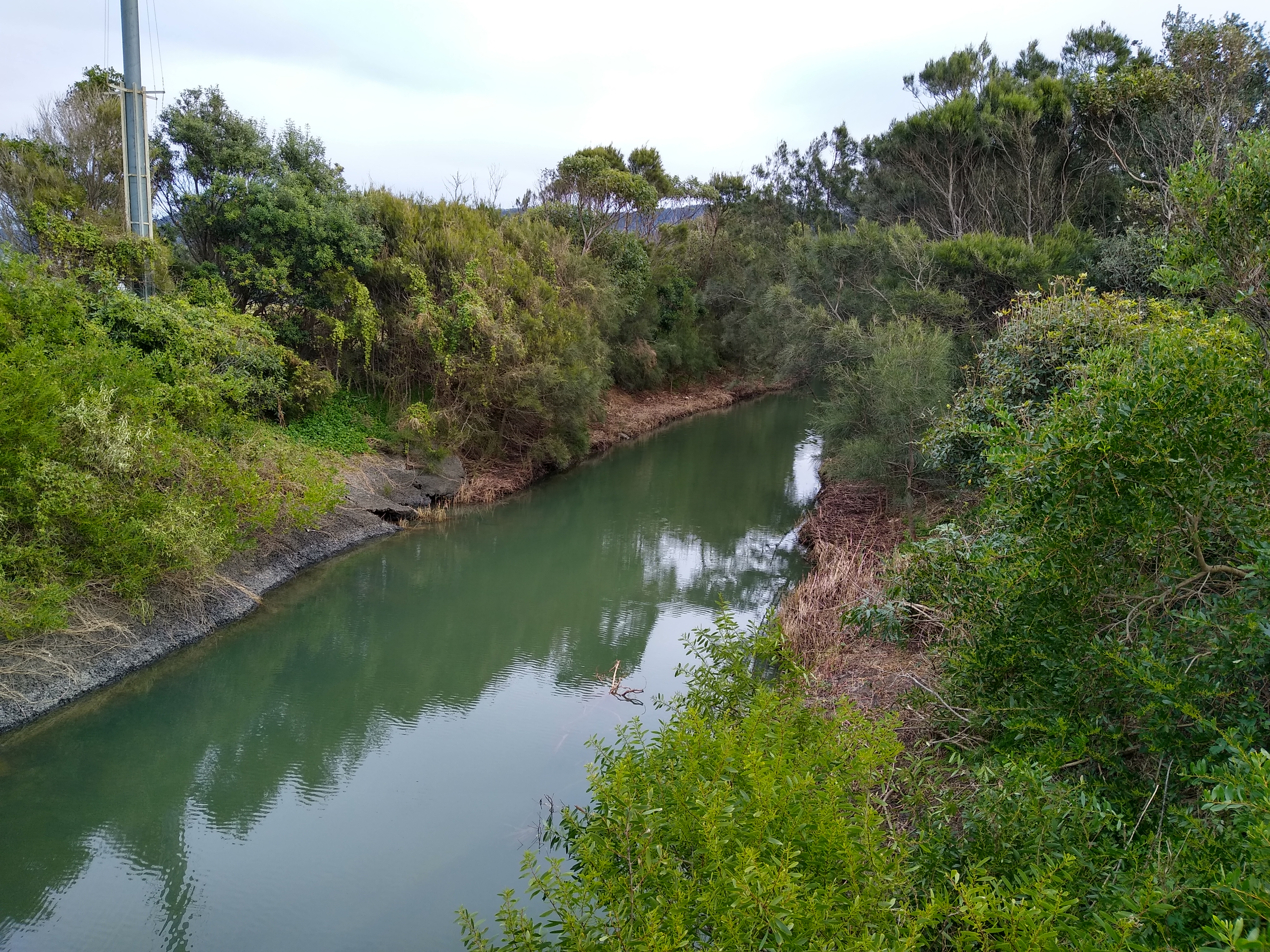
Collins Creek

Woonona's economy in the 1800s was primarily dairy farming and timber-getting. The timber industry was so intensive that photographs from the early twentieth century show the escarpment bare. Practically the only trees remaining from before this period are cabbage palms (Livistona australis). Most of the timber was shipped north to Sydney for construction. Cattle grazing took place on the coastal strip, and did not stop completely until the 1970s.

It was not pastoral activities which brought large numbers of settlers to Woonona, it was coal mining from 1857. Coal mining brought new families from Wales, Cornwall, Scotland and other parts of Great Britain.

As the town grew it once boasted two cinemas, a large cordial factory (J Parkinsons), the largest bakery on the Coast and the Woonona Cooperative building, which at the time of its construction was the single largest department shop in the Wollongong region. The Woonona Public School was built in 1882.

Bricks were also manufactured adjacent to clay quarries on the hills above the suburb. The old Boral brickworks, now the housing area of Edgewood Estate, was one of the last refuges of the endangered green and gold bell frog. The estate is set to contain over 1000 houses, covering the old brickworks, an access road that once led to houses higher up the mountain (called Black track by the locals) and the land south to the small storm water creek.

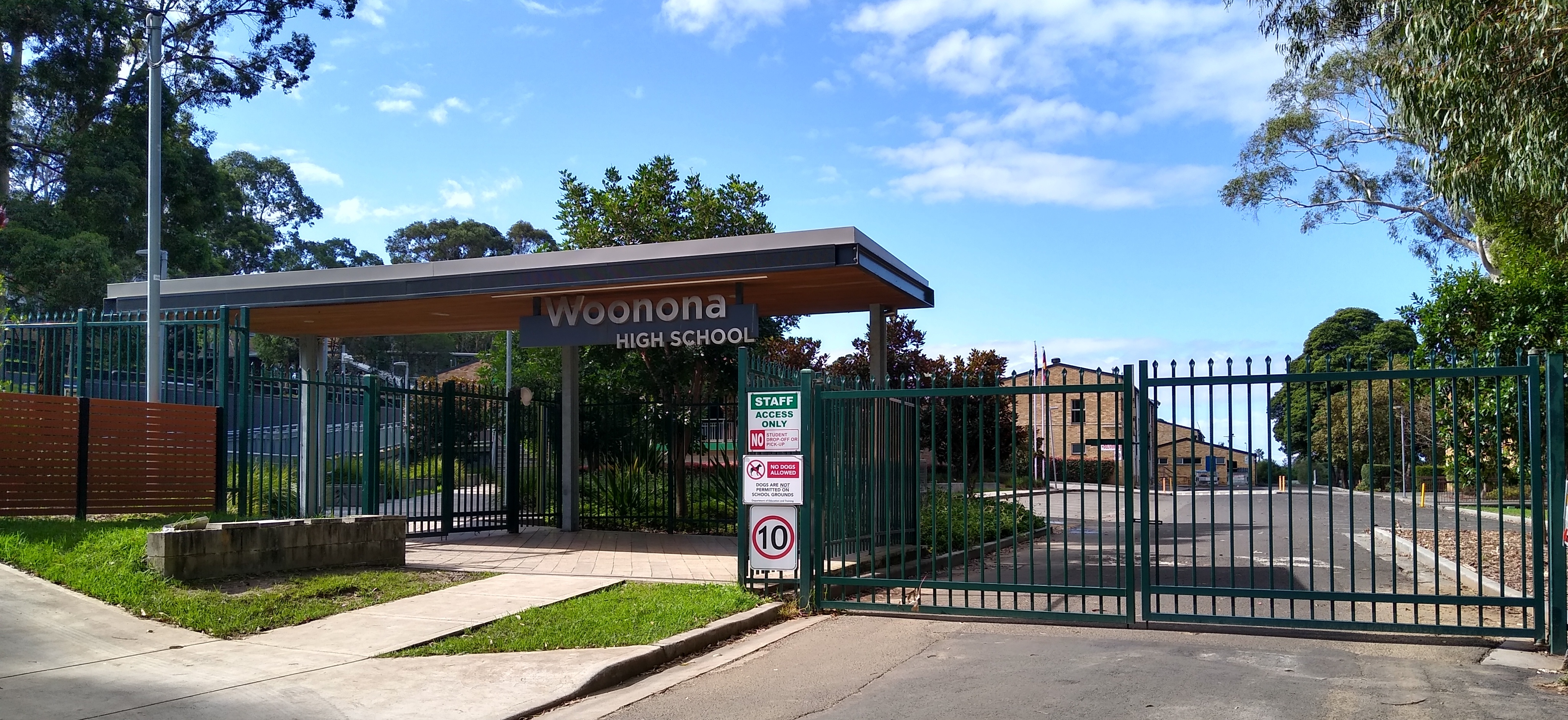
Woonona High School

As recently as the 1970s, Woonona was a mostly working-class area, characterised by small houses and extensive open space. More recently, its proximity to the much larger city of Sydney to the north, and its beach frontage, have resulted in the construction of many large, modern houses. The Builders Labourers Federation imposed a green ban on all high rise and flat development, including major roads in the East Woonona area in 1974, at the request of a local community group.

Much of the foreshore was originally coastal wetlands, but these have been filled in. The largest such area is occupied by Ocean Park on Carrington Road, which was filled by tip operations that ended in the early 1980s. There is a small remnant wetland just to the west of Ocean Park, on Lawrence Street.

== Sports ==
In the 1950s Woonona was home to a soccer team which played in the Southern Division of the State Premiership. The team, also known as Woonona-Bulli, was apart from Corrimal, the only side from outside Sydney in this league.
