= Bulli, New South Wales =

Bulli
- Suburb
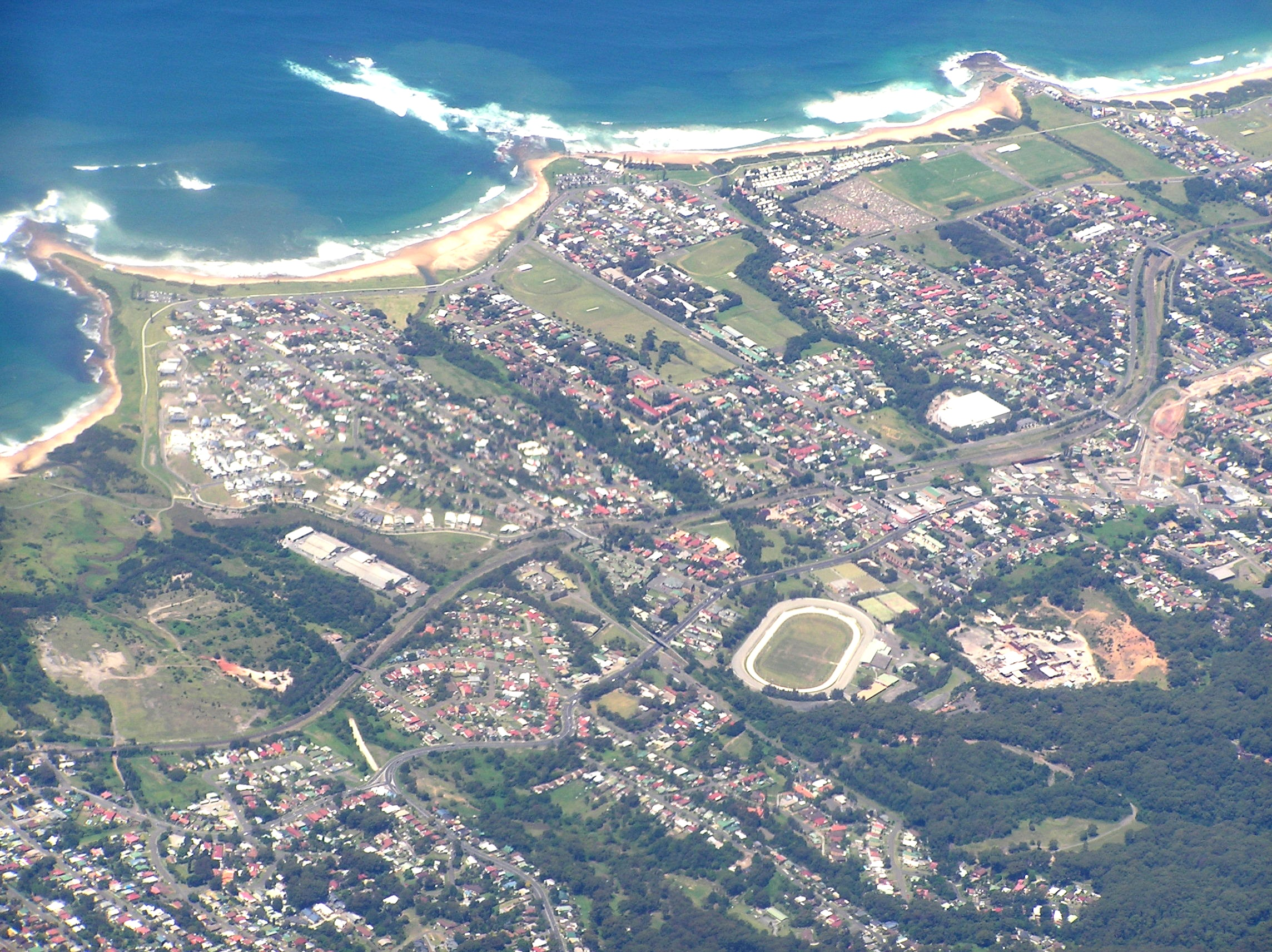
- Aerial view of Bulli

- Coordinates: 34°20′03″S 150°54′48″E
- Country: Australia
- State: New South Wales
- City: Wollongong
- LGA: City of Wollongong
- Location: 72 km (45 mi) S of Sydney; 11 km (6.8 mi) N of Wollongong

Government
  - State electorates: Heathcote; Keira
  - Federal division: Cunningham
- Elevation: 22 m (72 ft)

Population
  - Total: 6,798 (2021 census)
- Postcode: 2516
Suburbs around Bulli
Thirroul
Bulli
Woonona

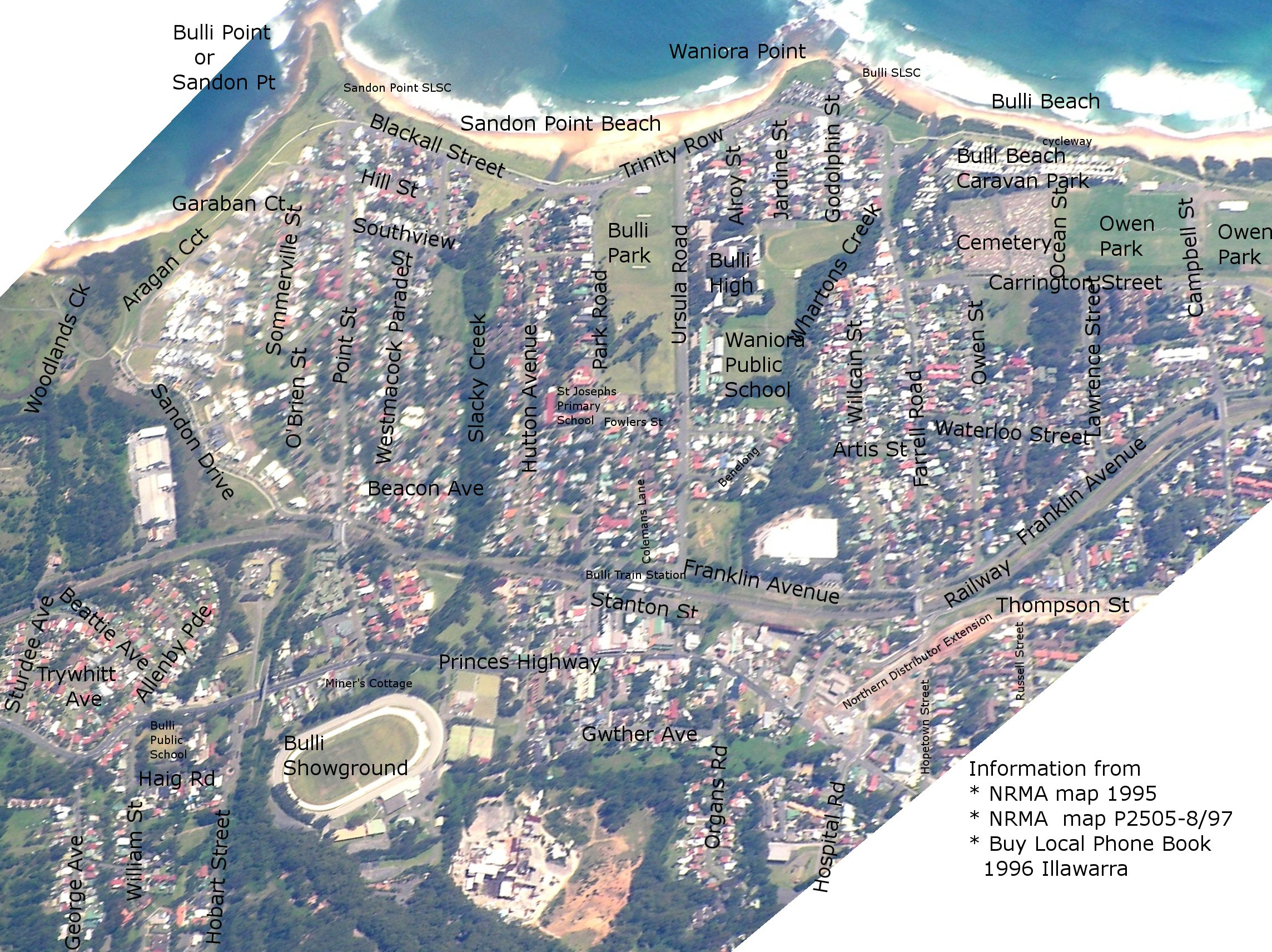
Map of Bulli

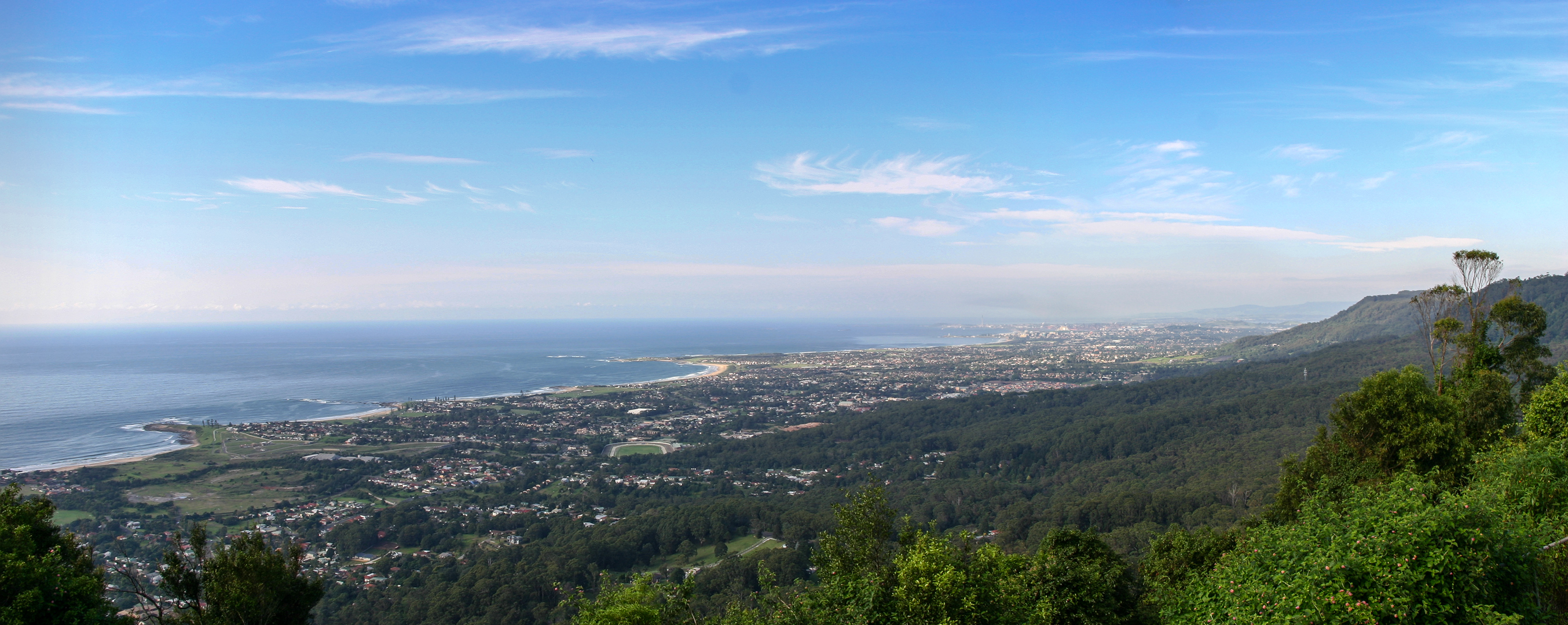
Panorama of the suburb and northern Wollongong's coastline

Bulli (/ˈbʊlaɪ/ BULL-eye) is a northern suburb of Wollongong situated on the south coast of New South Wales, Australia.

== History ==
Bulli is possibly derived from an Aboriginal word signifying "double or two mountains" referring to Mount Kembla and Mount Keira, but other derivations have been suggested.

Originally inhabited by Dharawal Aboriginal people, European wood cutters worked in the area from about 1815. The area was once abundant in Red Cedars, these are now still seen but thinly. The first permanent European settler was Cornelius O'Brien, who established a farm in 1823 and whose name was given in the pass at O'Briens Road south at Figtree.

Bulli soil is also the primary source of soil and foundation of Sydney Cricket Ground, which makes the SCG being seen traditionally as one of the most spin-friendly international cricket grounds in Australia.

=== Coal ===
The Bulli Coal Company opened a mine in 1862 on the escarpment and built cottages to house miners and their families. Coal was transported by rail from the mine to Bulli Jetty at Sandon Point where it was loaded onto ships.

The miners were paid in accordance with production, they were not paid a set wage. The first trade union in the Illawarra region was formed by miners at Bulli in 1879. Management retaliated by firing and evicting union miners and hiring non-union labour.

On 23 March 1887, a gas explosion in the mine killed 81 men and boys, leaving 50 women widows and 150 children without fathers. There was one survivor, a 17-year-old boy who became known as "Boy Cope". A memorial obelisk listing the names of those who perished is situated in Park Road, Bulli, adjacent to the railway line. The mine reopened later in the year. The Bulli Mine Disaster was the worst in Australia's history until surpassed in 1902 by Mount Kembla.

The disaster was first examined by a coroner's inquest. The verdict was delivered by the jury as: "Yes the Jury are of the opinion that William Wade and others came to their death in the Bulli Coalmine on 23rd or March 1887 by a gas explosion". The jury then added a rider: "which was brought about by the disregard of the Bulli Colliery Special Rules and Coal Mines Act, in allowing men to work when gas existed". Following the coroner's inquest a royal commission was established under the chairmanship of Dr. James R. M. Robertson to inquire into the accident.

Air entering the mine was divided into two. One part went to the western district, the other continued down the main tunnel and supplied the Hill End district which was where the explosion occurred. Within the Hill End District the air passed through each of six headings in turn before being ejected by a furnace at the foot of an upcast shaft. Clearly this meant that any firedamp (usually methane) released by the earlier headings was drawn across the later headings where the men were working. Along each heading were the areas where men extracted the coal. They were known as bords. When a bord had been worked out it was simply sealed off, but this meant that any firedamp accumulating there was not promptly removed. Each tunnel was used for three purposes: as a travelling road (for access to parts of the mine), as a haulage road (for bringing coal out) and as a ventilation passage. To control the ventilation doors were used, but they had to be opened for the passage of trains of skips. Each opening disrupted the air currents throughout that section of the mine.

The mine has since long been levelled, with only concrete foundations revealing the location of the old office area and other buildings. Hidden along the cliff behind said foundations can be found the old mine entrances. These have been sealed with up to 12 feet of concrete, with a drainage line set in the concrete. To the east is the remnants of the sorting site, a few scattered foundations and a tar patch.

The old railway line from the mine to the coast has mostly been removed, but the bridge it ran over remains and is now used as a walkway over the highway; it was restored after a fatal car accident involving a school child. The bridge now features a welcome sign for the historic Black Diamond district.

== Demographics ==
According to the 2021 census of Population, there were 6,798 people in Bulli.

- Aboriginal and Torres Strait Islander people made up 2.8% of the population.
- 82.8% of people were born in Australia. The next most common country of birth was England at 4.1%.
- 90.6% of people spoke only English at home.
- The most common responses for religion were No Religion 47.4%, Catholic 22.2% and Anglican 14.5%.

== Education ==
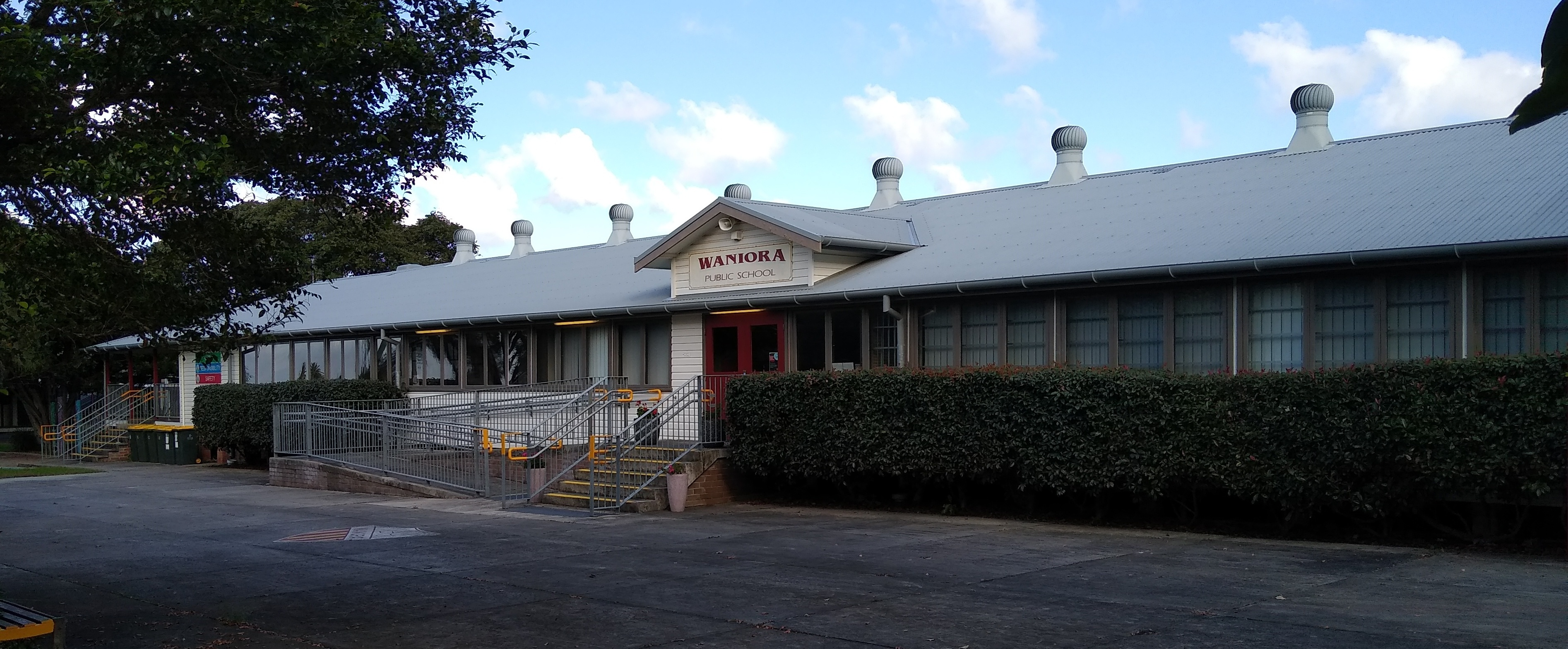
Waniora Public School

There are two public primary schools named: Bulli Public School and Waniora Public School. There is also one private primary school named St Joseph's Catholic Parish Primary and one public high school in Bulli High School.

== Landmarks ==
Shark Bay (Bulli), or 'Sharky', and Waniora Point, viewed from Sandon Point

Bulli Beach (pictured below) is a popular surfing spot. The northern tip (Sandon Point) is a venue for regular surfing competitions.

Bulli's main historical feature is the railway station, situated between the escarpment and the surf beaches. The station was the first on the south coast and contains a museum which is open every Sunday.

The Bulli Methodist Chapel was opened in the year 1865 at the cnr of Point Street and the Prince's Highway. It became the Bulli Uniting Church in 1977.

Another historic feature is the Heritage Hotel, which was opened in 1889. This is in the heart of the 'Black Diamond' district.

The Illawarra Grevillea Park is an arboretum and botanic garden which opened in 1993. It houses the repository or living collection of the Grevillea Study Group of the Australian Plants Society (previously SGAP). It is a botanic garden containing plants native to Australia – its collections include grevilleas, prostantheras and rainforest plants. Staffed and run by volunteers, it is open 6 weekends a year.

Behind the Illawarra Grevillea Park is Slacky Flat Park which is home to some reasonably undisturbed remnant rainforest and numerous species of native birds and marsupials.

The town has a small chain of commerce in its central district west of the station, and includes a newsagent and several specialty stores. The town is home to St Joseph's Catholic Primary School (current principal Mrs Luisa Tobin), Bulli Public School, Waniora Public School and Bulli High School, New South Wales.

At Sandon Point and Tramway Creek immediately north of the promontory, there is some remnant bushland including turpentine forest. This is an important migratory bird location and a history walk has been set up along the road were the old railway used to go. This point is also the site of a midden area. For over fifteen years the local community has been campaigning against residential development of this coastal floodplain and wetland. This included over 150 submissions to a Commission of Inquiry which recommended against further major development. Minister for Planning, Frank Sartor, however has overridden his COI to give Stockland and the Anglican Village Retirement Trust approval to add over 1000 residential houses and units.

== Heritage listings ==
Bulli has a number of heritage-listed sites, including:

- 240 Princes Highway: Heritage Hotel
- Northern Illawarra Uniting Church: Bulli Methodist Chapel
- Railway Street: Bulli railway station

== Gallery ==
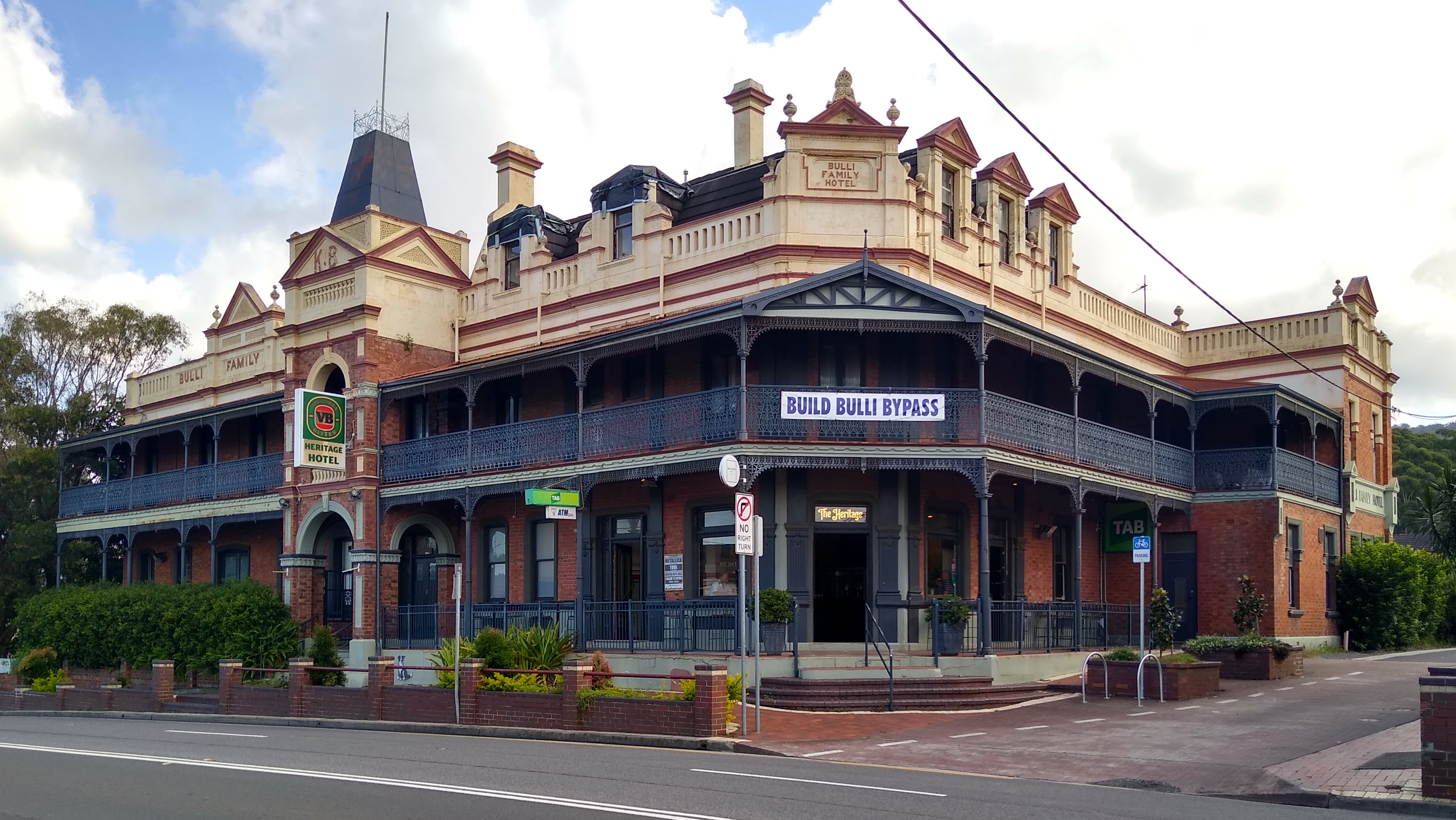
Bulli Family Hotel

Bulli railway station

Bulli Coal Train, a remnant of the type of train that transported coal

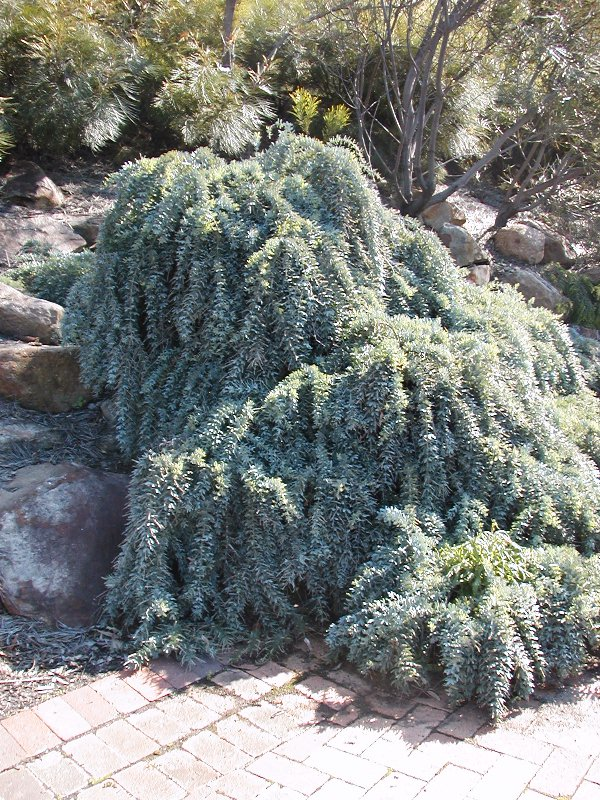
Prostrate Cootamundra Wattle in Grevillea Park

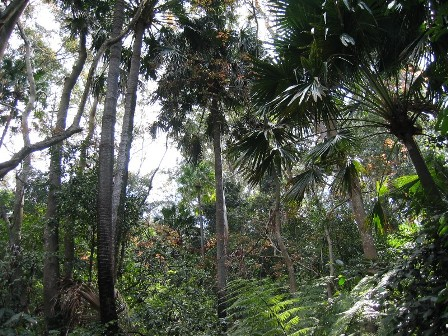
Slacky Flat Park
