= List of Wollongong suburbs =

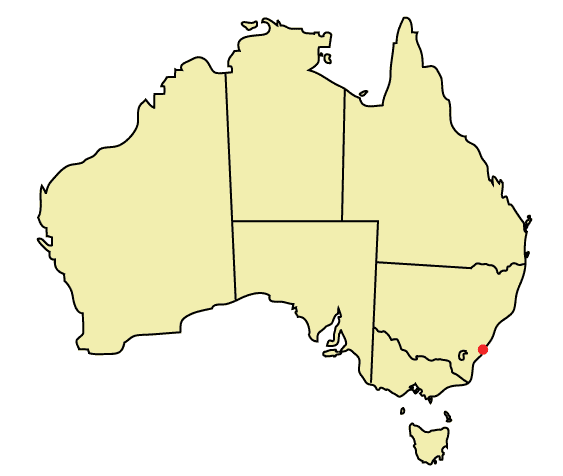

This is listing of the suburbs and localities in the greater Wollongong metropolitan area in alphabetical order.

Suburbs are listed here if they are inside the Wollongong metropolitan area and are listed in the Geographical Names Register as suburbs or localities, with some exclusions.^{(Excl.)} For this list the Wollongong metropolitan area is considered to be the Australian Bureau of Statistics's Wollongong Statistical District, which includes the Wollongong, Shellharbour and Kiama local government areas.

In some cases suburbs cross into other LGAs, or are effectively managed by other government bodies for specific purposes - these are noted where known.

- Albion Park ^{(Shell)}
- Albion Park Rail ^{(Shell)}
- Austinmer ^{(CoW)}
- Avon ^{(SCA,} ^{Wollondilly,} ^{CoW)}
- Avondale ^{(CoW)}
- Balgownie ^{(CoW)}
- Barrack Heights ^{(Shell)}
- Barrack Point ^{(Shell)}
- Bellambi ^{(CoW)}
- Berkeley ^{(CoW)}
- Blackbutt ^{(Shell)}
- Bombo ^{(Kiama)}
- Broughton Village ^{(Kiama)}
- Brownsville ^{(CoW)}
- Bulli ^{(CoW)}
- Calderwood ^{(Shell)}
- Carrington Falls ^{(Kiama)}
- Cataract ^{(CoW)}
- Cleveland ^{(CoW)}
- Clifton ^{(CoW)}
- Coalcliff ^{(CoW)}
- Coledale ^{(CoW)}
- Coniston ^{(CoW)}
- Cordeaux ^{(SCA,} ^{CoW)}
- Cordeaux Heights ^{(CoW)}
- Corrimal ^{(CoW)}
- Cringila ^{(CoW)}
- Croom ^{(Shell)}
- Curramore ^{(Kiama)}
- Dapto ^{(CoW)}
- Darkes Forest ^{(Wollondilly,} ^{CoW)}
- Dombarton ^{(CoW)}
- Dunmore ^{(Shell)}
- East Corrimal ^{(CoW)}
- Fairy Meadow ^{(CoW)}
- Farmborough Heights ^{(CoW)}
- Fernhill ^{(CoW)}
- Figtree ^{(CoW)}
- Flinders ^{(Shell)}
- Foxground ^{(Kiama)}
- Gerringong ^{(Kiama)}
- Gerroa ^{(Kiama)}
- Gwynneville ^{(CoW)}
- Haywards Bay ^{(CoW)}
- Helensburgh ^{(CoW)}
- Horsley ^{(CoW)}
- Huntley ^{(CoW)}
- Jamberoo ^{(Kiama)}
- Jerrara ^{(Kiama)}
- Kanahooka ^{(CoW)}
- Keiraville ^{(CoW)}
- Kembla Grange ^{(CoW)}
- Kembla Heights ^{(CoW)}
- Kiama ^{(Kiama)}
- Kiama Downs ^{(Kiama)}
- Kiama Heights ^{(Kiama)}
- Knights Hill ^{(Kiama)}
- Koonawarra ^{(CoW)}
- Lake Heights ^{(CoW)}
- Lake Illawarra ^{(Shell)}
- Lilyvale ^{(CoW,} ^{RNP)}
- Macquarie Pass ^{(Shell)}
- Maddens Plains ^{(CoW)}
- Mangerton ^{(CoW)}
- Marshall Mount ^{(CoW)}
- Minnamurra ^{(Kiama)}
- Mount Keira ^{(CoW)}
- Mount Kembla ^{(CoW)}
- Mount Ousley ^{(CoW)}
- Mount Pleasant ^{(CoW)}
- Mount Saint Thomas ^{(CoW)}
- Mount Warrigal ^{(Shell)}
- North Macquarie ^{(Shell)}
- North Wollongong ^{(CoW)}
- Oak Flats ^{(Shell)}
- Oak Heights ^{(Shell)}
- Otford ^{(CoW)}
- Port Kembla ^{(CoW)}
- Primbee ^{(CoW)}
- Rose Valley ^{(Kiama)}
- Russell Vale ^{(CoW)}
- Saddleback Mountain ^{(Kiama)}
- Scarborough ^{(CoW)}
- Shell Cove ^{(Shell)}
- Shellharbour ^{(Shell)}
- Shellharbour City Centre ^{(Shell)}
- Spring Hill ^{(CoW)}
- Stanwell Park ^{(CoW)}
- Stanwell Tops ^{(CoW)}
- Tarrawanna ^{(CoW)}
- Thirroul ^{(CoW)}
- Tongarra ^{(Shell)}
- Toolijooa ^{(Kiama)}
- Towradgi ^{(CoW)}
- Tullimbar ^{(Shell)}
- Unanderra ^{(CoW)}
- Upper Kangaroo Valley ^{(CoW)}
- Warilla ^{(Shell)}
- Warrawong ^{(CoW)}
- Werri Beach ^{(Kiama)}
- West Wollongong ^{(CoW)}
- Willow Vale ^{(Kiama)}
- Windang ^{(CoW)}
- Wollongong ^{(CoW)}
- Wollognong East ^{(abs)}
- Wombarra
- Wongawilli ^{(CoW)}
- Woonona ^{(CoW)}
- Yallah ^{(CoW,} ^{Shell)}
- Yellow Rock ^{(Shell)}

== Notes ==
^CoW	Located within the City of Wollongong
^Excl.	Brogers Creek and Broughton listed in the GNR under Kiama but are believed to be predominantly located in Shoalhaven LGA and have been excluded.
^Kiama	Located within the Municipality of Kiama
^RNP	Part of the Royal National Park and managed by National Parks and Wildlife Service (New South Wales)
^SCA	Part of the Upper Nepean Scheme and managed by Sydney Catchment Authority
^Shell	Located within the City of Shellharbour
^Wollondilly	Shared with Wollondilly Shire
