= Huntley, New South Wales (Wollongong) =

Huntley
- Suburb
- Coordinates: 34°29′50″S 150°44′07″E
- Country: Australia
- State: New South Wales
- City: Wollongong
- LGA: City of Wollongong

Government
  - State electorate: Shellharbour
  - Federal division: Whitlam

Population
  - Total: 66 (SAL 2021)
- Postcode: 2530
Suburbs around Huntley
	Wongawilli	Horsley
Avon	Huntley	Cleveland
	Avondale

Huntley is a suburb of the City of Wollongong to the west of Dapto. At the 2021 census, it had a population of 66.

The Geographical Names Board of New South Wales assigned the name of Huntley to the suburb on 5 August 2005. It had previously been called West Dapto or considered to be part of Avondale. It was named after a coal mine located within its boundary. The mine's name "Huntley" came from Huntly, a coal mining town in the North Island of New Zealand, which originally had this spelling. The original owners of the Huntley colliery, Illawarra Coal, had associations with the New Zealand mine.
