= Wongawilli =

- Suburb
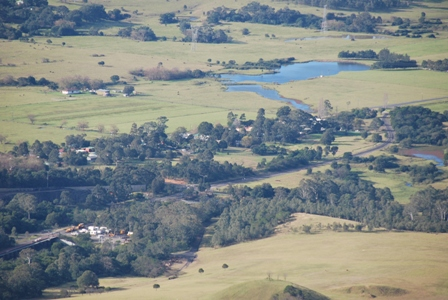

- Coordinates: 34°28.5′S 150°45.5′E
- Country: Australia
- State: New South Wales
- City: Wollongong
- LGA: City of Wollongong

Government
  - State electorate: Shellharbour
  - Federal division: Whitlam
- Elevation: 24 m (79 ft)

Population
  - Total: 1,213 (2021 census)
- Postcode: 2530
Suburbs around Wongawilli
| Avon | Dombarton | Kembla Grange |
| Avon | Wongawilli | Brownsville |
| Huntley | Huntley | Horsley |

Wongawilli is a southern suburb of Wollongong, Australia at the foot hills of the Illawarra escarpment. The word "Wonga" is a native Aboriginal word meaning native pigeon.

It contains a mixture of small rural properties and family homes. It has a New South Wales Rural Fire Service station and a small community hall where the Wongawilli colonial dance club meets regularly. The community has had a long history with coal mining, with the Wongawilli colliery opening in 1916 by the Hoskins brothers, and later being taken over by BHP. Since this time the mine has expanded and has had multiple owners, and is currently owned and operated by the Indian company Jindal Steel and Power.

== Notable residents ==
- Actor John Jarratt, born 1952
- Australian Rugby League player Robert Smithies, born 1948
