= Avondale, New South Wales =

Avondale
- Suburb
- Coordinates: 34°31′36″S 150°43′56″E
- Country: Australia
- State: New South Wales
- Region: Illawarra
- City: Wollongong
- LGA: City of Wollongong

Government
  - State electorate: Kiama
  - Federal division: Whitlam

Population
  - Total: 1,695 (2021 census)
- Postcode: 2500
- County: Camden
- Parish: Calderwood
Suburbs around Avondale
	Huntley	Cleveland
Avon	Avondale	Yallah
	Marshall Mount

Avondale is a village in New South Wales. It is located just west of Lake Illawarra. At the 2021 census, it had a population of 1,695.

== Population ==
At the 2021 census, Avondale had a population of 1,695. 80.8% of people were born in Australia. The most next common country of birth was England at 5.4%. 88.5% of people only spoke English at home. The most common responses for religion were No Religion 39.5%, Catholic 20.7% and Anglican 16.8%.

== See also ==
- Dapto, New South Wales
