= Dombarton =

- Coordinates: 34.456°S 150.765°E
- Country: Australia
- State: New South Wales
- City: Wollongong
- LGA: City of Wollongong

Government
  - State electorate: Shellharbour
  - Federal division: Whitlam

Population
  - Total: 130 (2016 census)
- Postcode: 2526
Localities around Dombarton
Lake Avon, Avon	Lake Cordeaux	Kembla Heights
Avon	Dombarton	Farmborough Heights, Kembla Grange
Wongawilli	Horsley	Brownsville

Dombarton is a rural locality north west of Dapto in the Wollongong LGA, in the Illawarra region of New South Wales, Australia, located on the western side of Lake Illawarra. It is also known for the uncompleted Maldon–Dombarton railway line.
