= Horsley Homestead =

Historic site in Australia

- Location within New South Wales Location within Australia
- 34.4860°S 150.7790°E
- Location: Bong Bong Road, Dapto, City of Wollongong, New South Wales, Australia

History
- Built: 1842–1909

Site notes
- Owner: Rodney and Mary Young

New South Wales Heritage Register
- Official name: Horsley Homestead; Horsley Homestead; West Horsley Place
- Type: State heritage (built)
- Designated: 4 August 2000
- Reference no.: 134
- Type: Homestead Complex
- Category: Farming and Grazing

Horsley Homestead is a heritage-listed residence at Horsley Drive, Dapto in the Illawarra region of New South Wales, Australia. It was built from 1842 to 1909. The homestead has also previously served as a museum (1972-1985) and as a function venue (1985-1992). It was added to the New South Wales State Heritage Register on 4 August 2000.

== History ==
William Frances Weston, his wife Elizabeth, and son John were among the first free settlers in the Illawarra, when they took up 500 acres at Dapto in 1818. The land was given to them by Governor Macquarie as a "promise grant", one yet to be ratified by King George III. W. F. Weston named the property "West Horsley Place" after his home in Surrey. He died at the property in 1826, leaving his wife and five children. The 1828 census records Elizabeth Weston and children still residing there, with 500 acres, 40 acres cleared, 25 acres cultivated, and 35 horned cattle.

In 1830, Elizabeth Weston married a convict, Thomas Williamson. The 1841 census records the Williamsons living at Horsley, with Elizabeth Weston as landlady to 21 tenants. The farm had become a small village with 84 people in 21 slab houses, some were free, others were convicts. On 13 January 1842, Governor Gipps ratified the promised grant of 1818. It was bequeathed to William and Elizabeth Weston's daughters, Elizabeth and Augusta.

The first section of the house, with four rooms and a central hall, was built prior to 1842. In 1843, Elizabeth Weston Jr. married Andrew Thompson, and it became their home. In 1866, John Lindsay bought West Horsley Place from Augusta Brooks (née Weston), and renamed the property Horsley. John's son, George Lindsay operated as a dairy farm with a high quality Ayrshire herd. George was a successful exhibitor at the local and Sydney Agricultural Shows. George also purchased a butchery business with three shops, and a piggery for his son John Hessel Lindsay who became a partner in the Illawarra Meat Company.

In 1947, George Lindsay died aged 91, and his son, Arthur Lindsay inherited the property. In October 1968, Ron and Judy Holloway bought 27 acres with Horsley homestead from Arthur Lindsay.

The land was sold to developers in 1972, and Horsley, with 2.59 hectares (5.7 acres) was bought by Mr and Mrs C. Neaves for restoration and exhibition. Marlene Neaves set up a museum at Horsley and conducted tours there until at least 1985. A building called the "Old Albion Park Store" was relocated onto Horsley's site as part of this museum

In 1985-86, Peter and Prue Fyfe purchased and lived at Horsley, and operated a venue for occasions such as wedding receptions. Prue also had a wholesale/retail business in Thai imports. On 28 November 1992, Dr and Mrs Robert Pescud bought Horsley with 2.071 hectares (4.5 acres) as a private home. Since 2001 the property has been in the ownership of Rod and Mary Young.

== Description ==
The property consists of a complex of buildings on a northern slope, with the farm buildings along the ridge line. The house faces north over Robins Creek with Mount Kembla in the distance.

The property was originally accessed from West Dapto Road to the north, over Robins Creek. Early natural round gate posts identify the entry point to the front yard. A line of fig trees identifies the earliest approach to the property while a later alignment was angled slightly to the west and is likely to date to the use of the creamery as a cheese factory. The house and garden are surrounded by a Tecoma hedge. Other typical 19th century plantings in the garden include a Bunya Bunya Pine and a row of five Morton Bay Fig Trees (now in separate ownership).

The access road was changed to a drive from Bong Bong road to the south. Bong Bong road was proposed in 1861 and an aerial photograph taken in 1948 shows an overgrown, disused track from the north with an older track branched off along the row of fig trees and a clear track in use from Bong Bong Road, entering the homestead along the alignment that is still in use today, adjacent to the west of the stable.

The house is a Georgian style building built from limewashed brick in two main stages; Initially c.1842, there was a central hall with two rooms either side. This was extended by the addition of rooms along the east and west. The back and front verandahs were used to access the later rooms. The interior has cedar joinery throughout. Behind the house there is a detached, random rubble kitchen with opposing doors in the southern and northern walls. The interior has a maids room, stone floor and a large open fireplace. It is possible that the kitchen predates the house as the first cottage. There is also a detached dairy (creamery) adjacent to the west of the house constructed from bricks similar to those used in the house. The dairy was converted to a cheese and butter factory in c.1880 using beaded timber partitions. The house, kitchen and dairy have slate roofs.

The farm buildings form a row. The easternmost building is the random rubble stable which retains timber stalls and stone floor. The original slate roof has been replaced with corrugated iron. The loft was used as a corn store. Across the driveway is a timber framed, corrugated iron milking shed with the bails removed and a chaff cutting area. This is adjacent to an early (1909) reinforced concrete silo which has a replacement hexagonal timber roof. The westernmost building is a large cow shed built using natural round posts and rails to form two rows of stalls with a central aisle. This is the only local example of a cow shed where the cows were tethered using traditional fixtures.

The original 500 acre property has been subdivided multiple times. However the remaining 2.071 hectares contains the original farm buildings and significant landscape elements. The buildings have been well maintained.

The buildings and their setting remain significantly intact.

=== Modifications and dates ===
- c. 1818 - Site was occupied. The stone rubble kitchen may be an earlier cottage from the establishment phase.
- c. 1842 or earlier - central hall and 4 rooms. Dairy (creamery); Horsley butter fetched 4 shillings / pound in Sydney in the 1850s; Stables
- c. 1872 Eastern and western rooms of house added.
- 1880 - Dairy (creamery) used as cheese factory, access track from north is likely to have still been in use.
- 1909 - reinforced concrete silo, early for district; ( Alne Bank, Gerringong 1908)
- date of milking bail shed / chaff cutting shed, cow shed is unknown, likely to relate to silo.
- 1971 - cheese and butter making tools donated to Illawarra Historical Society Museum.
- c. 1980 -Hazeltons Grocery Hardware and Haberdashery shop was moved to Horsley from Albion Park; public WC built; silo re-roofed.
- Early/mid 1980s room built between house and dairy, retained dairy as separate building.

== Heritage listing ==
Horsley Homestead is a rare intact example of a 19th-century Georgian style farm complex and garden in Illawarra. The property was one of the earliest to be owner occupied and was associated with the Lindsay family who was influential in the dairy industry and region, particularly rural based activities. The property demonstrates building materials, techniques and design used in the Illawarra throughout the 1800s. The site includes one of the earliest known reinforced concrete silos, the only cow shed known in Illawarra where cattle were individually tethered and an early random rubble stable with timber stalls. The house is a fine example of early 19th century rural architecture with the original detached stone kitchen and separate brick and stone dairy.

Horsley Homestead was listed on the New South Wales State Heritage Register on 4 August 2000 having satisfied the following criteria.

The place is important in demonstrating the course, or pattern, of cultural or natural history in New South Wales.

Horsley is associated with the Western Family who settled on the property in 1818, one of the first to owner occupiers in the district. It is associated with the clearing lease settlement process, and supported numerous small tenancies, typical of the early 1800s. Horsley is associated with the Lindsay family who were innovative farmers and regional leaders in the dairy industry. Horsley is associated with the evolution of the dairy industry in Illawarra. The region became renowned for progressive herd and pasture techniques enabling it to become a major supplier of milk to the Sydney market.

The place is important in demonstrating aesthetic characteristics and/or a high degree of creative or technical achievement in New South Wales.

Horsley is sited on a knoll and forms a visual landmark, made distinctive by the significant elements of its 19th century garden including significant trees; a Bunya Bunya Pine, 5 Morton Bay Figs, Tecoma Hedge and the early farm buildings; the house with a detached kitchen and separate dairy (creamery), stables, milking bail and chaff cutting shed, early silo and cow shed.

The place has strong or special association with a particular community or cultural group in New South Wales for social, cultural or spiritual reasons.

The property was operated as a museum followed by a function venue during the 1970s and 80s. The current owners have also opened the house and grounds to the public on a number of occasions to raise funds for others. Earlier owners were publicly minded and held civic roles. Consequently, Horsley is well known and highly regarded by the past and present community. This regard is reflected in the property's inclusion on all relevant heritage lists.

The place has potential to yield information that will contribute to an understanding of the cultural or natural history of New South Wales.

The silo and chaff cutting area demonstrates the technological shift to improved pasture and all year round nutrient supply for dairy herds. The Illawarra region was quick to invest in improved breeding and feeding of Dairy Herds and the Lindsay family, owners of Horsley, pioneered these techniques in the district. The site has evolved throughout the 19th and early 20th centuries and demonstrates building techniques employed during that time. The site has been occupied since 1818 and remains relatively undisturbed. It is considered to have high archaeological potential.

The place possesses uncommon, rare or endangered aspects of the cultural or natural history of New South Wales.

Horsley remains as a rare, substantially intact complex of 19th century dairy farm buildings with significant landscape elements, in central Illawarra, which was a major dairying region until the mid 1900s. The property retains rare examples of dairy related structures including an early reinforced concrete silo, cow shed with tethering fixtures, 19th century stone stable with timber stalls and brick dairy (creamery).

The place is important in demonstrating the principal characteristics of a class of cultural or natural places/environments in New South Wales.

The site represents the 19th century dairying practises through the building materials, construction techniques and location of the structures within the landscape. The major landscape elements including the Bunya Bunya Pine, Tecoma hedge and natural round gate posts within the site and the row of Morton Bay Fig trees adjoining the site, now in different ownership, represent plants and features used in major 19th century gardens in Illawarra and other rural areas.
