= Reg Piper =

- Assistant Bishop
- Diocese: Sydney
- Previous post: Bishop of Wollongong (1993 – 2007)

Orders
- Ordination: 1967

Personal details
- Born: Reginald John Piper; 25 February 1942 (age 84) Goulburn, New South Wales
- Denomination: Anglicanism
- Spouse: Dorothy Piper
- Occupation: Bishop
- Education: Corrimal High School
- Alma mater: Australian National University; Moore Theological College

Reginald John Piper (born 25 February 1942) was an assistant bishop in the Anglican Diocese of Sydney who served as the Bishop of Wollongong from 1993 to 2007.

Piper was born in Goulburn and educated at Corrimal High School and at the Australian National University. After studying at Moore Theological College he was ordained in 1967. He had curacies at St Stephen's Willoughby (1966-69) and St Clement's Lalor Park (1969-72) before incumbencies at St Aidan's Hurstville Grove (1972-75), Christ Church, Kiama (1975-80) and Holy Trinity, Adelaide (1980-93) before his ordination to the episcopate. He was awarded a Doctor of Ministry from Fuller Seminary in 1992. Upon his retirement as Bishop of Wollongong, he served as Rector of Gymea (2007-10) then as a part-time Senior Assistant Minister at St Michael's Cathedral, Wollongong from 2010. He is married to Dorothy Piper.

Piper has published multiple studies "for Lent and other season" through Youthworks Media:

- Ephesus and the New Humanity,
- From Rome with Love,
- The God who is For Us,
- The Life and Labours of Paul,
- The Things that Make for Peace.
- The King Has Come
