= East Corrimal =

- Suburb
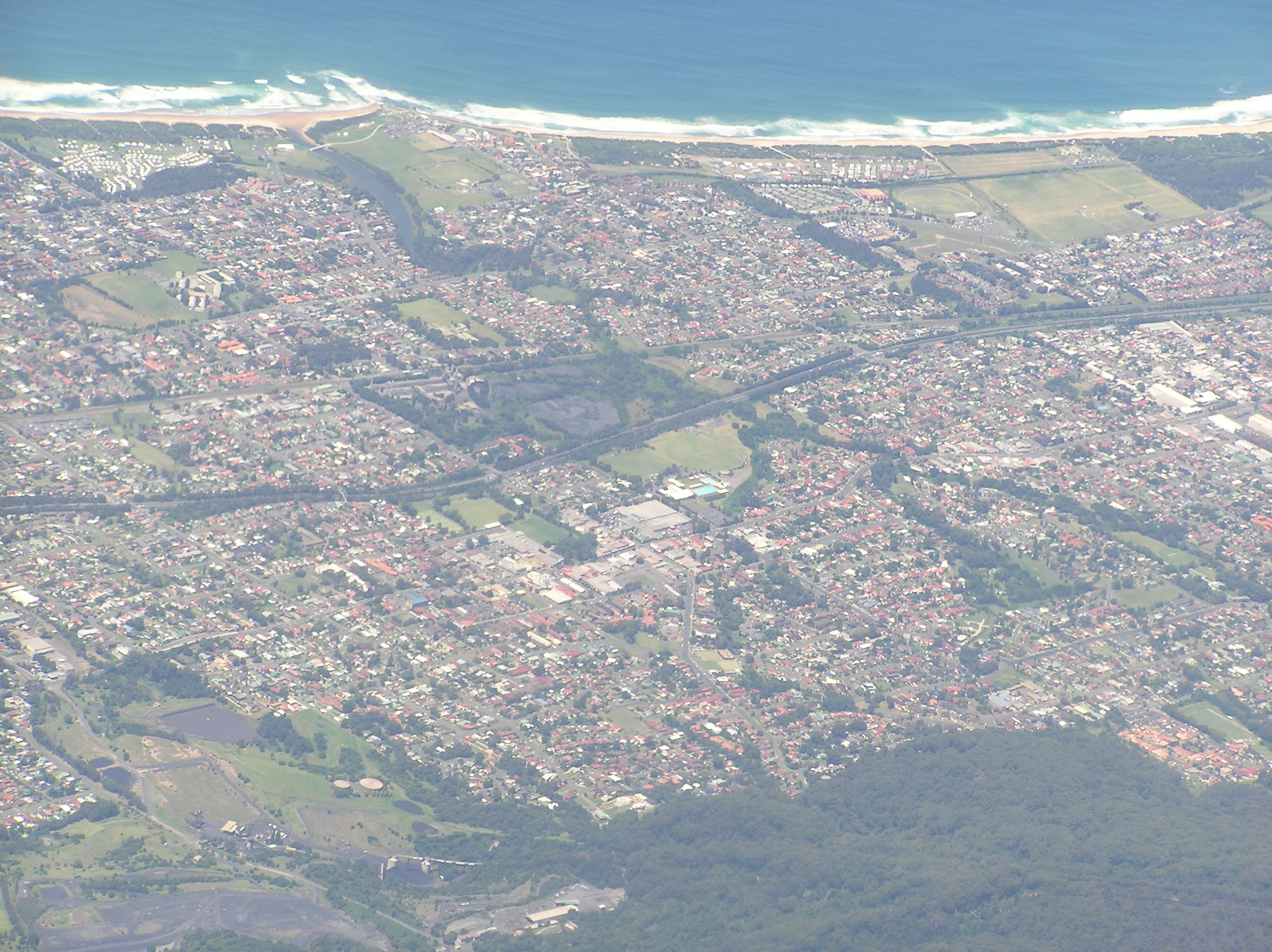
- Aerial photo overlooking Corrimal and Tarrawanna to East Corrimal

- Coordinates: 34°22′35″S 150°54′39″E
- Country: Australia
- State: New South Wales
- City: Wollongong
- LGA: City of Wollongong
- Location: 77 km (48 mi) south of Sydney; 6 km (3.7 mi) north of Wollongong

Government
  - State electorate: Keira
  - Federal division: Cunningham
- Elevation: 10 m (33 ft)

Population
  - Total: 3,432 (2021 census)
- Postcode: 2518
Suburbs around East Corrimal
Corrimal; Russell Vale	Bellambi	Bellambi
Corrimal	East Corrimal	Pacific Ocean
Towradgi	Towradgi	Pacific Ocean

East Corrimal is a northern seaside suburb of Wollongong, New South Wales, Australia. Predominantly residential, the suburb includes Corrimal High School and Corrimal East Public School, as well as Corrimal Beach and Corrimal Beach Tourist Park at the eastern end. A public park was opened in 1959 to the west of the high school and north of the primary school, named Phil Adams Park, which features tall trees, paths and several seats.

The South Coast railway line forms the western boundary of East Corrimal and separates it from its sister suburb Corrimal. It is served by Corrimal railway station.

The suburb takes its name from a point on the nearby Illawarra escarpment which was known as Mount Corrimal (named after the Aboriginal Dreamtime warrior Kurimul), and now called Broker's Nose.

== Schools ==
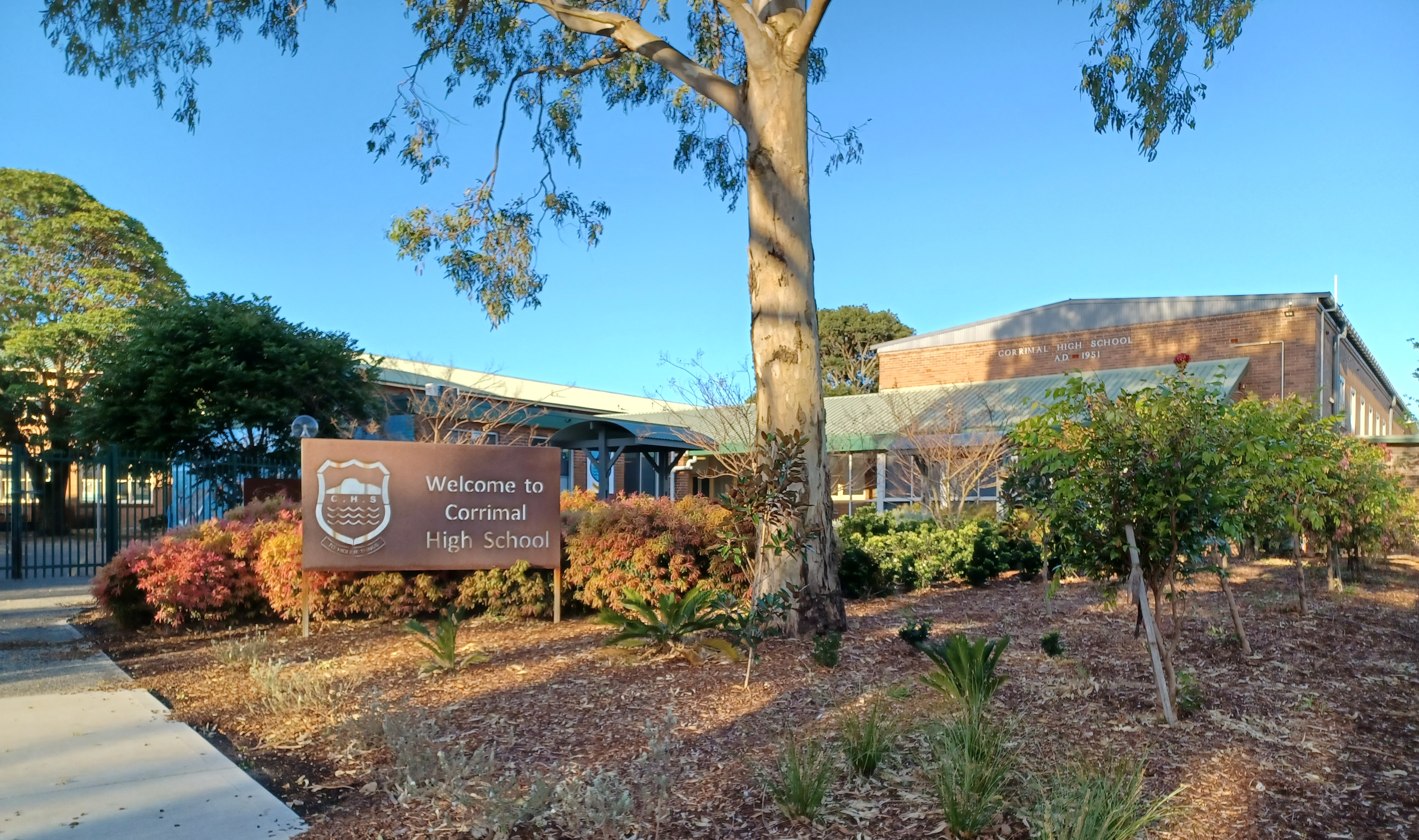
Corrimal High School

Corrimal High School is located in East Corrimal. Corrimal East Public School is a local public primary school, established in 1952.

== See also ==
- Broker's Nose
- Corrimal
- Corrimal High School
