= Coniston, New South Wales =

Coniston
- Suburb
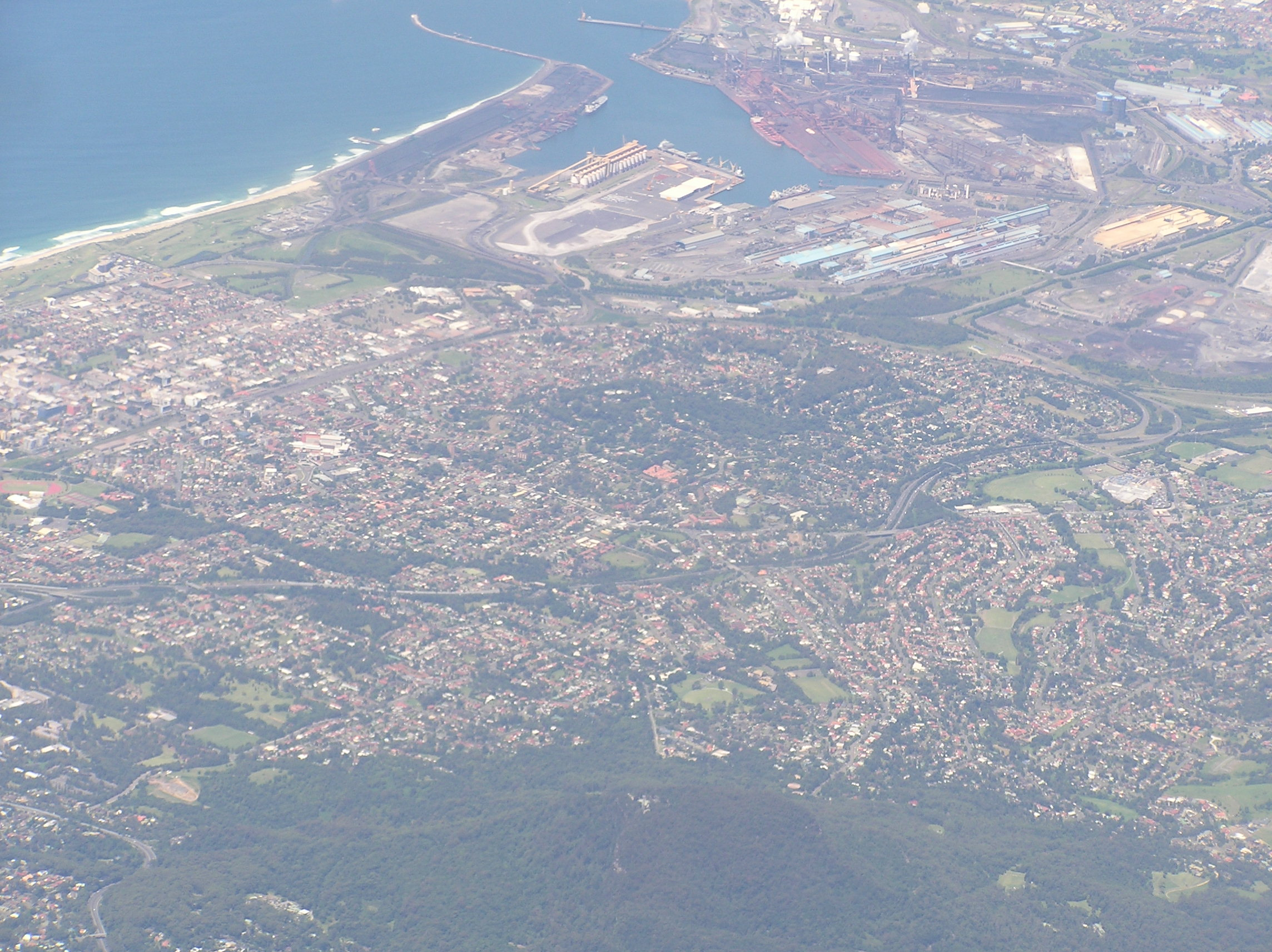

- Coordinates: 34°26′S 150°53′E
- Country: Australia
- State: New South Wales
- City: Wollongong
- LGA: City of Wollongong
- Location: 89 km (55 mi) S of Sydney; 2 km (1.2 mi) S of Wollongong; 38 km (24 mi) N of Kiama

Government
  - State electorate: Wollongong
  - Federal division: Cunningham
- Elevation: 22 m (72 ft)

Population
  - Total: 2,267 (2021 census)
- Postcode: 2500
Suburbs around Coniston
Mangerton	Wollongong	Wollongong
Mangerton	Coniston	Wollongong
Mt St Thomas	Spring Hill	Port Kembla

Coniston (/kɒnɪstən/ CON-ist-ən), is a suburb of Wollongong in New South Wales, Australia. At the 2021 census, it had a population of 2,267.

Coniston is just north of the Port Kembla Steelworks and includes the Greenhouse Park, a one time waste pile converted into a natural park area with a weather station. The hill, known locally as "The Overseer" has a lookout over the city and Port Kembla. Coniston is also bordered to the west by the hill suburbs of Mangerton and Mount Saint Thomas.

Coniston has a variety of businesses including The Coniston Hotel, formally Gilmore's Hotel, a bakery, 24 Hour petrol station and several other specialty stores. Coniston has long been serviced with its own Bulk Billing Medical Centre, Coniston is also well known for its successful football club, Coniston FC.

== Sport ==
Coniston is also home to the Coniston Football Club. The juniors play at McKinnon Park, and the seniors play at J.J.Kelly Park. Coniston Football Club participate in the Illawarra Premier League, having won the 1981, 2001, and 2023 grand finals.

== Landmarks and Environment ==
Coniston includes the Greenhouse Park, a significant environmental site south of the Wollongong City Centre. The park is based on the Tom Thumb Lagoon salt marsh, but the land was historically used as a municipal waste depot and builders' landfill from the 1940s until 1994. Since the 1990s, the City of Wollongong and volunteers have successfully rehabilitated the site into a community green space, which now includes ponds for the endangered Green and Golden Bell Frog, native habitat, and community gardens. The park was officially launched in 1999 and has since won awards for its environmental work.

The hill on the western boundary, known locally as The Overseer, provides a lookout point over Wollongong and the Port Kembla industrial area.

== Transport ==
Coniston railway station is the suburb's main train station.

Coniston has multiple bus stops which are served by Premier Illawarra.

== Demographics ==
In the 2021 Census, there were 2,267 people in Coniston. The most common ancestries were English 26.6%, Australian 25.8%, Macedonian 11.8%, Irish 8.6% and Scottish 8.0%. 64.8% of people were born in Australia. The next most common country of birth was the Former Yugoslav Republic of Macedonia (now the Republic of North Macedonia) at 6.7%. 62.9% of people spoke only English at home. Other languages spoken at home included Macedonian 9.4%. The most common responses for religion in Coniston were No Religion 34.9%, Catholic 16.3%, Eastern Orthodox 14.2% and Anglican 7.6%.

== See also ==
- Drummond Battery
- Greenhouse Park
