= Towradgi =

- Suburb
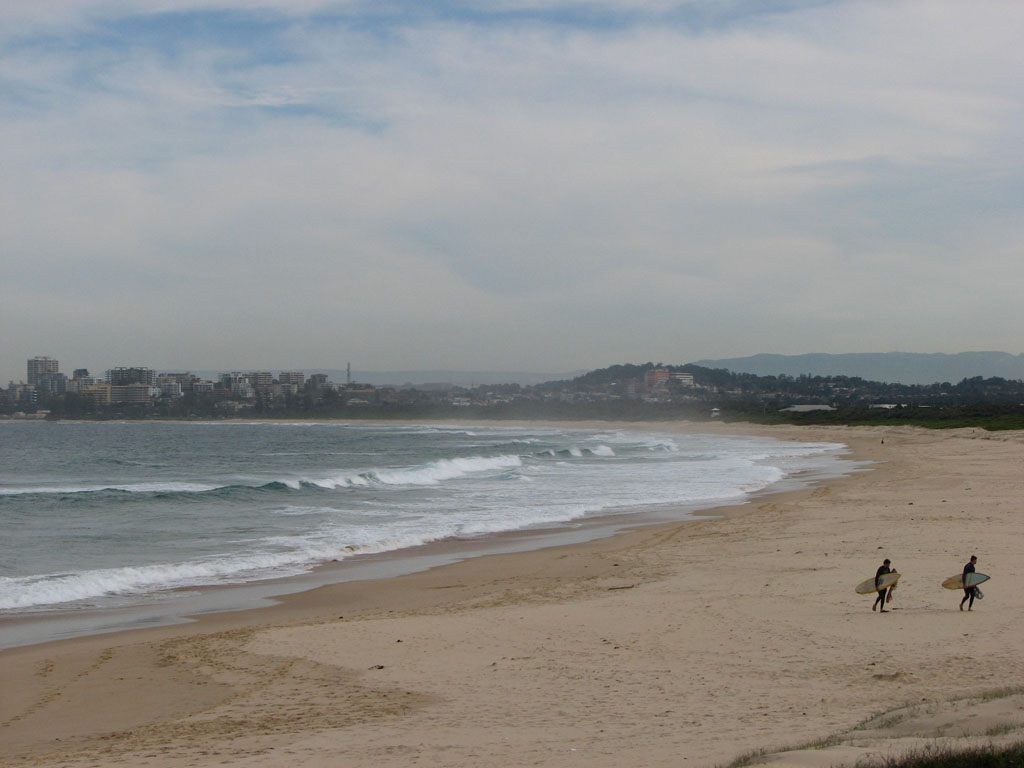
- Towradgi Beach, looking south to Wollongong

- Coordinates: 34°23′S 150°54′E
- Country: Australia
- State: New South Wales
- City: Wollongong
- LGA: City of Wollongong
- Location: 78 km (48 mi) S of Sydney; 5 km (3.1 mi) N of Wollongong

Government
  - State electorate: Wollongong
  - Federal division: Cunningham
- Elevation: 15 m (49 ft)

Population
  - Total: 3,241 (2021 census)
- Postcode: 2518
Suburbs around Towradgi
| Corrimal | East Corrimal | Pacific Ocean |
| Tarrawanna, Fernhill | Towradgi | Pacific Ocean |
| | Fairy Meadow | Pacific Ocean |

Towradgi (/taʊərædʒi/) is a small beach-side suburb north of Wollongong, New South Wales, Australia. Towradgi is derived from the Dharawal word Kow-radgi, meaning "guardian of the sacred stones". On an early map it was called Towroger.

== Transport ==
Towradgi is served by electric trains at Towradgi railway station, opened in 1948.

== Geography ==
Towradgi is bordered to the north by Corrimal, the west by Fernhill and Tarrawanna, and to the south by Fairy Meadow. The Pacific Ocean is to the east. Towradgi incorporates much of the former suburb of Reidtown (to the south-west), some of which has been incorporated into Fairy Meadow.

East of Towradgi is Towradgi Point, the location of the Towradgi rockpool, a rocky projection to the east. The rockpool is at the tip of the point. To the north is the entrance to Towradgi Creek and to the south and north are small areas of rocks, known as "Black Rocks".

Towradgi Creek goes inland from Corrimal Beach. Erosion from June 2007 storms damaged the beach and some beach entrance tracks.

== Amenities ==
Towradgi has a surf club, a bowling and recreation club, restaurant, croquet club, 2 petrol stations, hairdresser, retirement village, Towradgi Public School, train station, many parks, and a rock pool.

== Landmarks ==
One of Towradgi's landmarks is the small bridge on Towradgi Road that passes over the south coast train line at Towradgi station. This bridge is known as "the hump" due to its short and steep rise, and it is not uncommon for cars to become airborne if they pass over this bridge at enough speed.

The Wollongong to Thirroul Bike Track crosses the bridge and splits into two designated paths. The path passes the point, which hosts a park.

== History ==
A short distance out to sea from Corrimal Beach is the point where the barque clipper, Queen of Nations, was wrecked on 31 May 1881. It lies just north of the pools and, at low tide, a darkish blur marks it. A plaque at the point tells the story of the wreck. The captain, Samuel Bache, in a drunken state, mistook the Mount Keira coal mine slag heap fires for the lighthouse on Port Jackson's South Head in Sydney. The first mate was equally drunk and threatened crew members. It is now a protected wreck site. The ship was transporting alcohol, which may explain this accident.

South of the point is a site where George Bass and Matthew Flinders, with their helper Martin, unsuccessfully attempted to land. A plaque commemorates the near-lossof their vessel, the Tom Thumb, on 21 March 1796. They managed to bail it out and continue.

The bridge across the creek was remade in 2006.

Towradgi

Climate chart (precipitation, max. and min. temperature)
| J | F | M | A | M | J | J | A | S | O | N | D |
| 83 25 19 | 83 25 19 | 133 24 18 | 119 22 16 | 86 20 13 | 130 18 11 | 81 17 10 | 98 18 11 | 67 20 13 | 76 22 14 | 103 22 16 | 77 24 18 |
- █ Average max. and min. temperatures in °C
- █ Precipitation totals in mm
- Source: Australian Meteorology
Imperial conversion
| J | F | M | A | M | J | J | A | S | O | N | D |
| 3.3 77 66 | 3.3 77 67 | 5.2 75 65 | 4.7 72 60 | 3.4 68 56 | 5.1 64 52 | 3.2 62 50 | 3.9 64 51 | 2.6 68 55 | 3 71 57 | 4 72 60 | 3 75 64 |
- █ Average max. and min. temperatures in °F
- █ Precipitation totals in inches
