= Mount Saint Thomas =

- Suburb
- Coordinates: 34°26′31″S 150°52′16″E
- Country: Australia
- State: New South Wales
- City: Wollongong
- LGA: City of Wollongong
- Location: 87 km (54 mi) from Sydney; 3 km (1.9 mi) from Wollongong

Government
  - State electorate: Wollongong
  - Federal division: Cunningham
- Elevation: 29 m (95 ft)

Population
  - Total: 1,449 (2021 census)
- Postcode: 2500
Suburbs around Mount Saint Thomas
Figtree	Mangerton	Coniston
Figtree	Mount Saint Thomas
Figtree	Spring Hill

Mount Saint Thomas is a suburb of Wollongong in New South Wales, lying east of Figtree and South west of Wollongong. At the 2021 census, it had a population of 1,449.

During World War II, the Drummond Battery was constructed in the suburb as part of the defences for Port Kembla.
