= Cleveland, New South Wales =

Cleveland Wollongong, New South Wales
- Coordinates: 34°30′11″S 150°46′05″E
- Population: 22 (2021 census)
- Postcode(s): 2530
- LGA(s): City of Wollongong
- State electorate(s): Shellharbour
- Federal division(s): Whitlam
Suburbs around Cleveland:
Wongawilli	Wongawilli	Horsley
Huntley	Cleveland	Dapto
Avondale	Yallah	Dapto

Cleveland is a suburb of the City of Wollongong to the west of Dapto. At the 2021 census, it had a population of 22.

The Geographical Names Board of New South Wales assigned the name of Cleveland to the suburb on 5 August 2005. The name was derived from a historical farmhouse, which was located in the southwest of the suburb. The City of Wollongong and the New South Wales government have developed plans over many years for suburban development in the area.
