= Corrimal =

- Suburb
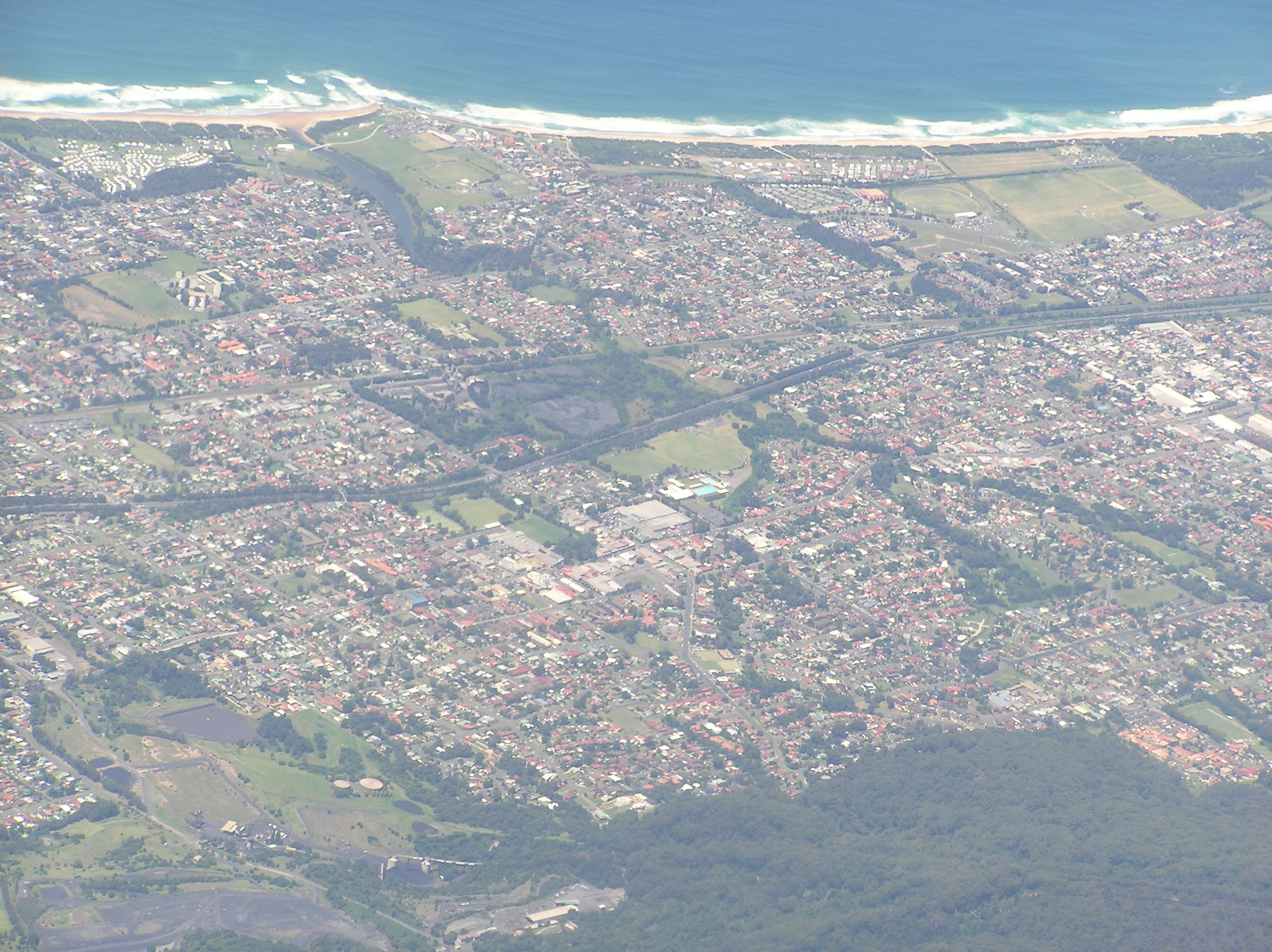
- Aerial photo of Corrimal to Tarrawanna

- Coordinates: 34°22′S 150°53.5′E
- Country: Australia
- State: New South Wales
- City: Wollongong
- LGA: City of Wollongong
- Location: 77 km (48 mi) south of Sydney; 6 km (3.7 mi) north of Wollongong

Government
  - State electorates: Keira; Wollongong
  - Federal division: Cunningham
- Elevation: 25 m (82 ft)

Population
  - Total: 6,972 (2021 census)
- Postcode: 2518
Suburbs around Corrimal
	Russell Vale	Bellambi
	Corrimal	East Corrimal
Tarrawanna	Fernhill	Towradgi

Corrimal is a suburb north of the city of Wollongong, New South Wales, Australia. Corrimal's CBD is situated on the Princes Highway, and several streets adjacent to it. The main shopping centres are Lederer Corrimal and Corrimal Park Mall next to the park on the main thoroughfare of Corrimal itself. Outside this centre is an old locomotive that is affectionately known as "The Green Frog". Corrimal's welcome signs feature The Green Frog, as it ran on the Bulli Colliery Line to Bellambi Haven from 1909 to 1967. To the west is a lawn bowls club and a wealthy foothill neighbourhood of residences bordering bushland.

Immediately west of Corrimal railway station is the Corrimal Cokeworks, after 100 years of operation it closed in 2014. The towers are a prominent local sight and can be seen from Wollongong. The railway crosses the first level crossing north of Wollongong immediately north of the station. On the second Sunday in September Corrimal hosts the annual Spring Into Corrimal family festival, which includes market stalls on the closed main streets, a parade, contest and other activities. 2009 was the 30th anniversary of the parade. In the 2007 festival, the world's largest skateboard was displayed. In 2018 the attendance rate was approx. 70,000 people and cemented "Spring into Corrimal" as the largest one day free family festival in Regional NSW.

== History ==
The suburb takes its name from a point on the bordering Illawarra escarpment which was known as Mount Corrimal (named after the Aboriginal Dreamtime warrior Kurimul) and now called Broker's Nose. It could also mean Black Mountain (corri mala) as it is a coal belt. The first industry and settlement at Corrimal was that of logging, followed by mining operations. In 1830 the first grant of land was made, to James Martin, of 50 acres (200,000 m^{2}). Corrimal was first recorded in 1839 when a grant was sold at Corrimal. In 1834 the Bulli Parish road was made with convict labour, directed by Major Mitchell. In 1883 Thomas Bertram opened the Corrimal colliery, also known as the Corrimal-Balgownie Colliery.

Corrimal station opened in 1887, when bullock teams ceased transporting coal from the mine to the railway and were replaced by a private colliery line constructed by the Southern Coal Company, which had taken over operations from Bertram. In 1889, Broker's Nose Colliery was renamed Corrimal Colliery, which closed in 1985. Streets ice cream was founded there in the 1930s.

== Commercial ==
Corrimal's community is serviced by Corrimal Chamber of Commerce (CCC), a volunteer organisation that formed in 1949 who then supported the businesses houses. In 2014 the new President (Paul Boultwood) and his committee developed a community arm to also help the citizens of the area. The Corrimal Chamber of Commerce was instrumental in making Corrimal the first autism-friendly community in Australia. Since 2014 CCC has won the best Local Chamber of Commerce in the Illawarra 3 times (2014, 2018, 2019) and won the prestigious Best Local Chamber in NSW for 2018/2019. Also looking after the community is Corrimal Region Action Group (CRAG) (formally Corrimal Revitalization Action Group), a volunteer organization that is made up of community citizens and organizations for the betterment of Corrimal and surrounding suburbs. CRAG continues to work with Wollongong City Council to revitalize the township. CRAG were instrumental in developing the "Corrimal Town Centre Plan 2015–2025" along with Council. CRAG is a true volunteer organization that has no alignment to any political group and strives to work only for the citizens and area.

Corrimal is the birthplace of ice cream manufacturer Streets. Edwin (Ted) Street started making ice cream in a small churn, just after the depression, to supply his milk bar. It tasted so good that other shops wanted to buy it and before long, Mr. Street was supplying ice cream to dozens of shops in and out of the area. He built an ice works and factory near the corner of Princes Highway and Tarrawanna Road. Many locals still remember the huge neon sign, featuring a polar bear licking an ice cream outside the Corrimal Works (The first moving neon sign in Wollongong). Streets was sold to Unilever in 1960 and is still in operation.

== Education ==
Corrimal has four primary schools and one high school. St Columbkille's is Corrimal's local Roman Catholic school. There is also Corrimal Public School, Illawarra Adventist School (now defunct), Corrimal High School and Aspect, a school for children with autism.

== Transport ==
Corrimal is served by Corrimal railway station on the Illawarra railway line, located on Railway Street which connects the station to the heart of the town.

== Politics ==
Stephen Martin of the Australian Labor Party served as Corrimal's federal MP in the Australian House of Representatives for 18 years from 1984 until his resignation in 2002. Martin served as Speaker of the House under the Keating government from 4 May 1993 to 29 January 1996. The present Federal MP is Alison Byrnes, also of Labor. In state politics Ryan Park is the member for Keira and at time of writing Ryan is the Shadow minister for Health and the Shadow Minister for the Illawarra.

Corrimal was formerly in the seat of Macarthur, until the 1993 redistribution transferred it to Cunningham.

== Sport ==
The most popular sport in the suburb is rugby league, with the local team, the Corrimal Cougars, representing Corrimal in the Illawarra Rugby League competition. Winners of First Grade titles in 1948 and 1974, the club plays its home games at Ziems Park.

1891- Corrimal Cougars Cricket Club and Corrimal Rangers Football Club established. 1912- Corrimal Cougars Rugby League team established, in the 1930s, Arthur Ziems donates land next to his butchery for a rugby league field.
