= Mangerton, New South Wales =

Mangerton
- Suburb
- Coordinates: 34°26′S 150°52′E
- Country: Australia
- State: New South Wales
- City: Wollongong
- LGA: City of Wollongong
- Location: 85 km (53 mi) from Sydney; 2 km (1.2 mi) from Wollongong

Government
  - State electorate: Wollongong
  - Federal division: Cunningham
- Elevation: 41 m (135 ft)

Population
  - Total: 2,862 (2021 census)
- Postcode: 2500
Suburbs around Mangerton
West Wollongong		Wollongong
Figtree	Mangerton	Coniston
	Mount Saint Thomas	Spring Hill

Mangerton is an inner western suburb of the coastal city of Wollongong, New South Wales, Australia.

== Description ==
The suburb is mostly residential with the exception of a convenience store in its southwestern area, Apart from this is a small area of bushland atop the hill. The suburb has many two-storey homes. Elizabeth Street has been voted the "Best Street" in the past. Mangerton is reached via sideroads from the Princes Highway and The Avenue.

== Geography ==
Mount Mangerton is the name of the hill on which Mangerton resides mostly. The hill is part of the Mangerton hill mass which also incorporates Mount Saint Thomas, a lower peak, south of Mangerton, see Coniston. The hill has good views of Wollongong and is directly south of Wollongong Hospital on the northern Hospital Hill. The hillmass is the reason the railway and highway, on different sides, had to curve rather than go in a direct line to Unanderra.

== History ==
The suburb was formerly known as 'Hospital Hill' because of its close vicinity to Wollongong's major hospital. Many of the doctors and their families lived in the suburb and to this day, the suburb remains home to many of the city's medical professionals.

The internationally famous music video director, Russell Mulcahy grew up in Mangerton.
