= Drummond Battery =

Coordinates: 34°26′21.11″S 150°52′31.78″E

- Part of Kembla Fortress
- Mount Saint Thomas, New South Wales
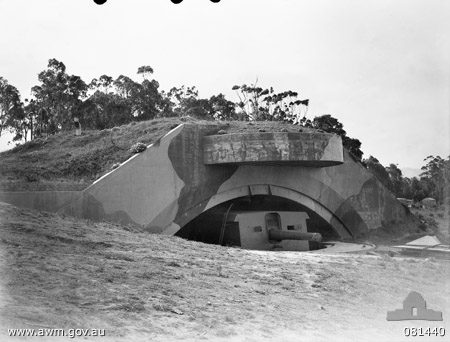
- No. 2 BL 9.2 inch gun in 1944

Site information
- Type: Coastal artillery position
- Owner: Australian Army (1942–1944); WIN Television (current)
- Operator: Fort Drummond Mushrooms (1966–1972)

Site history
- Built: 1942–1943
- Built by: Public Works Department and Department of Main Roads
- In use: 1942–1954?

Garrison information
- Garrison: 13th Garrison Battalion, 2nd Garrison Battalion, 12th Battalion VDC

Drummond Battery, also known as Fort Drummond, is a heritage-listed former coastal artillery fortification and now television station and mushroom farm at 1 Television Avenue, Mt Drummond, Mount Saint Thomas, City of Wollongong, New South Wales, Australia. It was built between 1942 and 1943 by the NSW Public Works Department and NSW Department of Main Roads. The Australian Army used the site from 1942.

== History ==
The first World War II Fort built to defend Port Kembla was Breakwater Battery, completed in September 1939 as a close defence and observation battery. In 1940, a Battery Observation Post for the Breakwater Battery was built on Hill 60 to the south, above Red Point. Illowra Battery was built in 1942 so that guns and associated fort were protected and concealed from the air with two tunnels driven into the sandy headland to house the gun personnel, kitchen, gun store, magazine, shell store, fire control equipment, telephone exchange and offices. The Battery Observation Post built in 1940 on the top of the knoll at Hill 60 for Breakwater Battery was converted to a fortress Observation Post. The Illowra Battery Observation Post was built in 1942, at the same time as the Fort tunnels were excavated. The Battery Observation Post function for the Illowra Battery moved to Berkeley Hill, and the Observation Post for Breakwater moved to the Gallipoli Street, Port Kembla (aka Bowling Club) site. At the same time, Observation/Radar sites were built at Mt Nebo and Dunsten Hill. Work also commenced on a counter bombardment battery at Fort Drummond on Mt St Thomas to the north west of Port Kembla. This battery required massive excavation for the gun foundations, magazines and underground rooms. Two 9.2-inch guns, Mark-X type, were installed using overhead gantry cranes. The guns were protected from air attack by bombproof concrete arches and camouflaged from the air by concrete aprons, which were grassed over. Tunnels were driven into the hillside to house the associated equipment needed to manoeuvre the guns, store ammunition as well as to accommodate the Fortress Plotting Room and personnel facilities. Above ground between the two gun emplacements is the Close Defence Battery Observation Post.

=== Mount Drummond and Mount St Thomas ===
The site of the fort, Mount Drummond was part of an estate believed to have been owned by J Drummond. The 300 acres owned by Drummond extended to Tom Thumb's lagoon. The Illawarra Mercury reported in 1923 that "Mt Drummond, or South Wollongong or Coniston which of these names will settle permanently on this locality is not definite." One objection to the name Mount Drummond was that there was already a mountain of that name in the County of Hardinge near Armidale. Mount St Thomas was believed to have been named for miss Jemina Thomas, wife of Captain Charles Waldron of Spring Hill.

=== Mount St Thomas Garden Suburb ===
Elliot's farm on Mount St Thomas was subdivided by Giddings & Co as the Mount St. Thomas Garden Suburb during the mid-1930s.

=== Fort Drummond ===
With the entry of Japan into the war, defence preparations accelerated. On 256 December 1941 a secret telegram was sent ordering the installation of additional coastal defences in the Newcastle-Sydney-Port Kembla area. NSW Command was to select the sites. Occupation of land around Mt Drummond was underway by 11 February 1942. Land was taken over for weapon pits, defensive wiring and the erection of tents. Occupation would last about 5 weeks.

Mount Drummond consisted of two hills with a saddle between them. The BOP was established on the higher hill to the north. The southern hill about 250 feet high became the location of the battery. The site was densely vegetated on some sides. However the ridge to the south-west was clear of timber and was recognised as vital ground for defence. At the top of the hill, where the battery was built, there were only a few houses and a dairy farm. A defensive line around the whole perimeter was set up to defend the battery against ground attacks. A two-storey brick house, No 6 Robertson Street, was taken over officially on 10 February 1942 for use as the Company headquarters and billet for B Company, 13 Garrison Battalion. Its kitchen was used to prepare food for up to 90 men. The army vacated the property on 11 August 1942.

A rapid decision was made to divert two 9.2" coastal guns intended for Darwin to the defence of Port Kembla on 13 March 1942. Mount Drummond was selected as the site for them in late March 1942 and a contour survey was under way to aid the siting of the guns. The guns were expected to arrive from Britain in early May and a party of 1 officer and 24 other ranks were assigned to Mount Drummond to prepare the ground. In mid-April 1942, a sum of 60,000 pounds was set aside to install the guns. On April 15 the Works Director of NSW reported that it would take 12 to 16 weeks to fully install the battery but that they could be ready for action within 4 weeks. Excavation could be commenced rapidly, and temporary protected platforms could be set up with temporary travelling gantry cranes to load shells and cartridges. A shell store was dispensed with initially since it was found that ammunition could be in recesses in the gun battery. Urgency was the overriding consideration. Concrete pours were delayed by the lack of plans and there was a furious exchange of telegrams, letters, correspondence in late April to expedite the production and dispatch of plans.

By August 1942, arrangements had been made to hire transporters from Yellow Express Carriers Ltd to shift the 9.2" guns from Melbourne to Port Kembla for the Mount Drummond battery. However the guns were so heavy that the transporters broke axles and universal joints on two occasions.

By mid-December 1942, the Mount Drummond battery had made extensive progress. The NSW Public Works Department had undertaken the excavation work over 24 hours. The concrete needed time to cure. Both guns were mounted, and in an emergency gun No. 1 could be fired. Both guns were proof fired on 15 March 1943, with concrete work halted for a time beforehand to ensure that no green concrete was damaged. By 12 July 1943, work on the Drummond Battery was largely complete except for a few minor items.

By February 9, 1943, the war situation had become less acute then previously thought so the garrison at Port Kembla was instructed to concentrate on anti-sabotage protection of fixed defences and to be positioned for mobilisation if the enemy commenced any action. The garrison consisted of the 2nd Australian Garrison Battalion and the 12th Battalion VDC.

A detailed map showing the defences of Fort Drummond including wire, weapon pits, machine guns and so on was drawn on 9 February 1943. On 6 May 1943, a specification was issued for two sets of two reinforced concrete buildings at what is now the WIN TV Station in Wollongong. This may have been for the Fort Drummond site.

A layout plan of 5 July 1943 showed the Battery Observation Post for Mount Drummond, at the end of Norman Street, near the Reservoir. Similarly a layout plan of Mount Drummond showing the position of buildings, including the two batteries, command post, armament store, command post, mess buildings, igloos etc. between Robertson Street and The Avenue was prepared on 13 July 1943. Photographs of the site taken in 1962 now held in Wollongong Library show a series of buildings above the northernmost gun emplacement. These buildings have been demolished.

In September 1943, it was minuted that AWC had advised that the works at Illowra were nearly complete. The work at Mount Drummond was also done but no Board of Survey inspection had been made. It was recommended that none be undertaken and this was accepted on 4 October 1943.

The Commonwealth did not formally acquire the site of the Fort Drummond Battery at Mount St Thomas until 6 July 1944 and 12 October 1944.

As threat receded the level of alert was downgraded. By 12 November 1944, mariners had been informed that Port Kembla was no longer a defended port.

Drummond Battery's guns were test fired on three occasions between March 1943 and September 1946. Four houses in the direct line of fire of the guns were demolished before the first test, with their owners being granted compensation. As of May 1947, another 44 householders were seeking compensation for damage caused to their homes by the gunnery exercises.

In 1946 the Mount Saint Thomas Progress Association removed a guard shed from Drummond Battery and installed it at a bus stop. It later transpired that this had been done without the necessary authorisation from the Army. In October 1951 the Army donated the structure to the Mount Saint Thomas Progress Association following representations from the local member of parliament.

Drummond Battery continued to be used by the Army in the years after World War II. For instance, the Citizen Military Forces 16th Coastal Artillery Battery undertook training there in September 1953. A Mount Drummond Auxiliary Battery existed in 1954.

=== Fort Drummond Mushrooms ===
A Dutch migrant Frank Smith Jnr who had previously worked at the AIS Steel plant (now BHP) established a mushroom farm at Fort Drummond in 1966. His farm operated until 1972. The Smith family arrived in Melbourne in 1952 and originally settled in Wauchope. By 1954 Frank Smith Jnr had moved to Port Kembla. The farm was known as Fort Drummond Mushrooms. This is the only known NSW example of a fort being used to farm mushrooms.

=== WIN Television ===
Part of the site of the Fort is occupied by WIN. This land was acquired in the early 1960s by Television Wollongong Transmission Ltd and their studios were constructed on part of the site of Fort Drummond. The station at the time was owned by Rupert Murdoch who later sold it to Bruce Gordon of Paramount International Television. Television Avenue, leading to the battery reflects this phase of use of the site.

These facilities are still in use today.

== Description ==
This coastal artillery complex, like the Breakwater Battery, was part of Australia's World War II defence strategy. It was constructed at a time when the growing use of air power had forced designers to plan underground facilities to protect the guns, ammunition and associated equipment and personnel. The two 9.2 inch (23 cm) guns were protected by massive reinforced concrete casemates. Each stage of the construction was carried out by a long uninterrupted pour so as to ensure structural continuity and therefore great strength. The underground complex was self-contained when used in action and included its own power supply, gun crew accommodation, water and filtered air supply. In March 1943 the guns were first fired.

Fort Drummond was built into the hillside, involving substantial removal of rock to allow for the construction of the battery and its underground facilities. Substantial excavation achieved by blasting away the hillside was undertaken in order to construct the battery. The two gun emplacements, which form the battery, were roofed with re-enforced concrete arches and painted to camouflage their location. See Wollongong City Library Image Collection for series of photographs of fort under construction.

Majority of above ground facilities have been removed. The archival records indicate large igloo stores were erected. An asphalt area survives that may have been the site of the igloo. Small corrugated iron buildings also survive, which have been partially destroyed by fire. A larger hip roofed building also survives, probably the mess building.

The external configuration of the gun emplacements is substantially intact.

As of 2020, no efforts had been undertaken to preserve the former Drummond Battery or develop it into a tourist attraction or educational site.

=== Modifications and dates ===
Guns removed, in 1962 other equipment was also removed.

== Significance ==
Fort Drummond
- Location within New South Wales
- Location: 1 Television Avenue, Mt Drummond, Mount Saint Thomas, City of Wollongong, New South Wales, Australia

History
- Built: 1942–1943

Site notes
- Architect: The plans were prepared in Melbourne

New South Wales Heritage Database (Local Government Register)
- Official name: Fort Drummond
- Type: Local Environmental Plan
- Designated: 7 January 2000
- Reference no.: 2700709
- Site type: Fortification
- Category: Defence
- Builders: NSW Public Works Department and NSW Department of Main Roads

As at 26 June 2014, Fort Drummond is a significant reminder of the threat to Australia's security during World War II. It was an integral part of the network of coastal batteries constructed to protect NSW's two major industrial areas, Newcastle and Port Kembla. As part of the Kembla Fortress, Fort Drummond was one of the three coastal batteries erected to protect the steel works lining the bay, all of which partially survive. The speed of construction of Fort Drummond indicates Australia's rapid response to the threat of invasion. The long-standing post war use as mushroom farm, established by a Dutch migrant, is also of significance as the only known example of the adaptive re-use of World War II gun emplacements for mushroom farming in the state. The use of the site for a TV station, reflects the clear view of Port Kembla and the good reception that could be gained from the hill.

The place is important in demonstrating the course, or pattern, of cultural or natural history in New South Wales.

Local – Associated with the coastal defences of NSW during World War II the speed on construction indicates Australia's rapid response to the threat of Japanese invasion. Known as the Kembla Fortress, Fort Drummond was one of the three coastal batteries erected to protect the steel works lining the bay, all of which survive.

The place has a strong or special association with a person, or group of persons, of importance of cultural or natural history of New South Wales's history.

Local – Associated with mushroom farming activities established by post war migrants from Holland.

The place is important in demonstrating aesthetic characteristics and/or a high degree of creative or technical achievement in New South Wales.

Local - The vista across the steel works and associated rail yard survives today

The place has strong or special association with a particular community or cultural group in New South Wales for social, cultural or spiritual reasons.

Local

The place has potential to yield information that will contribute to an understanding of the cultural or natural history of New South Wales.

Local – Considerable research potential related to its use as a coastal battery during WWII. Extensive photographic evidence of the construction of the facility survives.

The place possesses uncommon, rare or endangered aspects of the cultural or natural history of New South Wales.

Local – A rare example of a gun emplacement within a residential suburb. This battery is one of the most accessible batteries in the Newcastle to Wollongong defences. No identical layouts have been discovered. The only known example of gun emplacements being re-used for mushroom farming in the state.

The place is important in demonstrating the principal characteristics of a class of cultural or natural places/environments in New South Wales.

Local – Exhibit typical concrete construction used during World War II.

== Gallery ==
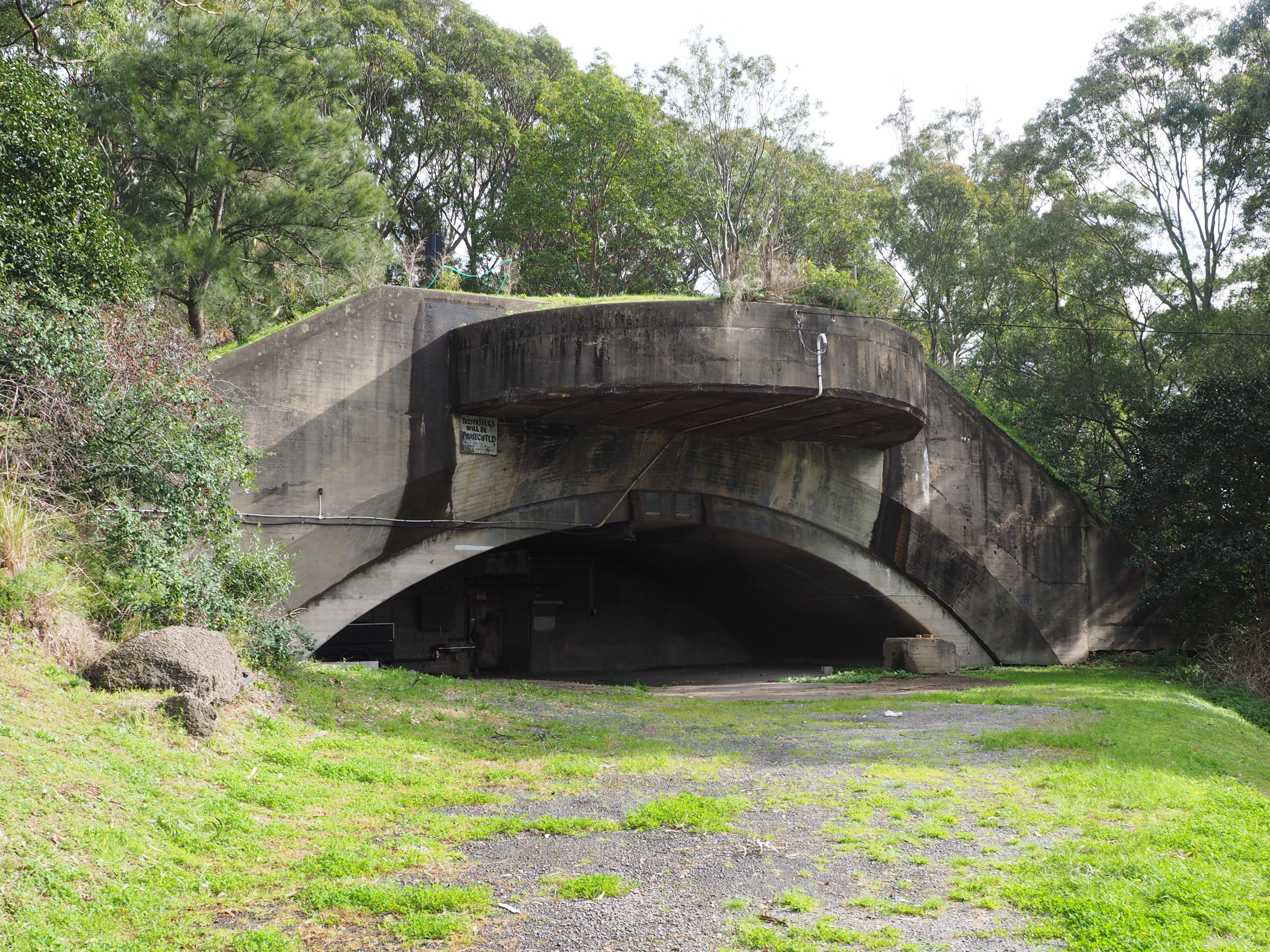
Gun emplacement 1 in 2020

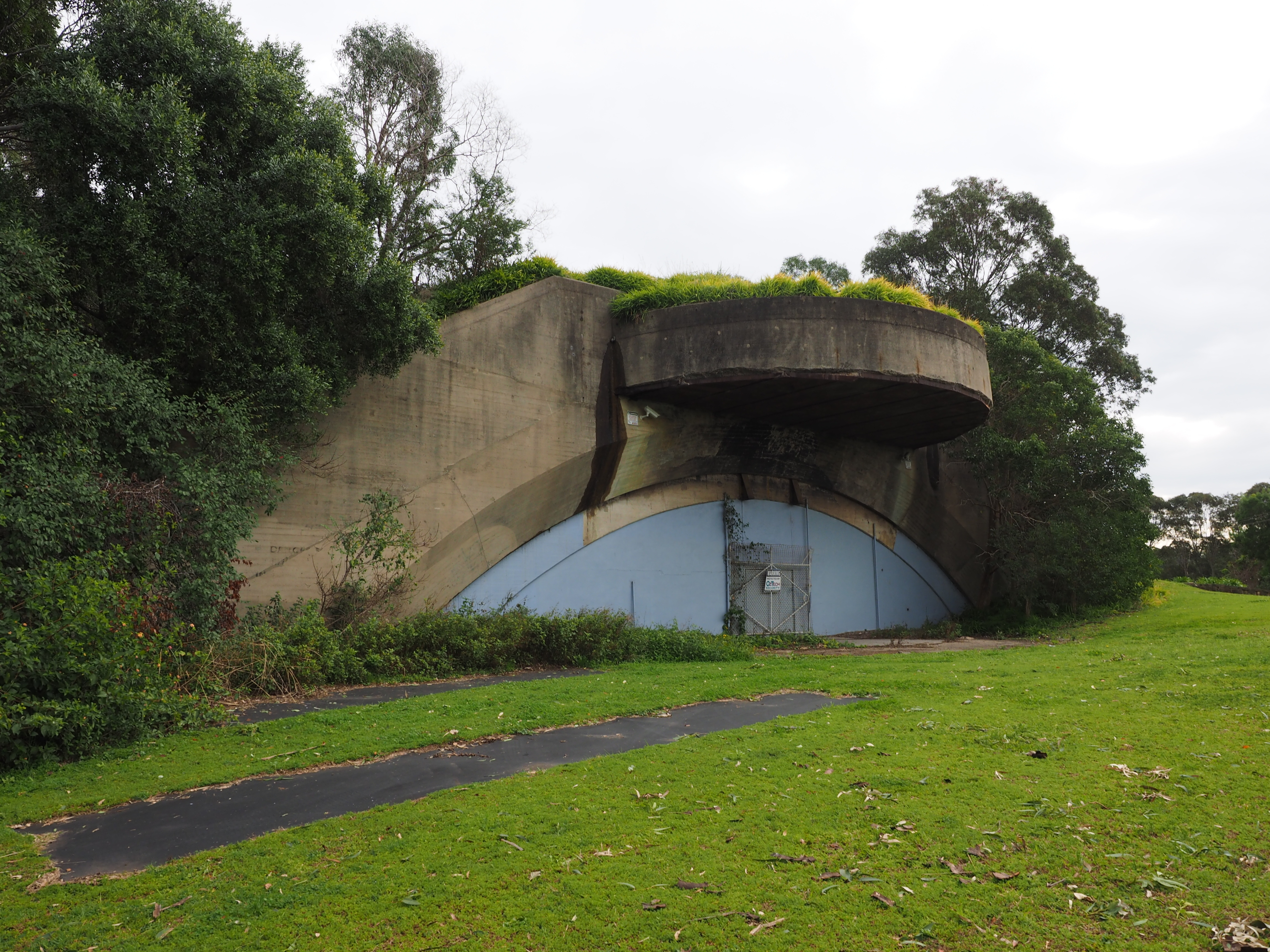
Gun emplacement 2 in 2020

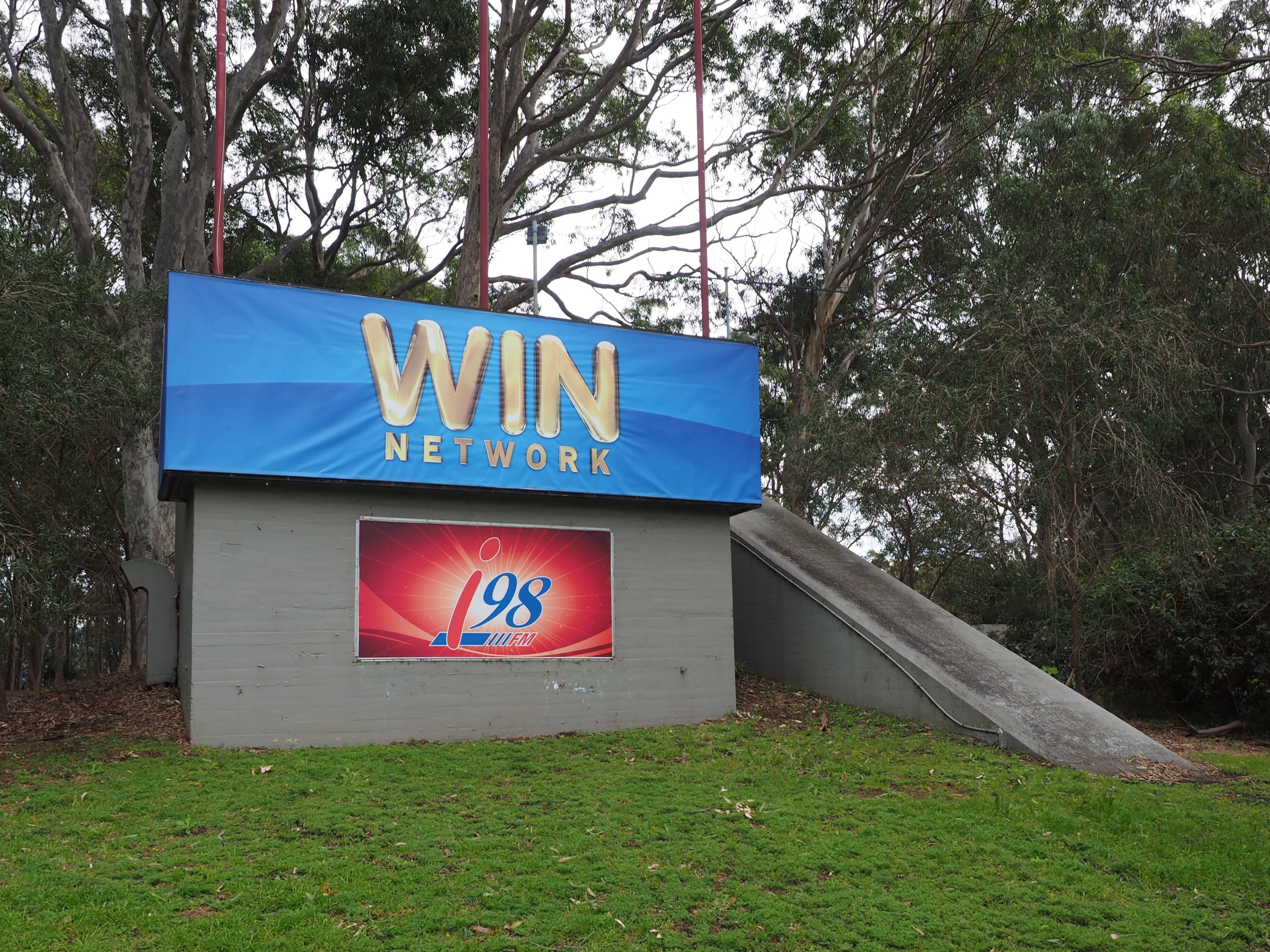
The battery's command post in 2020
