= Fernhill, New South Wales =

Fernhill Wollongong, New South Wales
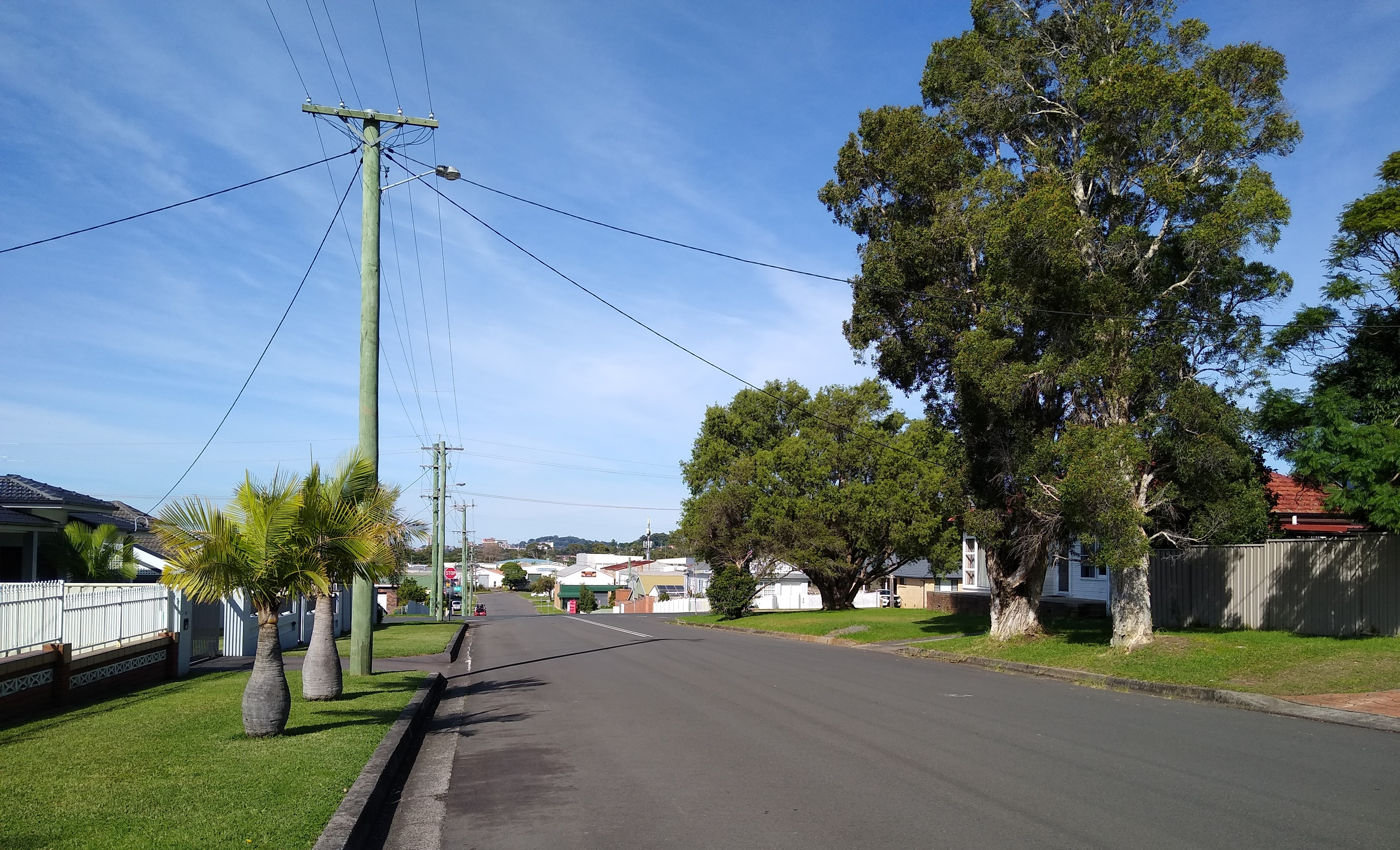
- Fernhill in 2022

- Coordinates: 34°23′07″S 150°53′25″E
- Population: 987 (2021 census)
- Postcode(s): 2518
- Elevation: 26 m (85 ft)
- Location: 79 km (49 mi) S of Sydney; 5 km (3 mi) N of Wollongong
- LGA(s): City of Wollongong
- State electorate(s): Wollongong
- Federal division(s): Cunningham
Suburbs around Fernhill:
Tarrawanna	Corrimal	East Corrimal
Balgownie	Fernhill	Towradgi
Mount Pleasant	Fairy Meadow	Fairy Meadow

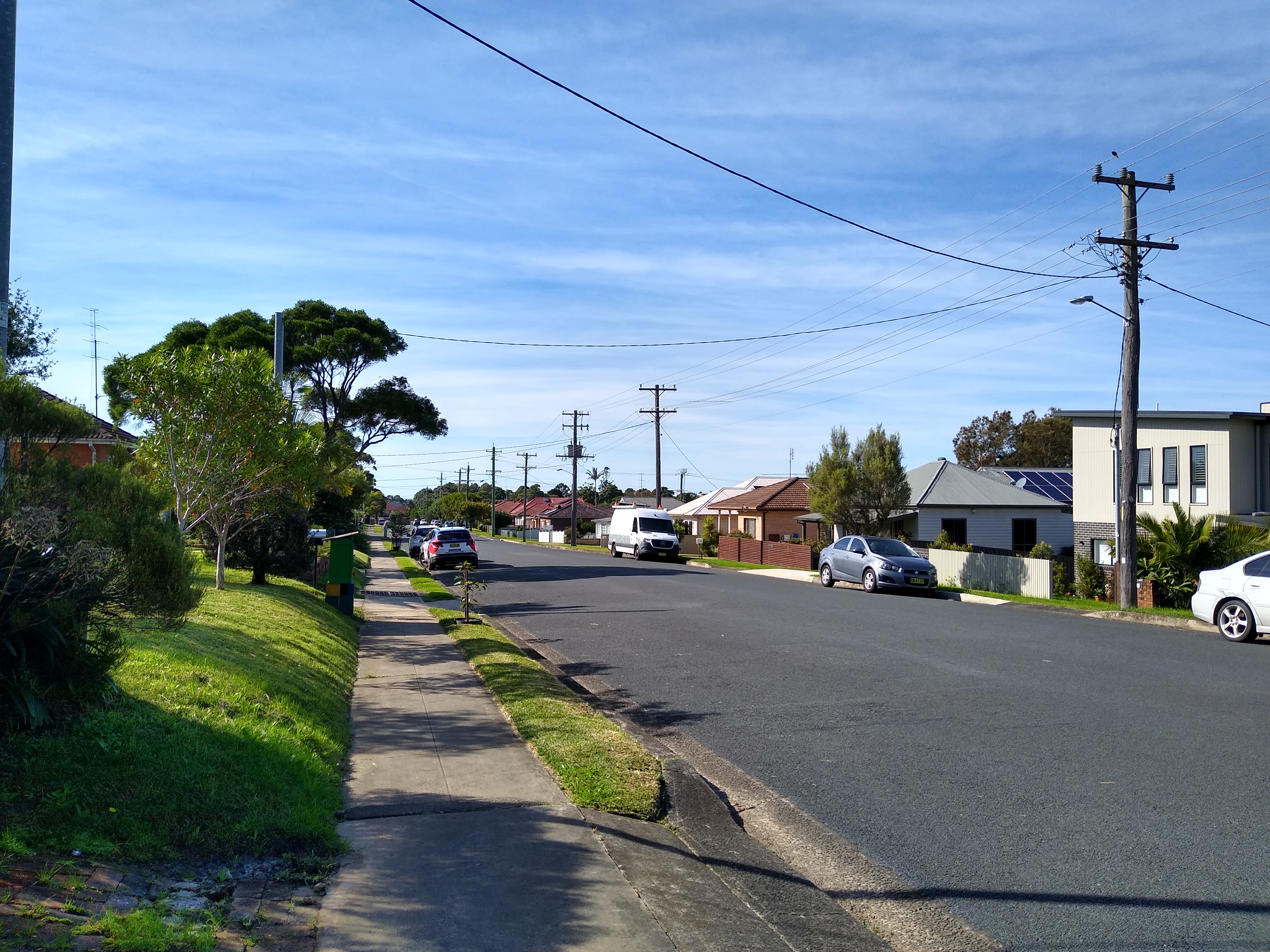
Fernhill

Fernhill is a suburb west of Towradgi, in the City of Wollongong. At the 2021 census, it had a population of 987.
