= Towradgi railway station =

Railway station in New South Wales, Australia

Towradgi
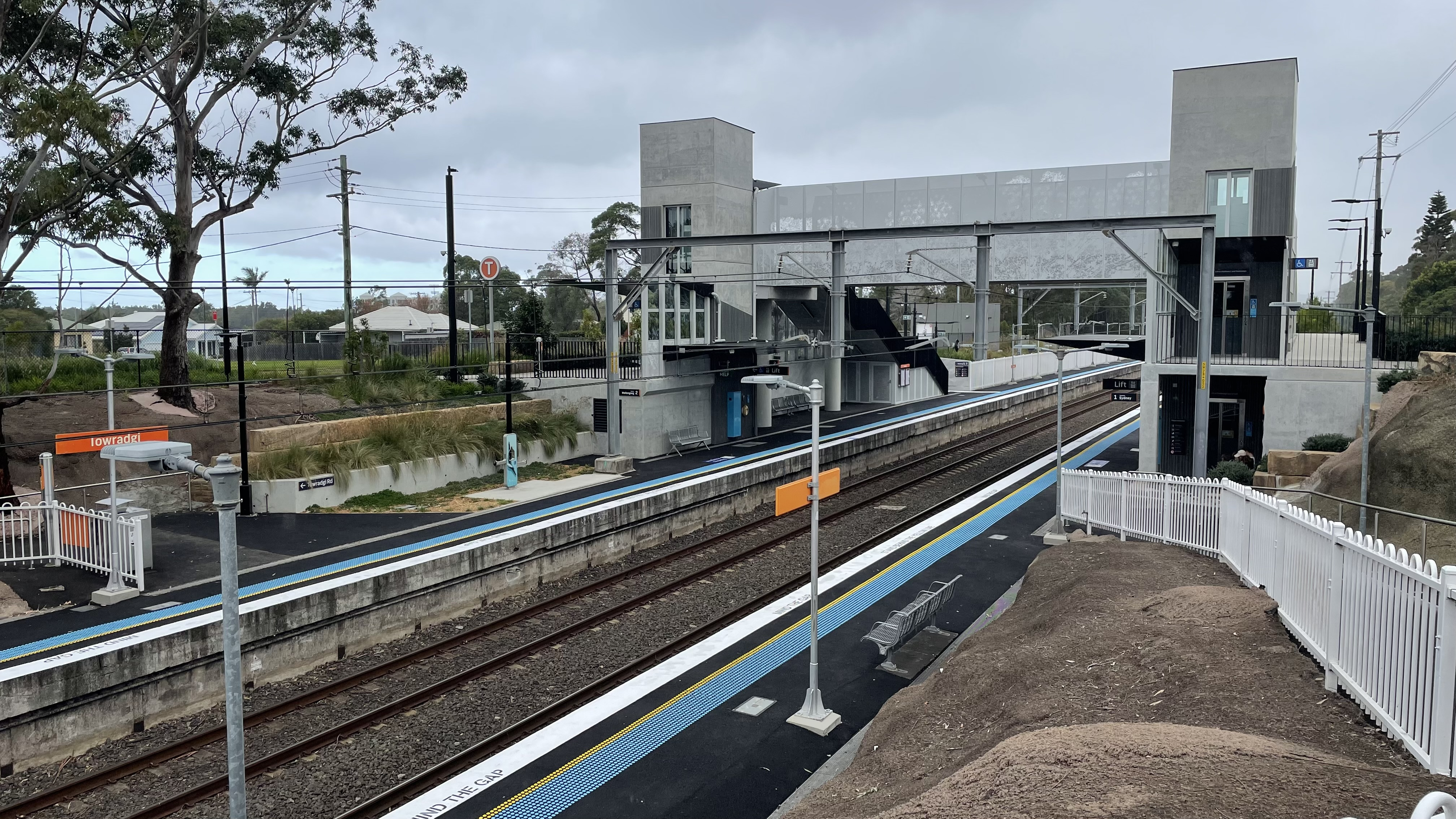
- Southbound view of Platform 2, just after access upgrade, June 2023

General information
- Location: Towradgi Road, Towradgi; Australia
- Coordinates: 34°23′03″S 150°54′05″E
- Elevation: 12 metres (39 ft)
- Owner: Transport Asset Manager of New South Wales
- Operator: Sydney Trains
- Line: South Coast
- Distance: 78.02 kilometres (48.48 mi) from Central
- Platforms: 2 side
- Tracks: 2

Construction
- Structure type: Ground
- Accessible: Yes

Other information
- Status: Weekdays: Staffed: 5.35am to 9.35am: Weekends and public holidays: Unstaffed
- Station code: TOW
- Website: Transport for NSW

History
- Opened: 18 December 1948

Passengers
- 2023: 38,590 (year); 106 (daily) (Sydney Trains, NSW TrainLink)

Services
Preceding station	Intercity Trains	Following station
Fairy Meadow towards Kiama or Port Kembla	South Coast Line	Corrimal towards Central or Bondi Junction
Location

Towradgi railway station is located on the South Coast railway line in New South Wales, Australia. It serves the northern Wollongong suburb of Towradgi and opened on 18 December 1948.

== Platforms and services ==
Towradgi Station has two side platforms serviced by Sydney Trains South Coast line services travelling from Waterfall and Thirroul to Port Kembla. Some peak hour and late night services operate to Sydney Central, Bondi Junction and Kiama.

An easy access upgrade was completed in May 2023, which saw construction of a lift on the middle of each platform, linked by a new footbridge.

Platform	Line	Stopping pattern	Notes
1	SCO	services to Thirroul & Waterfall peak hour & late night services to Sydney Central & Bondi Junction	
2	SCO	services to Port Kembla peak hour & late night services to Kiama	

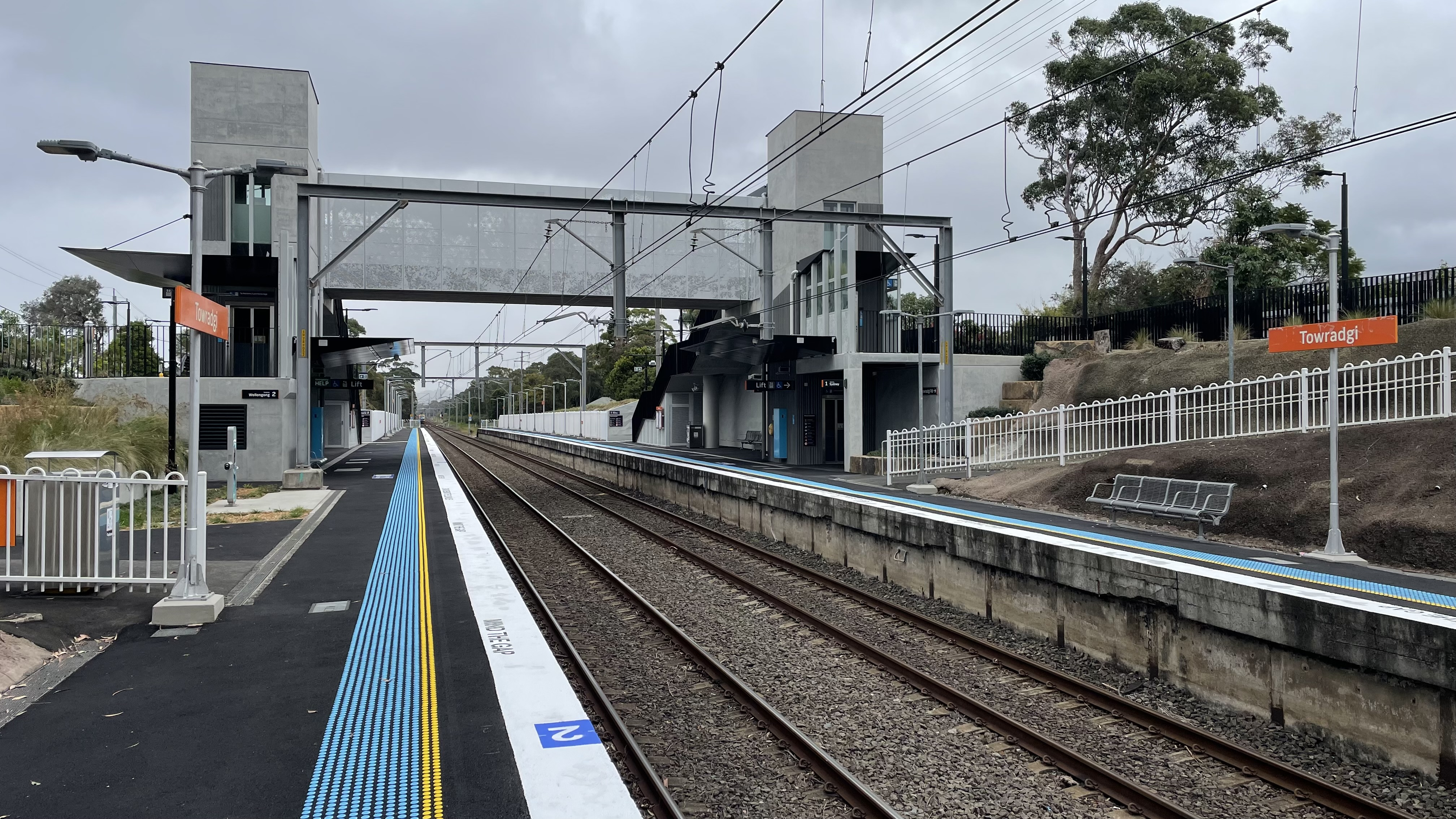
Looking south on platform 2

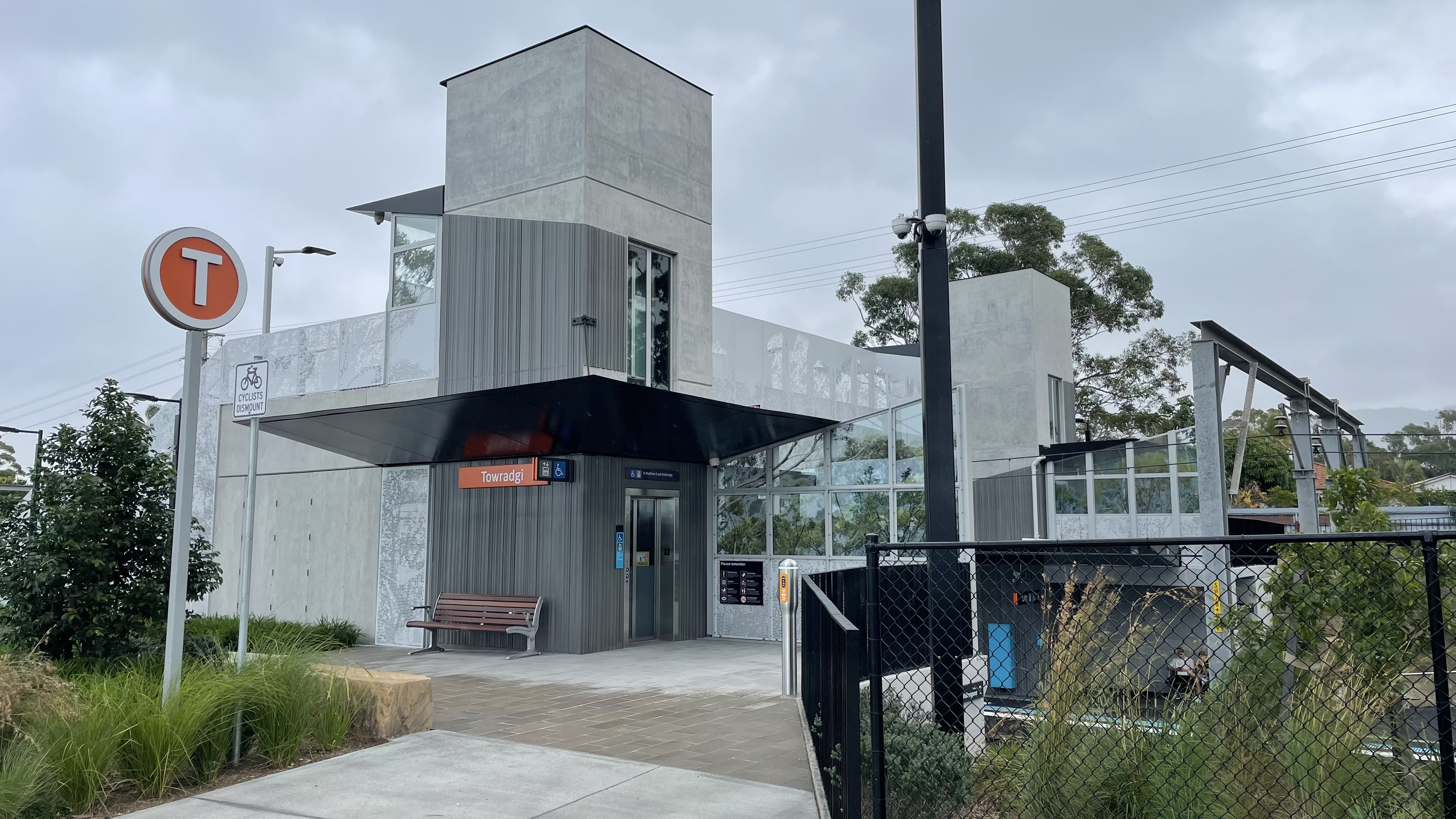
Entrance on Murray Road
