= Craig Young (rugby league) =

Australian RL coach and former Australia international rugby league footballer

Personal information
- Full name: Craig Albert Young
- Born: 25 June 1956 (age 70) Wollongong, New South Wales, Australia

Playing information
- Height: 183 cm (6 ft 0 in)
- Weight: 103.4 kg (16 st 4 lb)
- Position: Prop
Club
Years	Team	Pld	T	G	FG	P
1977–88	St. George Dragons	234	11	0	2	42
Representative
Years	Team	Pld	T	G	FG	P
1979–84	New South Wales	10	0	0	0	0
1978–84	Australia	20	1	0	0	4

Coaching information
Club
Years	Team	Gms	W	D	L	W%
1989–90	St. George Dragons	44	18	0	26	41
- Education: Corrimal High School
- Relatives: Dean Young (son)

Craig Young (born 25 June 1956) is an Australian former representative rugby league footballer for the Australia national rugby league team, the New South Wales Blues and a stalwart player over 12 seasons from 1977 to 1988 with the St. George Dragons in the NSWRL premiership competition. He played as a prop-forward. His nickname was "Albert" after his middle name and/or the cartoon character Fat Albert.

== Background ==
Young was born in Wollongong, New South Wales, Australia; and attended Corrimal High School.

== Early sporting success ==
Young had a strong grounding in the sport of soccer as a youngster and might have followed in his father's footsteps and turned professional (his father Bob Young represented Australia). His brother Warwick was a goalkeeper who played state league soccer for the Wollongong Wolves and for St George. At the age of 16, Craig was playing for Bellambi in the Illawarra soccer competition while he was also competing for Corrimal Cougars in rugby league. League eventually won the battle and Young was selected to tour Great Britain as an Australian Schoolboys team in 1972.

== Club career ==
Young's signature was chased by several clubs but the St. George Dragons eventually secured his services, and went on to become one of their greatest players. In his 1977 debut season coach Harry Bath claimed Young was destined for a great future and in that same year Young was instrumental in helping the Dragons take the premiership title, beating the Parramatta Eels in the grand final.

In 1979, Young was awarded captaincy of the Dragons' side and at 22 years of age led the side to its 15th title. He captained the side through tougher times up till 1988 including the 1985 Grand Final loss to the Canterbury Bulldogs.

In his final 1988 season he captained the Dragons when they won the mid-week 1988 Panasonic Cup competition, beating the Balmain Tigers 16–8.

== Representative career ==
He was selected for the 1978 Kangaroo Tour and played in all five Tests and eleven Tour matches. He was named "Player of the Tour".

He first represented for New South Wales in 1979, making five appearances under the old selection rules. He was selected for the Blues in the first ever State of Origin fixture in 1980 and made four further State of Origin appearances up till 1984.

In 1982 Young was named man-of-the-match in Australia's series-winning second test match against New Zealand.

On the 1982 Invincibles Kangaroo tour Young played in five of the six Tests as well as six Tour matches. His final national representative selection was at the Sydney Cricket Ground for the 1st test of the domestic Ashes series against Great Britain in 1984.

== Post-playing career ==
Young took up a coaching role at the Dragons in 1989 for two seasons until he was replaced by Brian Smith at the beginning of the 1991 season. He returned to the Dragons' coaching staff as recruitment manager in 2003.

Young along with his sons, Brad and Dean, own the Unanderra Hotel and Cabbage Tree Hotel. They purchased the Unanderra Hotel in 1991 (the year after Craig Young was sacked as coach of the Dragons) and The Cabbage Tree Hotel in 2008.

Since 2005, Young has had a role as team manager with the New South Wales Blues squads.

Young is the father of former Dragons hooker Dean Young, who played in the club's 2010 premiership team and later coached the club in 2020. Craig Young's wife Sharon died in 2016.

== Awards and accolades ==
Young was awarded Life Membership of the St. George Dragons in 1988.

While playing football, Young also served in the New South Wales Police Force and in 2008, rugby league's centenary year in Australia, he was named at prop in a NSW Police Team of the Century. On 20 July 2022, Young was named in the St. George Dragons District Rugby League Clubs team of the century.
