= Corrimal High School =

School in Illawarra region, New South Wales, Australia

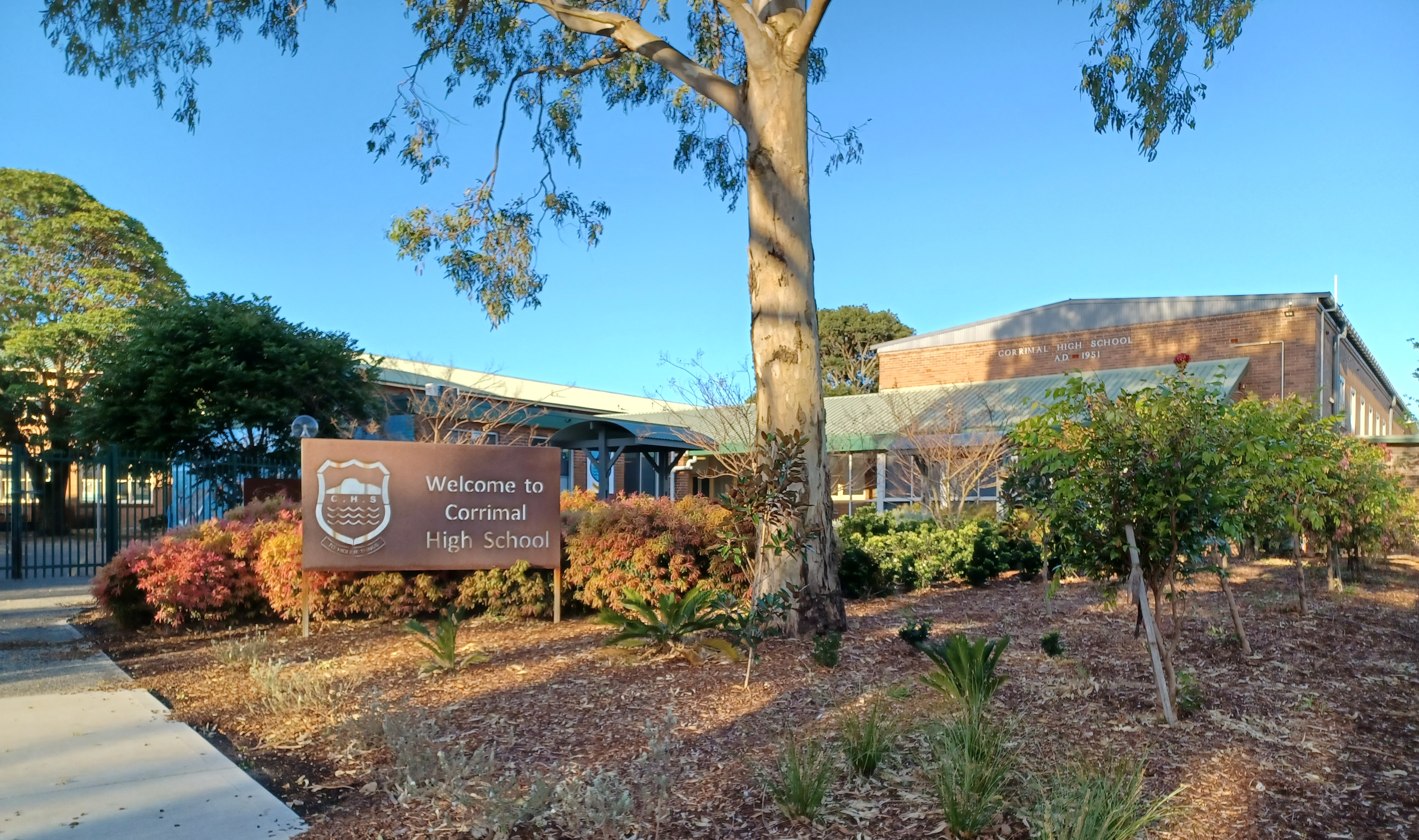

Location
- East Corrimal, Illawarra region, New South Wales; Australia; 34°22′33″S 150°54′37″E

Information
- Type: Government-funded co-educational comprehensive secondary day school
- Motto: Latin: Ad Altiora (To Greater Things)
- Established: 1951; 75 years ago
- School district: Wollongong North; Regional South
- Educational authority: New South Wales Department of Education
- Principal: Paul Roger
- Teaching staff: 42.3 FTE (2018)
- Enrolment: 320 (2018)
- Campus: Suburban
- Colours: Blue and grey
- Slogan: Aiming for excellence
- Website: corrimal-h.schools.nsw.gov.au

Corrimal High School is a government-funded co-educational comprehensive secondary day school located in East Corrimal, a suburb of Wollongong in the Illawarra region of New South Wales, Australia.

Established in 1951, the school enrolled approximately 320 students in 2018, from Year 7 to Year 12, including 17 percent who identified as Indigenous Australians and 20 percent who were from a language background other than English. The school is operated by the New South Wales Department of Education; and the principal is Paul Roger.

== History ==
The school was established in 1951.

In 2018, a fire destroyed the school's industrial arts building, which was rebuilt at a cost of $8 million as an industrial arts and technology building and reopened in 2022.

== Notable alumni ==
- Scott Chipperfield – soccer player; played with the Wollongong Wolves and the Socceroos
- Erin Hunter, soccer player; won Women's National Soccer League's Rising Star award playing for Northern New South Wales Pride in 2002
- Vince Jones – jazz trumpet player, singer and songwriter
- Russell Mulcahy – film director of movies such as Highlander and On the Beach as well as many music video clips
- Dr Reg Piper – former Anglican Bishop of Wollongong and a former assistant bishop in the Diocese of Sydney
- Craig Young – former rugby league football player; played with St. George Dragons, the NSW Blues, and the Kangaroos

== See also ==
- List of government schools in New South Wales: A–F
- List of schools in Illawarra and the South East)
- Education in Australia
