= Tarrawanna =

- Suburb
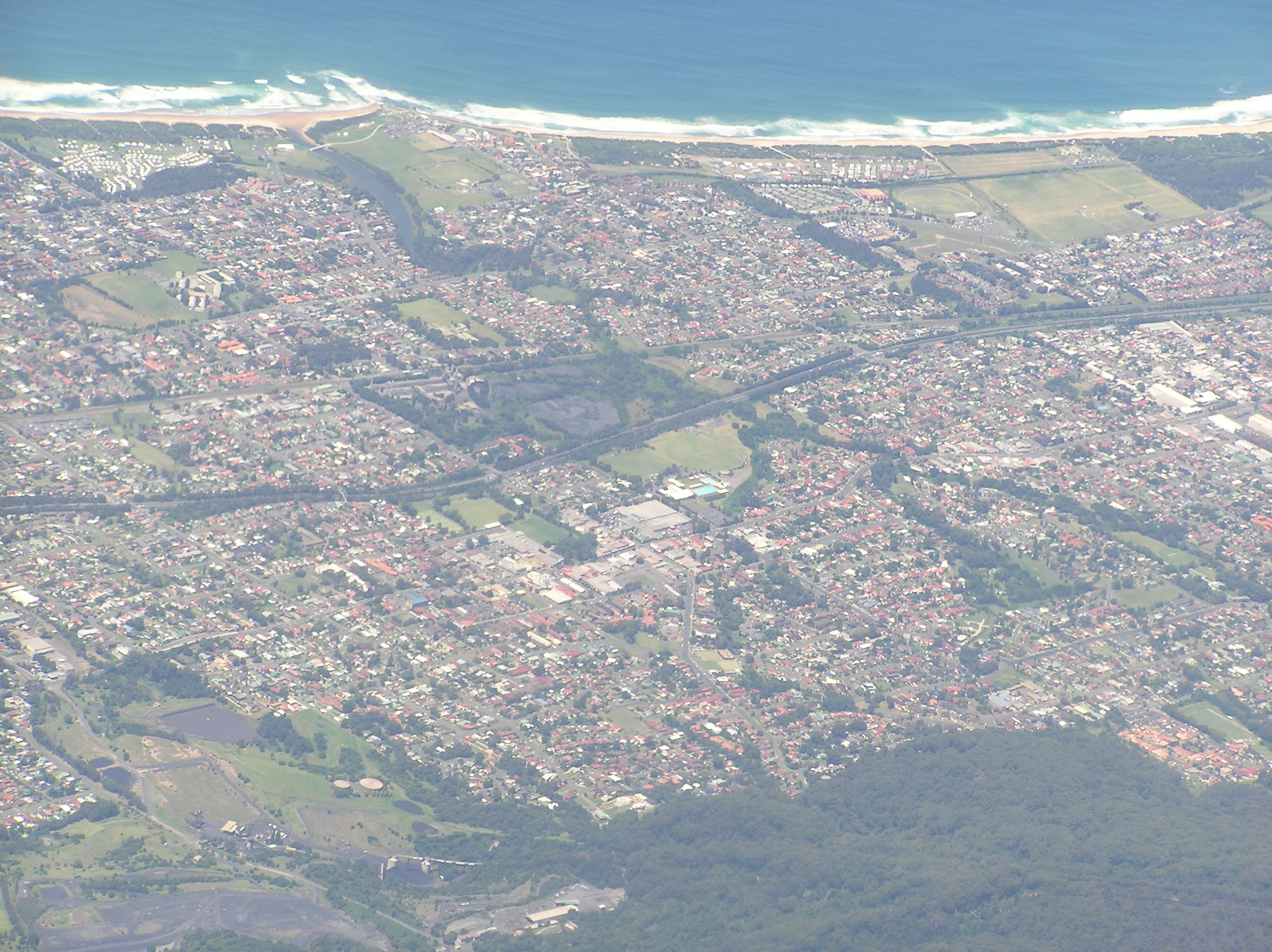
- Overlooking Tarrawanna (bottom right) and surrounding suburbs from the west.

- Coordinates: 34°22.7′S 150°53.3′E
- Country: Australia
- State: New South Wales
- City: Wollongong
- LGA: City of Wollongong
- Location: 78 km (48 mi) S of Sydney; 6 km (3.7 mi) N of Wollongong

Government
  - State electorate: Keira
  - Federal division: Cunningham
- Elevation: 21 m (69 ft)

Population
  - Total: 2,184 (2021 census)
- Postcode: 2518
Suburbs around Tarrawanna
	Corrimal	Corrimal
	Tarrawanna	Towradgi
Balgownie	Fernhill	Towradgi

Tarrawanna is a northern suburb of Wollongong, New South Wales, Australia, extending westward from the Princes Highway over the Illawarra Escarpment. Tarrawanna's main street Meadow Street has a few shops including cafes, a brewery, a Thai restaurant, a barber shop, a fish and chips shop and a grocer.

== Education ==
Tarrawanna has a primary school, Tarrawanna Public School on Kendall Street.

== Culture ==
The Australian stoner rock band Tumbleweed was formed in Tarrawanna in 1990.

Seminal Australian punk rock band The Proton Energy Pills named its 2003 anthology "Rocket To Tarrawanna" in honour of the suburb where its members lived and met.
