= Horsley, New South Wales =

Horsley
- Suburb
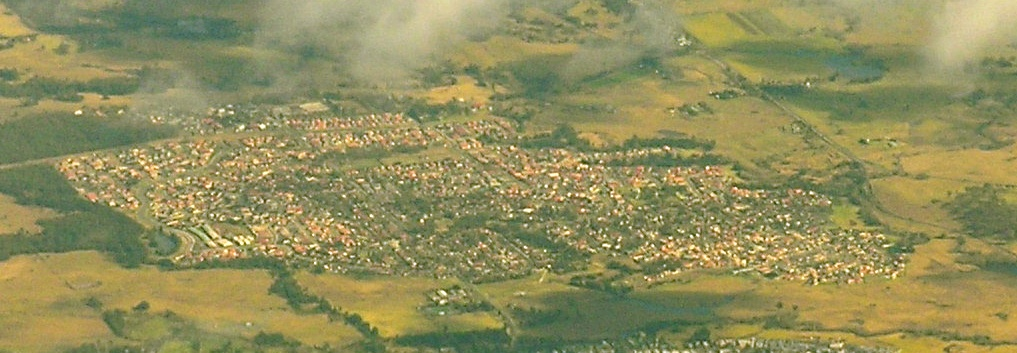

- Coordinates: 34°29′S 150°46′E
- Country: Australia
- State: New South Wales
- City: Wollongong
- LGA: City of Wollongong

Government
  - State electorate: Shellharbour
  - Federal division: Whitlam

Population
  - Total: 9,437 (SAL 2021)
- Postcode: 2530
Suburbs around Horsley
Wongawilli	Kembla Grange	Dapto
Huntley	Horsley	Dapto
Huntley	Cleveland	Dapto

Horsley is a suburb in Wollongong. It is the location of the new Dapto Primary school and a community centre. This suburb has expanded since 1999 and contains many newly developed houses.

== Geography ==
Horsley has a small shop area. It is surrounded by parkland, skatepark grounds and playing fields to the east (in the narrow area separating it from Dapto, and farmland to the north, west and south. West of Horsley is Mount Bong Bong, part of the Illawarra escarpment range and the Dapto cliffs, providing a towering backdrop. Much of the land about is the last remaining land available to housing developers and much growth is possible. There is a shooting range west of Horsley reached via Bong Bong Road.

== Demographics ==
As of the 2021 Census night there were 9,437 persons counted in Horsley, 49.1% identified as male and 50.9% identified as female. Of the total population 4.1% were of Indigenous origin. The previous Dapto primary school was moved to this suburb in 2004.

== Dapto Public School ==
The school used to be located on Byamee Street in the neighbouring suburb of Dapto. The school site is now on Sierra Drive, Horsley in a predominantly residential area.

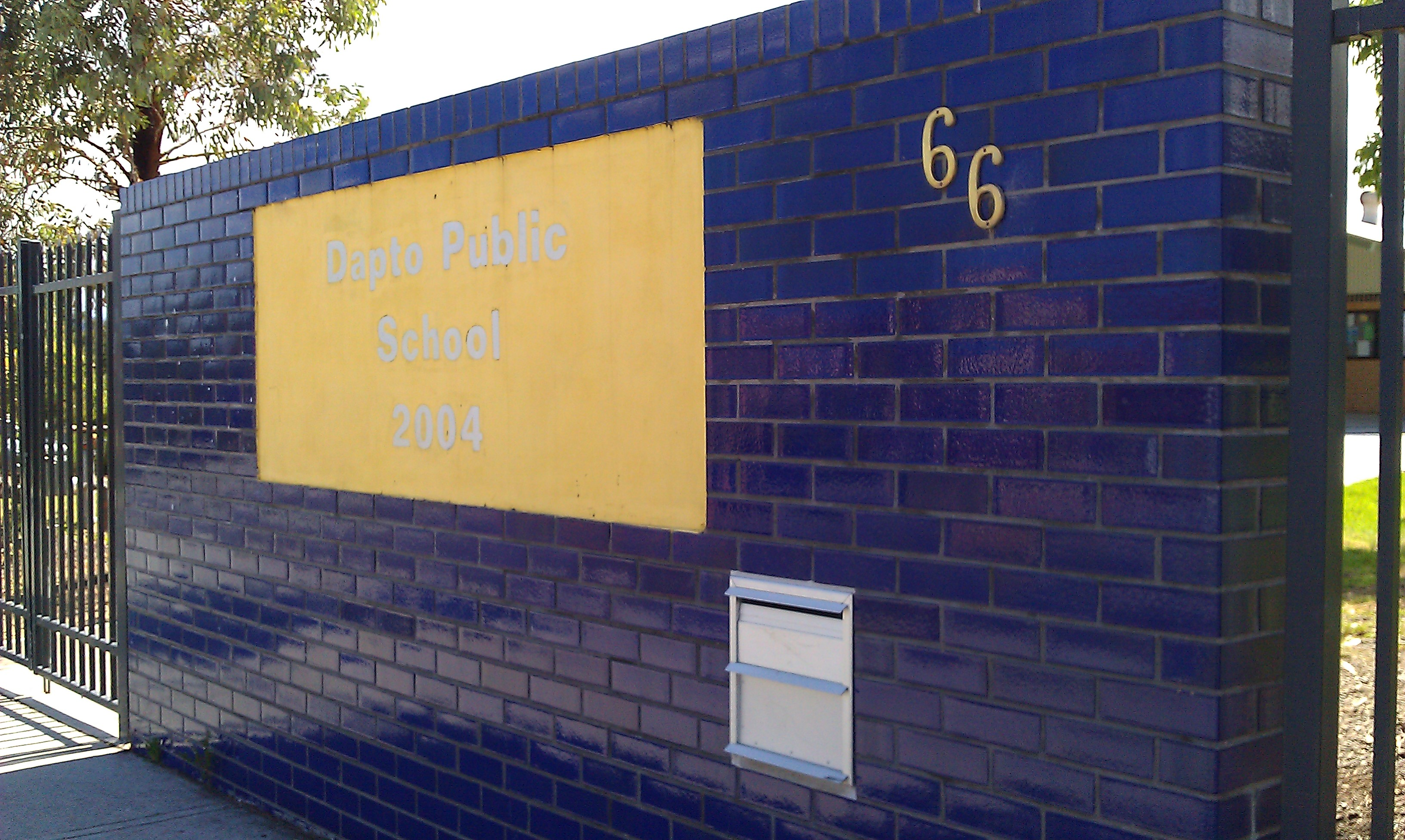
The school entrance

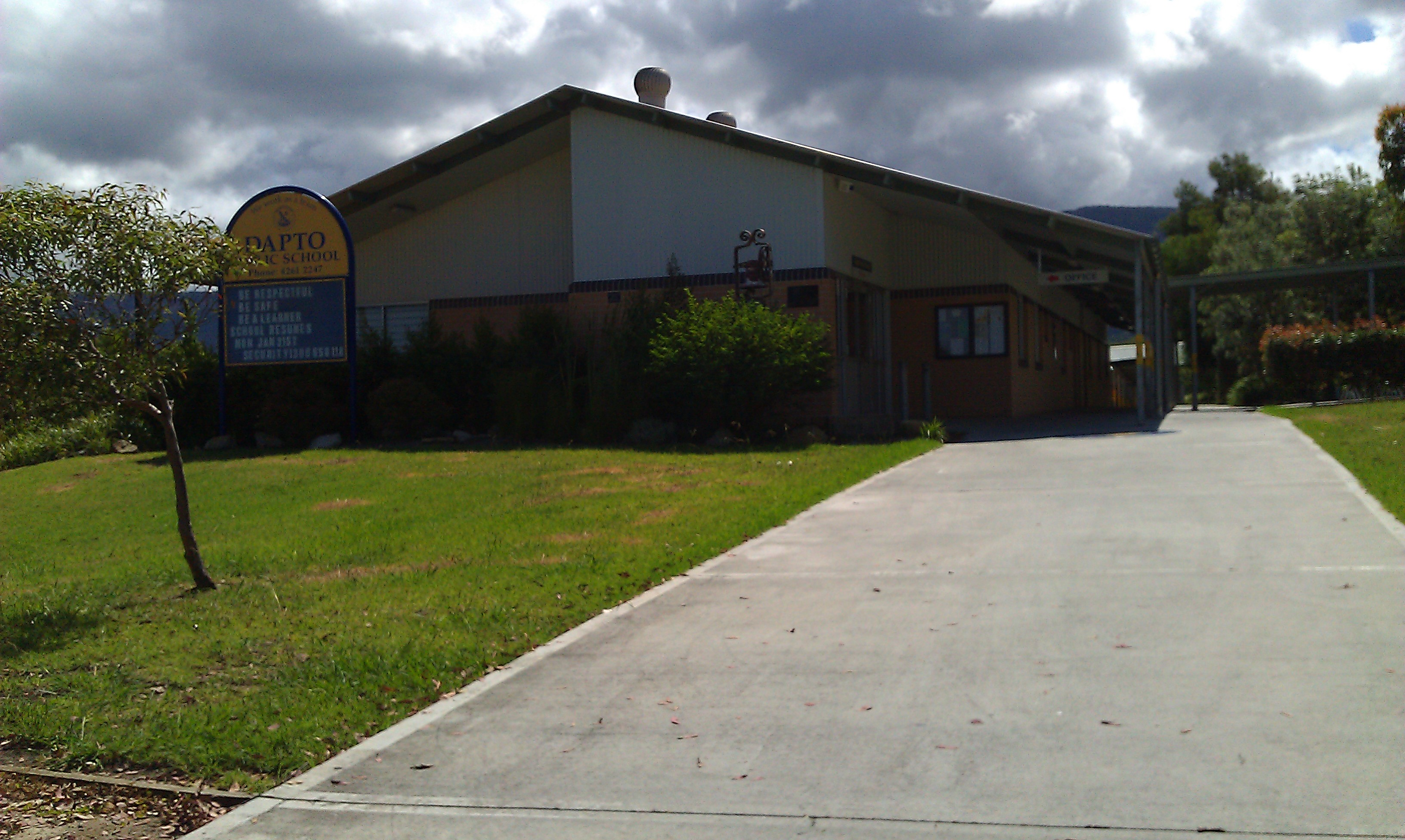
The administration office

== World War II aircraft crash ==
On 7 November 1942, a Royal Australian Air Force Lockheed Hudson crashed on Bong Bong Mountain, just west of Horsley, killing all four crew members.
