= Corrimal railway station =

Railway station in New South Wales, Australia

Corrimal
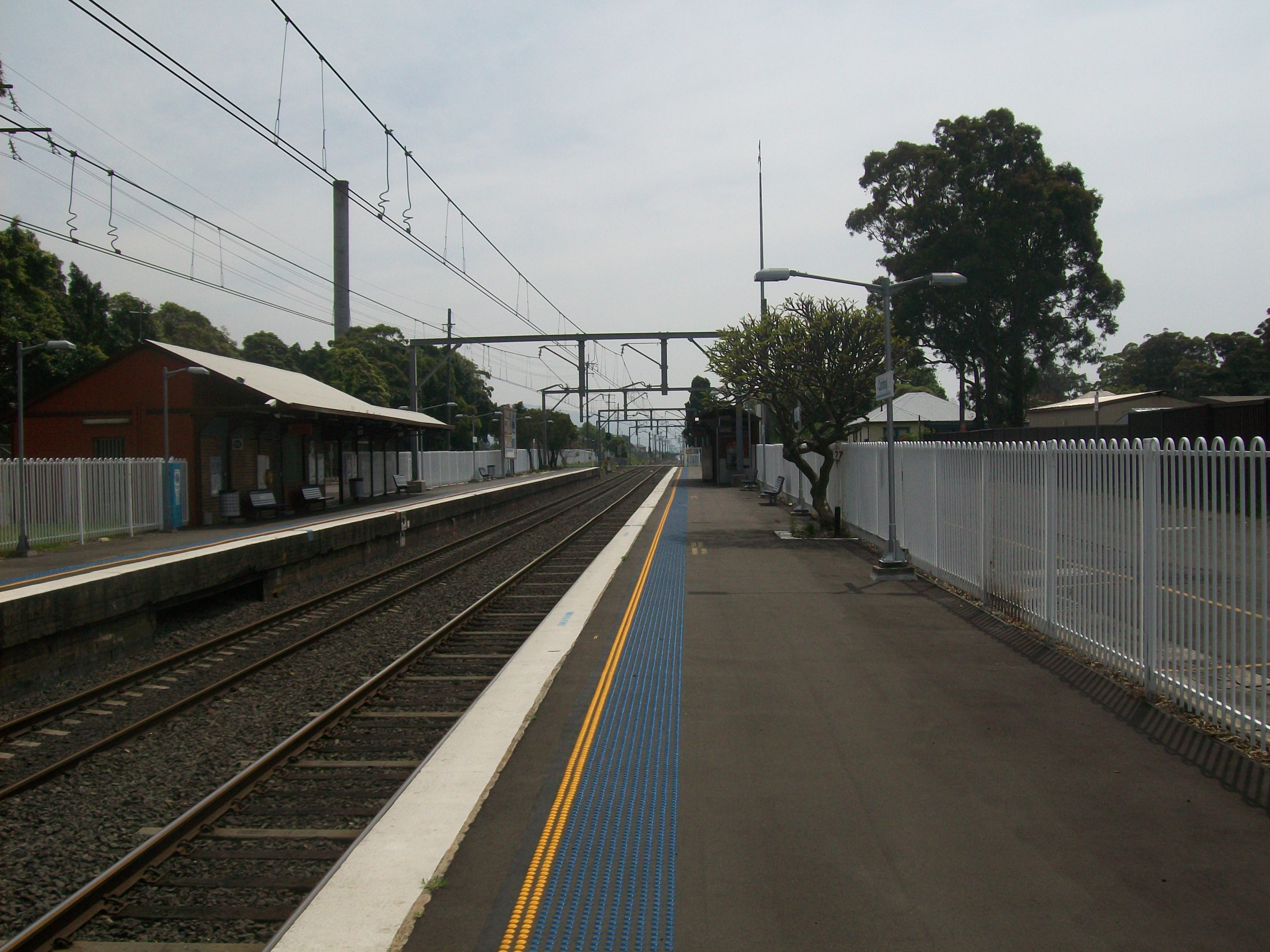
- Northbound view from Platform 2, October 2011

General information
- Location: Murray Road, Corrimal; Australia
- Coordinates: 34°22′32″S 150°54′18″E
- Elevation: 14 metres (46 ft)
- Owner: Transport Asset Manager of New South Wales
- Operator: Sydney Trains
- Line: South Coast
- Distance: 76.99 kilometres (47.84 mi) from Central
- Platforms: 2 side
- Tracks: 2

Construction
- Structure type: Ground
- Parking: Yes
- Accessible: Assisted access

Other information
- Status: Weekdays: Staffed: 5.35am to 9.35am, 2pm to 6pm: Weekends and public holidays: Unstaffed
- Station code: CIM
- Website: Transport for NSW

History
- Opened: 21 June 1887

Passengers
- 2023: 76,320 (year); 209 (daily) (Sydney Trains, NSW TrainLink)

Services
Preceding station	Intercity Trains	Following station
Towradgi towards Kiama or Port Kembla	South Coast Line	Bellambi towards Central or Bondi Junction
Location

Corrimal railway station is located on the South Coast railway line in New South Wales, Australia. It serves the Northern Wollongong suburb of Corrimal and opened on 21 June 1887.

== Platforms and services ==
Corrimal has two side platforms serviced by Sydney Trains South Coast line services travelling from Waterfall and Thirroul to Port Kembla. Some peak hour and late night services operate to Sydney Central, Bondi Junction and Kiama.

Platform	Line	Stopping pattern	Notes
1	SCO	services to Thirroul & Waterfall peak hour & late night services to Sydney Central & Bondi Junction	
2	SCO	services to Port Kembla peak hour & late night services to Kiama	

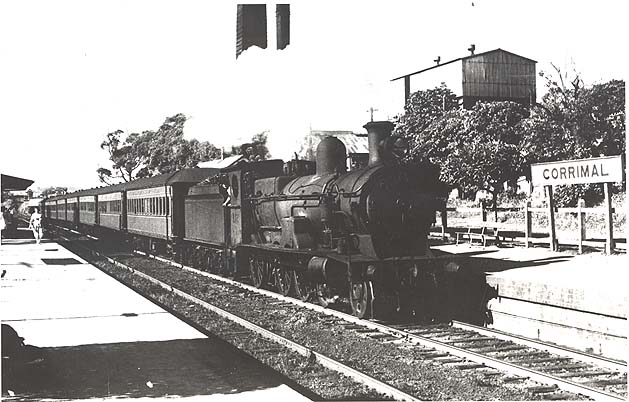
The station c.1960
