= Koonawarra =

- Suburb
- Coordinates: 34°30.1′S 150°48.5′E
- Country: Australia
- State: New South Wales
- Region: Illawarra
- City: Wollongong
- LGA: City of Wollongong
- Location: 97 km (60 mi) SSW of Sydney; 16 km (9.9 mi) SW of Wollongong; 25 km (16 mi) N of Kiama

Government
  - State electorate: Shellharbour
  - Federal division: Whitlam
- Elevation: 16 m (52 ft)

Population
  - Total: 3,732 (2021 census)
- Postcode: 2530
- County: Camden
- Parish: Calderwood
Suburbs around Koonawarra
Dapto	Kanahooka	Kanahooka
Dapto	Koonawarra	Lake Illawarra
Dapto	Yallah	Lake Illawarra

Koonawarra is a suburb of Wollongong, New South Wales, Australia. It is located on the western shore of Lake Illawarra. Koonawarra, or Exmouth, as it was then called, was one of the first five land grants located in the Illawarra. It was a grant of 1300 acres made to Richard Brooks in 1817. The grant faced Lake Illawarra and extended from Brook's Creek to Mullet Creek. Koonawarra was the aboriginal name for the area. "Exmouth" was later secured by Henry Osborne and became part of his central Illawarra estate, extending from Macquarie Rivulet to Mullet Creek, and from Lake Illawarra to the mountains. The name Koonawarra is from the aboriginal word "Koonawarra” meaning "swan".
