= Brokers Nose =

Point in the Illawarra Range, New South Wales, Australia

Brokers Point
- Brokers Nose, Corrimal or Brokers Peak
- Location within New South Wales

Highest point
- Elevation: 440 m (1,440 ft)
- Coordinates: 34°21′55″S 150°52′34″E

Geography
- Location: New South Wales, Australia
- Parent range: Illawarra

Brokers Point or Brokers Nose or Corrimal Peak or Brokers Peak, is a point on the Illawarra Range, in the state of New South Wales, Australia.

== Location and features ==
With an elevation of approximately 440 metres (1,440 ft) above sea level, Brokers Nose, as it is more commonly known as, is located about 3 kilometres (1.9 mi) west of Corrimal and about 5 kilometres (3.1 mi) south-west of Bulli. At its summit, there is a transmission tower for primary networks of digital television. There is a dry-weather track leading to the top which starts from a small car park on the east side of Mount Ousley Road. Both track and summit are open to the public; the summit is protected as part of the Illawarra Escarpment State Recreation Area.

== Etymology ==
The name is vague in its origins and there are two possible explanations for it. One tells that an early settler named Brooker was the origin, the second that poor miners would take their families up to the summit for picnics, and they were brokers (poor people).

== See also ==
- List of mountains in Australia § New South Wales
- List of geographical noses
