= Brownsville, New South Wales =

Brownsville Wollongong, New South Wales
- Coordinates: 34°29′00″S 150°48′37″E
- Population: 524 (SAL 2021)
- Postcode(s): 2530
- Elevation: 6 m (20 ft)
- Location: 92 km (57 mi) SSW of Sydney; 12 km (7 mi) SW of Wollongong; 28 km (17 mi) N of Kiama
- LGA(s): City of Wollongong
- Region: Illawarra
- County: Camden
- Parish: Calderwood
- State electorate(s): Shellharbour
- Federal division(s): Whitlam
Suburbs around Brownsville:
Kembla Grange	Kembla Grange	Kembla Grange
	Brownsville
Dapto	Kanahooka	Kanahooka

Brownsville is a suburb of the City of Wollongong.

Brownsville was the location of the first settlement at Dapto. With the construction of the South Coast railway, Dapto developed around the railway station, which was further south. Brownsville was named after George Brown who received a grant of 300 acres, south of Mullet Creek, in 1833. His "Ship Inn" became the centre of the farming community.
