= Dapto =

Suburb in New South Wales, Australia

- Suburb
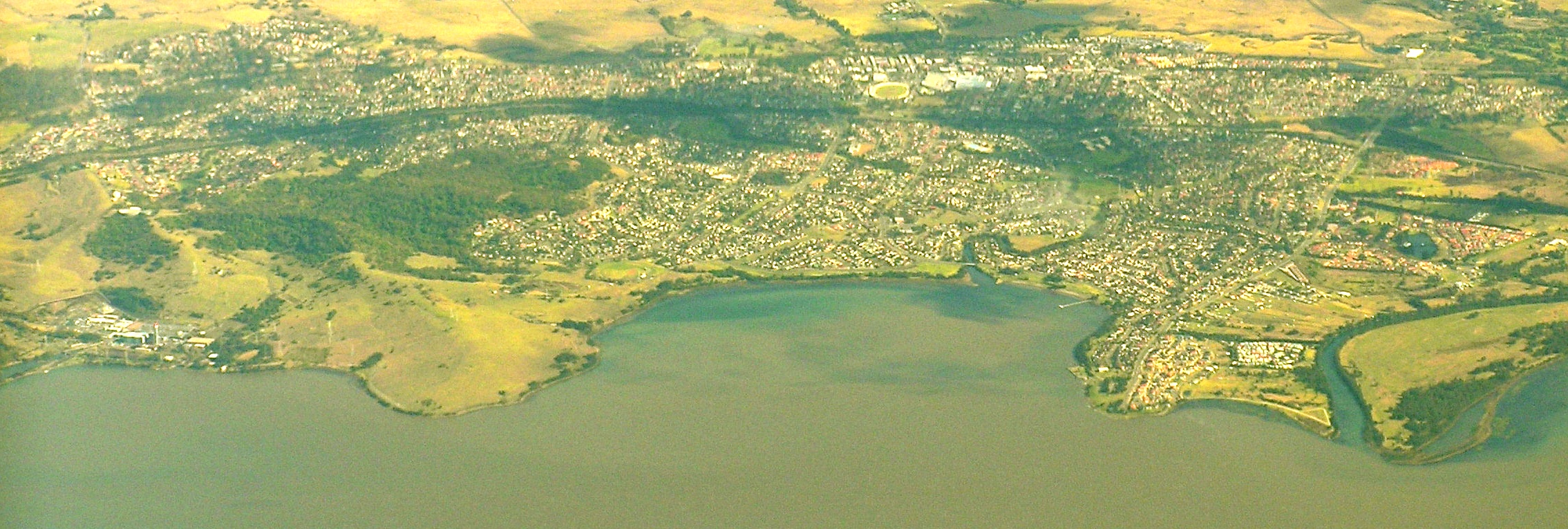

- Coordinates: 34°29.5′S 150°47.5′E
- Country: Australia
- State: New South Wales
- Region: Illawarra
- City: Wollongong
- LGA: City of Wollongong
- Location: 94 km (58 mi) SSW of Sydney; 14 km (8.7 mi) SW of Wollongong; 25 km (16 mi) NNW of Kiama

Government
  - State electorate: Shellharbour
  - Federal division: Whitlam
- Elevation: 17 m (56 ft)

Population
  - Total: 10,954 (SAL 2021)
- Postcode: 2530
- County: Camden
- Parish: Calderwood
Suburbs around Dapto
Kembla Grange	Brownsville	Kanahooka
Horsley	Dapto	Koonawarra
Cleveland	Yallah	Yallah

Dapto is a suburb of Wollongong in the Illawarra region of New South Wales, Australia, located on the western side of Lake Illawarra and covering 7.15 square kilometres (2.76 sq mi). As at the 2021 census, the suburb had a population of 10,954.

== History ==
The name Dapto is said to be an Aboriginal word either from Dabpeto meaning "water plenty", or from tap-toe which described the way a lame Aboriginal elder walked. The suburb was officially founded in 1834, when George Brown transferred the Ship Inn from Wollongong to Mullet Creek Farm, in an area now named in his honour as Brownsville. After an unsuccessful attempt at wheat growing in the 1850s, Dapto embraced the dairy industry. In 1887, the railway opened, and a butter factory was established. This began a transformation of Dapto and the town centre shifted south to where the new station was located. The Australian Smelting Company's works were established on Kanahooka Road and employed over 500 men. A railway, operated by the Illawarra Harbour and Land Corporation Limited, connected the smelter with the Government railway at Dapto.

== Population ==
According to the 2021 census, there were 10,954 people in Dapto.

- Aboriginal and Torres Strait Islander people made up 4.9% of the population.
- 81.0% of people were born in Australia. The next most common countries of birth were England 5.3%, New Zealand 1.0%, Scotland 0.8%, the Philippines 0.7% and North Macedonia 0.5%.
- 89.6% of people spoke only English at home; the next most common languages spoken at home were Macedonian 0.7%, Spanish 0.6%, Arabic 0.4%, Italian 0.4% and Serbian 0.4%.
- The most common responses for religion were No Religion 40.6%, Catholic 21.8% and Anglican 17.3%; a further 4.6% elected not to disclose their religion.

== Land use ==
On Koonawarra Point is Mount Brown Reserve, a hill protected by a nature reserve for its important habitat.

== Transport ==
The South Coast line electric rail service terminated in Dapto prior to electrification being extended to Kiama in 2001.

== Sport ==
The Dapto Canaries compete in the local Illawarra Rugby League.

== Education ==
The suburb has one high school, Dapto High School.

== Dapto in popular culture ==
Dapto was mentioned in The Aunty Jack Show, as a parody of the lyrics of the Lucky Starr song "I've Been Everywhere" were changed so that, instead of listing a wide range of Australian towns, the song said "I've been to Wollongong, Wollongong, Wollongong, Wollongong,... Wollongong, Wollongong, Dapto, Wollongong".

In a bizarre alternate universe, Dapto is the main setting for the adult animated television series Koala Man that premiered on Hulu in the US and Disney+ in Australia on 9 January 2023. The series takes place in an alternate universe where the sinking of the Titanic was averted, indirectly resulting in the United States of America being destroyed (except Hollywood becoming an island), Australia becoming the world's superpower, and Nicole Kidman becoming its Queen. Creator Michael Cusack was born and raised in Dapto

The animated YouTube series Damo and Darren is set in locations inspired by real places in the Dapto area, where creator Michael Cusack was born and raised. Damo and Darren' depicts the daily tribulations of two eponymous local 'deros', who spend their days visiting skateparks (including one inspired by the Unanderra skatepark), train stations (with similar appearance to Dapto railway station), and local Centrelink services.

== Notable people ==
- Bill Beach, rower
- Michael Cusack, animator, creator of Smiling Friends, YOLO, Koala Man, and Damo and Darren
- Zac De Jesus, soccer player
- Bobby Dimond, rugby league player
- Peter Dimond, rugby league player
- Brian Johnson, rugby league player
- Steve Kilbey, singer-songwriter
- John Makin AKA the Hatpin Murderer was a 'baby farmer' convicted for murder in 1892
- Paul McGregor, former rugby league player
- Fred Moore, activist
- Herbert Swan, politician
- Shannon Wakeman, rugby league player
- Ryan Park, Member for Keira, Minister for Health, Minister for Regional Health, and Minister for the Illawarra and the South Coast

== See also ==
- Dapto railway station
- Scrapbooking Delights (art and craft space)
