= Avon, New South Wales =

Locality in New South Wales, surrounding the river of the same name

Coordinates: 34°25′30″S 150°40′10″E

Avon is a suburb of the City of Wollongong and Wingecarribee Shire, both in New South Wales, Australia. It is "a locality within Metropolitan Catchment Area on the western side of Illawarra Range about 4km west of Wongawilli and about 5km north west of Avondale". At the 2021 census, it had no population.

== Heritage listings ==
Avon has a number of heritage-listed sites, including:

- Avon Dam Road: Avon Dam
- Avon Dam Road: Nepean Dam
