= Spring Hill, New South Wales (Wollongong) =

Suburb of Wollongong

Spring Hill is a locality north west of Port Kembla, New South Wales, in the Wollongong local government area, in the Illawarra region. It uses the postcode 2500.
