= North Beach Precinct =

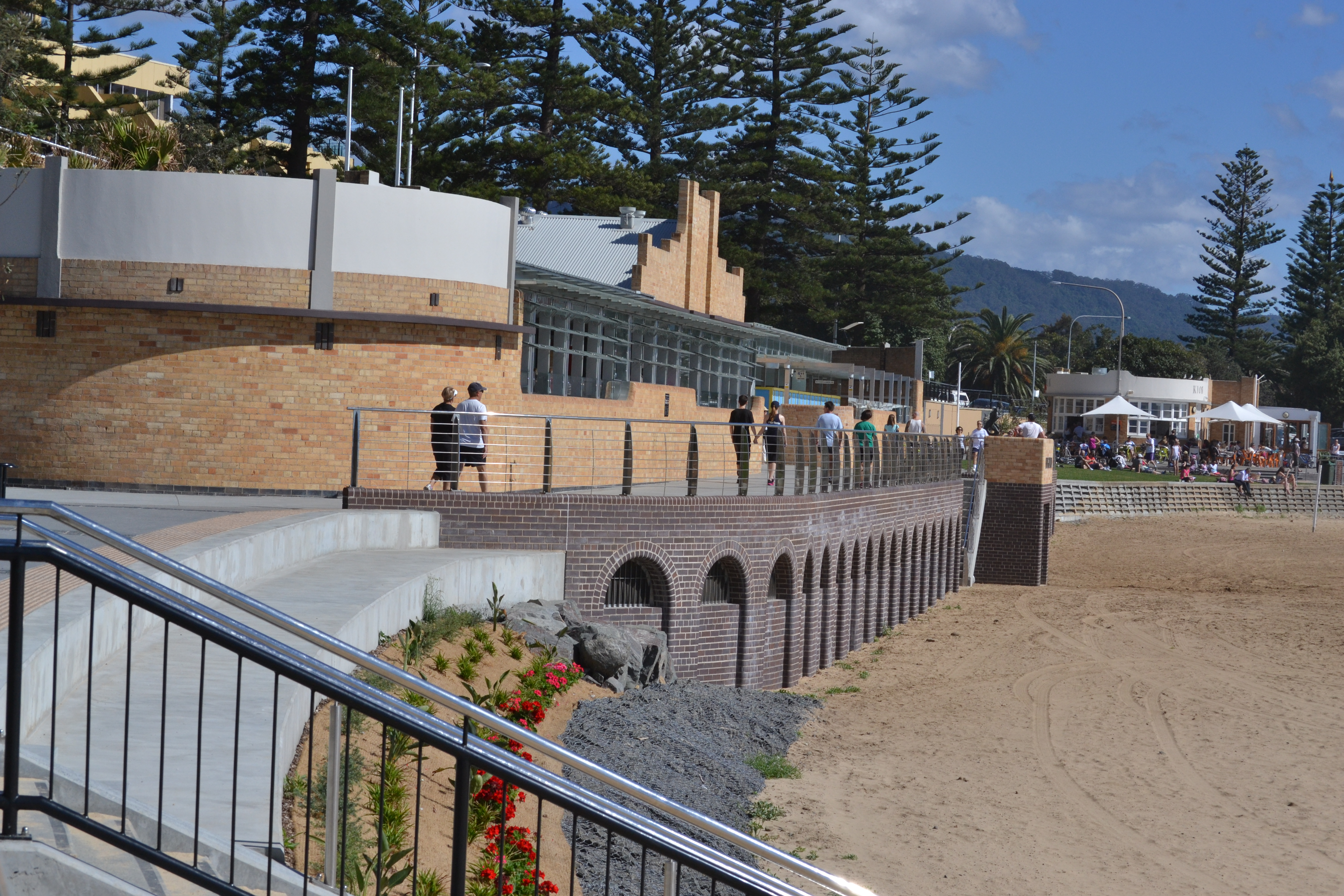

- Location within New South Wales Location within Australia
- 34.4149°S 150.9014°E
- Location: Cliff Road, North Wollongong, City of Wollongong, New South Wales, Australia

History
- Built: 1938–1938

Site notes
- Architect: Harvey Ennis Gale
- Owner: Land and Property Management Authority (LPMA); Wollongong City Council

New South Wales Heritage Register
- Official name: North Beach Precinct; Northbeach; North Wollongong Beach; North Beach Bathing Pavilion; Wollongong Bathers Pavilion; Kiosk; Puckey's Salt Works; Tram Cutting; Battery Park; Smiths Hi
- Type: state heritage (landscape)
- Designated: 17 June 2005
- Reference no.: 1737
- Type: Urban Park
- Category: Parks, Gardens and Trees
- Builders: W.J. Anderson

North Beach Precinct is a heritage-listed precinct at Cliff Road, North Wollongong, City of Wollongong, New South Wales, Australia. It includes North Wollongong Beach, the North Beach/Wollongong Bathing Pavilion, Puckey's Salt Works, the Tram Cutting, Battery Park and Smiths Hill. It was added to the New South Wales State Heritage Register on 17 June 2005.

== History ==
=== Early history ===
The earliest people to have enjoyed North Beach were the Aboriginals who inhabited the Illawarra district. The five tribes that lived in the region favoured the coast because of its abundant resources of food. Although relationships between the Aboriginal people and early European settlers were initially peaceable, by the 1830s they had deteriorated as a result of the Europeans' laying claim to land and clearing it. As a result, the Aboriginal population declined sharply – by 1846 it was reported there were less than one hundred indigenous people remaining. Descendants from this small proportion of survivors still live in the area.

Although the existence of coal in the area was recognised by the end of the 1790s, the development of a coal industry had to wait for about fifty years, early forays into coal mining were to have an effect on the physical character of North Beach. The first but short-lived coal mine was opened up at Mount Keira in 1849 by James Shoobert. In 1857 a second and vastly more successful mine was opened, and in the following years mining began at Woonona, Bellambi, Coalcliff and Mount Pleasant. The Mount Pleasant Colliery began production in July 1861. The construction of a tramway that gave direct access to Wollongong harbour was a crucial element in the success of the mine, and it was decided to route it from the mine incline east to Fairy Creek and then into a reserve where it turned south and ran along the coast past North Beach and along the base of the cliff to Belmore Basin. It was built under the provisions of the Mount Pleasant Tramroads Act 1862 which enabled the Illawarra Coal Company, which owned the colliery, to construct the tramway through the coastal reserve. The tramway was to be open for public use on the payment of a toll and was opened for use in December 1862. It was upgraded in the early 1880s to accommodate locomotive haulage, and the company took delivery of its first locomotive in 1884.

Industry came briefly to North Beach the following decade when an English pharmacist, Courtney Puckey, established an experimental saltworks at the southern end of the beach adjacent to the railway cutting, which still forms a prominent landmark. The saltworks operated for about ten years from the middle of the 1890s onwards. Although short-lived and "commercially inconsequential" it is significant as the only Australian example of a "tea-tree framework" presently known to be recorded pictorially.

During the 1920s Wollongong Council expressed some interest in the possibility of acquiring the land between Stuart Park and the Illawarra Coal Company's wharf, and requested meetings with the Company to discuss the issue. In April 1932 a meeting was held at the NSW Public Works Department in Sydney which included delegates from Wollongong Council to discuss the removal of the tramway from the foreshores, but apparently little or no action was forthcoming. The Mount Pleasant colliery closed in 1933 as a result of the Great Depression, and went into liquidation the following year. It was acquired by Broken Hill Proprietary in December 1936. In the meantime, Wollongong Council had been persistently "endeavouring to secure the removal of the Mt. Pleasant Railway Line and the conversion of the site of the line into a promenade...but with little success". Then, on 16 November 1937 representatives of Broken Hill Pty met with members of Council. They advised that the company had decided to abandon the Mt Pleasant and Mt Keira railways and donate the land to Council, and expressed the hope "that the company's action will be useful to the Council in clearing up and beautifying the foreshores of Wollongong". In 1938 the land was finally given to Wollongong Council.

=== A tradition of sea bathing ===
Early bathing facilities were established in Wollongong not long after its foundation. Bathing facilities for ladies and men were in place at Brighton Beach by 1839. In 1856 public baths were established at Flagstaff Hill and the following year the Brighton Hotel introduced bathing machines to improve its seaside amenity.

Despite its apparent popularity, however, sea bathing was heavily proscribed. In 1870 it was forbidden to bathe between the hours of 8 a.m. and 7 p.m.. Furthermore, men and women were segregated and made to bathe at different locations. During the 1880s men bathed at Clarke's Hole and Gibson's Hole while women were confined to Flagstaff Point, but as the decade moved on restrictions eased a little, and sea bathing was only forbidden between the hours of 10 a.m. and 5 p.m. However, in 1888 it seems that crowds of recalcitrant men bathed from 3 p.m. onwards in defiance of the regulations, thus rendering the areas that they frequented unfit for the presence of women. Around the same time work began on upgrading the various bathing facilities in Wollongong, which at this period was frequently described as the "Brighton of NSW".

In March 1894 the first moves towards organised beach activities came about with a meeting held at the Brighton Hotel to form a men's swimming club. This almost coincided with the first incursions into surf life saving in New South Wales when a member of the St George Swimming Club suggested that life saving classes be started up in 1893.

After surf bathing hours were relaxed in 1902 there was a notable surge in the popularity of ocean bathing, but the dangers of the surf soon became very apparent. A public meeting was held in Wollongong Council Chambers on 11 January 1908 "for the purpose of forming a surf bathing and life saving club" with almost one hundred people in attendance. The mayor of Wollongong presided, and mentioned discussions that had taken place between a "visitor from Manly" and himself. The popularity of surf bathing, its attendant dangers and the necessity for a life saving club were raised. So were more some tangible benefits associated with the surf - "during the past four or five years the population of Manly, Bondi and other places had increased to a marvellous degree through surf bathing...surf bathing was not only a pleasant and healthy pastime, but was the means of bringing a large number of tourists to the town". As a result of the meeting the Wollongong Surf Bathing and Life Saving Club was formed, with the immediate enrolment of 57 members. It is indicative of the nature of the surf life saving movement at this time that the nascent club was offered support and encouragement from a number of clubs in Sydney, most scarcely a few years old themselves.

At the club's first practice session, held on 19 January 1908, some 600 spectators looked on at the activities. This was an impressive figure given that the population of Wollongong was then just under 3,000, and indicates the amount of interest that with surf bathing held for the local populace.

Though the Wollongong Surf Bathing and Life Saving Club was the first such organization to be formed in the Illawarra region, there were several others founded very shortly afterwards. For instance, the Helensburgh-Stanwell Park Life Saving and Surf Bathing Club commenced operating on 11 February 1908, Kiama Surf Bathers Club was founded on 14 March 1908 and a Club was established in Thirroul around August 1908.

In April 1908 a meeting was held concerning the erection of dressing sheds on North Beach. It was agreed that the Club and the Wollongong Municipal Council would raise a quarter of the required amount each while the balance would come from a pounds for pounds subsidy from the State Government. The Club set to work and staged fund raising activities such as dances, but it still took a year for it to accumulate the required sum of money. Still, by the end of 1909 a timber dressing shed for men was standing on what is now the site of the present North Beach Bathers' Pavilion and it was opened by the mayor at a surf carnival held on 30 November to celebrate the jubilee of the Municipality of Wollongong. Indeed, the Club was promoted as one of Wollongong's prime assets in a booklet that was published by the Council to promote the jubilee - "As a seaside resort Wollongong offers every attraction to the tourist. The surf bathing is of the best and is under the management of a most efficient club" - and a photograph of the new dressing shed took up an entire page. Should it be thought that the locals were demonstrating excessive pride in this matter, the Surf Bathing Association of NSW made it known that "accommodation provided at Wollongong for surf-bathing, thanks to an energetic Council and Life Saving Club, is probably the best on any of the beaches in the State, and in recognising the need for such, the Council have taken a step which could be followed with advantage by many other seaside municipal bodies".

Public facilities were expanded shortly afterwards. On 2 December 1910 a special Sand and Sport Day was held to celebrate the completion of a dressing shed for women and a kiosk. This too was officially opened by the Mayor of Wollongong. The new dressing shed was located near Stuart Park while the kiosk, which was leased out, was located between it and the men's shed. Further improvements in the form of fencing and seats had also been constructed along the cliff above the beach.

While the amenities for the public at North Beach may have been improving, the situation within the Wollongong Surf Bathing and Life Saving Club was certainly not. A group calling themselves the Water Rats, which took an intense interest in life saving, broke away from the Club in 1911. The Water Rats also began their operations on North Beach and friction between the two clubs inevitably developed because both wanted control of the beach. The Water Rats decided to change their name to the North Wollongong Surf Life Saving Club in September 1914. At a Mayoral conference held on 28 December 1914 attended by members of both clubs it was moved that a unified North Wollongong Surf Bathing and Life Saving Club be formed. This motion was carried unanimously, thus resolving the awkward situation.

Over the next few years a number of improvements were carried out or proposed on and around North Beach. Extensions to both sheds so that children could be accommodated were made in 1912. A room for the Surf Club was built several years later. It was funded jointly by the Club, the Council, and also the North Wollongong Progress Association and was officially opened on 19 December 1917. A proposal for a lookout station on the beach was put forward in 1920, while the pleasures of a visit to the Beach were enhanced by the installation of a soda fountain in the kiosk. Wollongong Municipal Council maintained its involvement in the running of North Beach by employing a lifesaver in November 1921. It handed over control to the tenant of the Kiosk in the second half of 1922 and the tenant ended up employing the lifesaver and attending to the dressing sheds.

The site has been used for major surf life saving events throughout the twentieth century. The first annual combined surf carnival, organised by the South Coast Surf Lifesaving Association (founded in 1917), was held at North Beach during March 1922. The first State Championship Carnival staged by a country branch of the Surf Life Saving Association in NSW was held there during the 1949-50 season and then the Australian Championships in March 1952.

From the 1970s particular groups of youth subculture such as "surfers" and "revheads" have used this area extensively, adding more informal and unofficial usages and meanings. The beach and its associated buildings have been increasingly important also to older Australians, offering sites for gatherings of informal groups of friends and relatives, often made up of retired people from nearby suburbs.

=== North Beach Bathing Pavilion and Kiosk ===
It would appear that around the year 1924 proposals were put forward for the replacement of the dressing sheds with a new pavilion, and repairs were carried out on the sheds pending the construction of the new building the following year. This did not in fact eventuate, but the Surf Club gained some additional space when Council gave it at least a part of the boys' dressing shed towards the end of 1929, owing to the destructive activities of recalcitrant children towards the shed. However, the issue of replacing the dressing sheds did not go away. Wollongong Council's Parks and Baths Committee received correspondence at the beginning of 1931 raising the matter. Its response, given the economic depression of the period, was understandably negative - "[t]he matter of drainage and the erection of new surf sheds will be dealt with in any beach improvement scheme to be considered, but the costs of the work are too great for immediate action".

At the end of May 1935 Council's Parks and Gardens Committee received a deputation from the Surf Club to discuss proposed improvements to North Beach. The Club submitted two proposals, one for a new clubhouse and the other for a "club house and public dressing sheds with kiosk combined". The Club was seeking guidance from Council as to whether it could proceed with either of the schemes and also some assistance in obtaining funding from the state government's Unemployed Relief Council to cover the cost of building. The Club had already managed to raise £800. The Council, however, did not commit itself. The Club approached Council again the following June in an effort to arrange a meeting to discuss the proposals. The Parks and Gardens Committee did meet with representatives of the South Beach Surf Club place in the first half of July, at which a proposal for new facilities for that beach were favourably received. At the same time the committee "proposed" to meet with North Beach "with a view of arriving at a definite proposal also from this body".

At the end of August representatives of the Council and the two Surf Clubs met with the Minister for Local Government, Mr Spooner, to discuss loan funding for "surfing" accommodation at North and South Beaches. The Minister visited Bulli Shire and Wollongong on 28 September 1935 and announced that the sum of £8,750 was to be made available for dressing sheds at South Wollongong Beach and a club house at North Beach. This enabled the North Beach Surf Club to build a new clubhouse. Tenders were called for the clubhouse and were opened at the end of October 1935. The foundation stone for the building was laid by the Mayor of Wollongong on 25 January 1936 and it was officially opened by Adrian Curlewis, President of the Surf Life Saving Association of Australia on 2 May 1936. The clubhouse was designed by J. Hugh Britten, who had also prepared the earlier, unsuccessful scheme that included dressing accommodation and the kiosk.

In August 1936 Council's Parks and Gardens Committee recommended demolition of the old surf pavilion and recycling the timber from it to repair other buildings at North Beach. While the old dressing sheds and kiosk continued in use, there were now some pressing problems associated with them, not the least of which was that the Surf Club 'was unable to use its balcony at present owing to its overlooking the lady's dressing sheds'. However, it was going to take a little more time for new facilities to eventuate, despite Council having List of mayors and lord mayors of Wollongong7,000 in funds ready to build new dressing sheds in November 1936. One of the aldermen, with an eye to economy, suggested that surfers using the beach preferred "an open shed as at present with perhaps a brick wall".

Once again, the Club submitted plans describing the layout of new facilities to Council for its consideration early in 1937. A Council committee visited North Beach on 27 February 1937 and held discussions with members of the Club and the caretaker about these improvements. It was resolved that members of the committee, that is the Health Inspector and Engineer, inspect facilities on some of the "more important surf beaches in the Metropolitan area" on 13 March following. The result of this was that at the beginning of April a recommendation was made to Council that the pair be requested to prepare a scheme for new facilities. The Health Inspector duly prepared a scheme and at the end of May was instructed to work in collaboration with Council's Engineer and architect Hugh Britten on the final documentation for dressing sheds and a kiosk. What eventuated was two schemes prepared by Hugh Britten. One consisted of three separate pavilions, while the other combined all of the facilities into one building. Council moved to accept the second proposal at its meeting on 15 July 1937. But it was far from over. It appears that the Surf Club had problems with the proposal because of privacy issues relating to the dressing sheds and the location of the kiosk. Despite a special meeting held shortly afterwards, the design of the new dressing sheds and kiosk remained unresolved for some months. The Club requested a meeting with Council to reopen discussions at the end of July, but in the middle of October Council was still deferring consideration of the dressing sheds and kiosk. At the end of the year there was some discourse within Council concerning the possibility of holding a competition for the beautification of the oceanfront extending from the northern to the southern end of its eastern boundary. This included North Beach.

Notwithstanding all this, Council directed Harvey B. Gale, Council's long serving Health Inspector, to prepare documentation for dressing accommodation and a kiosk and residence at the end of December 1937 and in the second half of January 1938 Gale was able to submit plans for approval. Accordingly, Council requested completion of the documentation and tenders for the construction of the buildings were invited at the beginning of February. Five tenders were received by the beginning of March, including one from J. H. Britten. It was the lowest tender and duly accepted. However, this decision was rescinded about two weeks later and fresh tenders were called. That of W. J. Anderson was accepted around 21 April. At last, construction could begin.

The new dressing pavilion, designed to accommodate the needs of 2,000 persons, and the nearby refreshment kiosk were opened on 12 November 1938 in front of several hundred spectators by the Minister for Works and Local Government, Eric Spooner. The new buildings were described fulsomely in the Illawarra Mercury:

'The modern design of the new buildings adds a distinct beauty to the beach and the composite picture is one that would be hard to equal in Australia...The dressing pavilion is 250 feet [76.2 metres] in length, and 34 feet [10.36 metres] wide. It is set at the base of a grass covered cliff amongst terraced lawns. The bricks are a warm red on a cream facing, and the design is unique. Sweeping lines enhanced by a cloister effect along the front elevation of the building are the outstanding features. Fibro cement screens surmounting the walls of the building give an extremely modernistic tone. The rear of the building has a different treatment and is equally simple and effective.
'Designed to give the maximum of light and sunshine, the interior of the building is attractive. Both the men and women's sections are spacious and open. The women's section has 34 cubicles in addition to the usual facilities. In both places mirrors and washbasins are provided. A block of four showers in each section has an unusual feature. The flooring in each shower block has been built of brick which have a non- slippery surface and are porous. A great deal of attention has been paid to the drainage, which is carried well away from the beach. There are ten modem tiled lavatories in the building.
'The design and supervision was carried out by Mr H Gale, chief inspector for the Wollongong Council. He said the designs were his original designs and they were to give the minimum service with the maximum sunlight and fresh air. . . '(52)

A number of extra items were included during construction, including plumbing for hot water and the construction of additional brickwork, screens and lattice to prevent the public seeing into the dressing areas from the cliffs behind the building. However, the Kiosk, if not the Bathing Pavilion, was suffering from a number of aggravating problems less than ten years after it was built. In 1946 it was reported that the roof was leaking, causing stains on the ceilings of the kitchen, laundry and shop, while termites were infesting floor joists, skirting boards and doors.

The two buildings formed an important adjunct to a major event during the 1949-50 season when the Illawarra Branch of the Surf Life Saving Association of Australia and North Wollongong Surf Life Saving Club hosted the first State Championship Carnival to be staged by a country branch of the Surf Life Saving Association in New South Wales. This necessitated the destruction of trees and bulldozing part of the beach to form a car park. The two organizations then went on to conduct the Australian Championships at North Beach in March 1952.

The Bathing Pavilion and Kiosk enjoyed a close association with the North Wollongong Surf Life Saving Club in the post war years because of leasing arrangements with the Council. At this time a number of lessees had direct associations with the Surf Club because of their membership, and their wives would manage the Kiosk while they would look after the Pavilion. The lessee's duties included supervision, control and guarding the beach and its buildings (other than the surf club) and keeping the beach, reserve and Bathing Pavilion clean. One of the lease conditions specified that the interior and the exterior of the Kiosk were to be painted at least once during the term of the lease. At least two modifications to the Kiosk were documented at this time - the timber lattice screen and gate enclosing the porch on the western side of the building and fencing on its northern side were in place before the end of 1955.

The most substantial alterations to the Bathing Pavilion for which documentation exists took place at the end of the 1960s. They comprised replacement of the seating within the dressing sheds and reduction in the number of benches, construction of solid masonry partitions between toilet cubicles in the male dressing area and replacement of early stairs on the eastern side of the building with new flights of concrete stairs. New concrete floor slabs were documented for the dressing areas as well Such expenditure indicated that the Pavilion was still well patronised, perhaps not surprising given that North Beach was reputedly the most popular beach on the Illawarra coastline. Several years later, documentation for the replacement of a large section of concrete floor slab in the central section of the Bathing Pavilion was prepared during 1976.

The Surf Club reinstated its role in the management of the Kiosk when it purchased the lease of the Kiosk in 1980 (or 1981), but sold it two years later after being unable to make a profit.

The special character of North Beach was brought to the attention of a national audience in 1983 with the publication of an article on Wollongong's interwar architecture in the journal Heritage Australia:

'Where once upon a time a railway line ran along North Wollongong Beach to the boat harbour, now pedestrians stroll past pavilions, dressing sheds and Continental Baths built in the interwar years. Just past the paths are the North Wollongong dressing pavilion and the Surf Life Saving Club's premises. Together these buildings, with their spectacular ocean setting, make an architectural and aesthetic precinct of considerable grace. Permanent conservation orders should be placed on all the items in this pedestrian precinct' (61).

Ironically, it was during this decade that a threat to the buildings emerged with the construction of the North Beach International Business and Leisure Resort, which opened in December 1982. After the building changed hands in 1987 its new owners called for the demolition of the Bathing Pavilion, provoking a defensive reaction amongst some sections of the community. In July 1989 Council decided to seek expressions of interest for the renovation of the Bathing Pavilion, adapting it into multi-use facility incorporating a cafe or kiosk, a shop and new changing facilities. The following April North Beach was the centre of national attention when it set the scene once again for the Australian Surf Life Saving Championships.

In 1993 Council received two expressions of interest for the reuse of the Pavilion. The proposals were both for restaurants. One was received from the local cafe proprietor and ex-footballer Michael Bolt, while the other came from the Queensland based Alben Holdings Pty Ltd restaurant chain. The proposal put forward by the chain, the design of which was prepared by the architectural firm of Jones Brewster Regan, described modifications to the building that would have altered its appearance and character - new roofs over much of the dressing areas, new stairs on the eastern side of the building and removal of portions of the eastern walls enclosing the dressing areas to open up views across the beach. Council approved the application on 24 May 1993. However, the approval met with opposition from members of the community, the other applicant and the South Coast Labour Council, which quickly imposed a black ban on the redevelopment of the site. Council conducted a community survey in the second half of 1993 which apparently favoured the proposed development but the union ban remained firmly in place. In 1995 the Surf Club put forward its own proposal, which was to turn the building into a cultural and community centre and the following year the Pukapuka Cook Island Community Group submitted an expression of interest for a cultural centre that was rejected by the city's Lord Mayor, David Campbell (68).

The pavilion closed for refurbishment in 2011 and reopened in 2012, having been restored with the addition of a cafe, a new pedestrian promenade and the replacement of the seawall. Remains of the former saltworks were uncovered during the restoration works.

In 2018, the building houses the Northbeach Pavilion Pizza Restaurant, Bar and Kiosk.

=== The Architecture of Beach Pavilions ===
The interwar period was significant in that it witnessed the construction of architecturally considered surf and bathing pavilions along the coast of New South Wales. This reflected the important place that recreation on the beach held for many people across the country during the interwar period: 'Surfing and sunbaking...were almost obligatory for young people on the coast...Bondi was a national symbol; in Perth Cottesloe proclaimed itself "the Bondi of the West". On weekends and public holidays people flocked to the beaches to anoint their bodies and be immersed, the newspapers duly estimating the size of the crowds attending each resort'. The importance of beaches in the life of Australians was noted by overseas commentators as well. For instance, both life on the beaches and the exceptional activities of the surf lifesaving movement were brought to the attention of American readers in an article on Australia's capital cities appearing in National Geographic magazine for December 1935.

Apart from the convenience and amenity that they furnished, one important reason for the construction of a number of pavilions during the 1930s was the provision of much needed work for the unemployed, and many were funded out of the state government's Unemployment Relief Council. A large number of bathing pavilions and surf clubhouses were built along the coastline of New South Wales. They were new building types that appear to have reached a definitive form by the end of the 1920s.

Wollongong certainly appears to have established a respectable tradition of beach related architecture during the interwar period, much of which has been lost. Demolished buildings include the Continental Baths Pavilion and Baths, which were operating at the end of 1925 and officially opened by the Mayor on 6 March 1926, Woonona Baths Pavilion (1928), and the Austinmer Bathing Pavilion, promenade and Surf Club (1930). The buildings at North Beach were relatively late additions to the genre as was the South Beach Pavilion which was opened on 9 October 1936. This building was designed by C. D. Leake and consisted of a central two storey pavilion flanked on either side by attached wings housing men and women's dressing areas. The central pavilion included a kiosk, ladies' club room, residence for the kiosk lessee and an assembly hall for the surf club. The South Beach pavilion was demolished between in the 2000s.

Another extant beach pavilion from the interwar period is located at Thirroul. It was officially opened by Eric Spooner on 20 January 1940. It consists of a central single storey pavilion containing a kiosk and residence. The eastern facade of the pavilion has a simple though effective Art Deco character, and is flanked on each side by attached male and female dressing pavilions. The surf clubhouse is a separate building located to the immediate north of the complex. An olympic sized swimming pool was also built as part of the complex, which was funded by the state government on a pound for pound basis (74). The other pavilions and clubhouses located along Wollongong's northern beaches are all relatively recent structures.

There were a number of surf pavilions erected at the beaches included in Sydney's metropolitan area. Perhaps the most grand and elaborate of all was built at Bondi Beach, the Bondi Pavilion. Designed by the influential architectural firm of Robertson and Marks, it was designed to accommodate the extraordinary number of 12,000 visitors and opened in 1930. Numerous facilities were provided within one large building. The ground floor contained dressing areas, shops, Victorian-style Turkish baths, a gymnasium, auditorium and the manager's residence, while a ballroom, dining rooms and office space were located on the first floor. At the opposite end of the 1930s the Manly Surf pavilion (completed in 1938) represented the acme of functional architectural modernism. This building, shaped like a boomerang in plan, combined dressing areas over which sun bathing decks were located and quarters for the surf club. The building won the Sir John Sulman Medal for 1939, partly for its harmonious relationship with its setting. It has since been demolished.

The Cronulla Beach Surf Pavilion is another notable building, and was completed during 1940. It was designed by architect A. B. Polin in a rather severe Interwar Stripped Classical style. Here men's and women's dressing areas were separated by a central two storey pavilion - 'In the men's section there is cubicle accommodation encircling a large area, while the centre is taken up by blocks of lockers under hoods of curved corrugated asbestos cement roofing. The floor here is of the orthodox batten type...In the ladies' section accommodation is on similar lines with more cubicles. These are arranged in two tiers, the upper ones being approached from the sun-baking area on the upper level". An adjacent surf clubhouse was completed at the same time.

Few interwar pavilions remain on Sydney's northern beaches. There is an interwar Mediterranean style pavilion containing dressing and surf club accommodation at Newport Beach. It was opened by the Minister of Labour and Industry, John Dunningham, on 30 September 1933. The pavilion at Freshwater Beach is also a Mediterranean style building and was designed by club member Lindsay Scott. It was opened by Eric Spooner on 8 September 1935. Scott held the positions of vice president and honorary architect to the Surf Life Saving Association during the 1930s and also designed surf pavilions for Palm Beach, South Curl Curl and Harbord beaches. Palm Beach is also graced by a fine Interwar Functionalist dressing pavilion that was constructed around 1936. Although its designer has not been ascertained, this may be the building designed by Scott. The pavilion contains a central circulation space with changing spaces on either side.

Some fine surf pavilions were erected in Newcastle. Nobby's Beach Surf Pavilion was designed by the City Architect F. A. Scorer and opened on 1 December 1934. It was designed as a central pavilion with attached flanking dressing sheds in the Interwar Mediterranean style. Bar Beach Surf Pavilion was designed by architects A. J. Brown and S. F. Coleman in association with Newcastle architects F. O. and A. C. Castleden. It was completed in 1933 and was considered to have no equals in the district and to be comparable to any in Sydney. The building contained facilities for the surf club, a refreshment kiosk, an office, lavatories, the caretaker's residence, sunbathing accommodation, and changing areas - 500 lockers and 50 cubicles were provided for men and 100 lockers and 250 cubicles for women. The exterior of the building was designed in an idiom that combined the Interwar Spanish Mission and Art Deco styles. The Merewether Surf Pavilion was completed in 1937. It was designed by the architectural firm of Pitt and Merewether in a restrained Art Deco idiom and consisted of a central two storey pavilion containing a caretaker's flat and surf club room on the first floor, flanked on either side by attached dressing pavilions. The building was officially opened by Eric Spooner.

Distinctive pavilions were also erected in other parts of the state. For instance, an elegant Georgian Revival building consisting of a high central pavilion flanked by lower attached pavilions was erected at Forster.

Other Interwar beach pavilions still exist within the Illawarra Region. They include the 1940 beach pavilion and surf life saving club at Thirroul.

== Description ==
The Bathing Pavilion and Kiosk form an important part of the environs of North Beach. The buildings do much to define the visual character of the beach and regulate the movement of pedestrian and bicycle movement along this section of coast. From a distance the bathing pavilion in particular is visible as a prominent landmark against the cliff that rises behind it. Both buildings are related visually to the Surf Club to the north because of a shared architectural aesthetic. The grassed and paved open space that extends from the Bathing Pavilion to the Surf Club and in front of the kiosk plays an integral role in the recreational uses of North Beach.

Both the North Beach Bathing Pavilion and the Kiosk are examples of what has become known as the Interwar Functionalist style. This style minored the infiltration of aspects of European modem architecture of the 1920s and 1930s into the local architectural mainstream. It became relatively prevalent from 1936 onwards and still remained popular during the post war era. Characteristics of the style, a number of which are evident in these two buildings, include simple geometric shapes, light toned colours, contrasting horizontal and vertical motifs, large areas of glazing and bands of windows, plain surfaces in cement render or face brick and flat or pitched roofs concealed behind high parapets. Lettering was often integrated into the design of buildings. The Interwar Functionalist style is quite common in Wollongong, and numerous examples of a variety of building types demonstrating its characteristics have survived down to the present day (3).

=== North Beach Bathing Pavilion ===
The North Beach Bathing Pavilion is a long single storey building consisting of a central pavilion with high parapets on the eastern and western sides concealing a pitched roof. It is flanked on each side by large dressing areas that are mostly open to the sky. The male dressing area, on the southern side, is longer than the female dressing area on the north. The building sits on a base of dark brick while the remainder is constructed of light toned brick Tall semi circular parapets enclose the ends of the dressing areas and are covered with cement render over their external faces. The floor of the building consists of a suspended concrete slab supported by load bearing brick walls and brick piers. Roofing consists of corrugated asbestos cement sheeting which is deteriorating, especially above the dressing areas which are only roofed along their western sides.

It has been observed that sea water has entered at the base of the Bathing Pavilion during severe storms. Although flooding of the building has not taken place, the roller door on the eastern side of the building has been damaged. It would appear that this is the only storm-related problem to have affected the building However, the condition of some brick surfaces and metal items reflects the harsh conditions to which the building is subjected.

The report, Preliminary Structural Investigation North Beach Pavilion Wollongong, dated June 1995, was prepared by McMillan Britton & Kell Pty Limited. It concluded that brick and concrete damage was superficial in nature and that minor differential foundation movement has caused moderate cracking in brickwork in some locations. Other cracking has taken place as a result of expansion due to corrosion of ferrous fixings.

Pavilion Exterior

The Bathing Pavilion as built differs in some respects from the early documentation held at Wollongong Council. The principal differences include the arches along the eastern side of the base of the building, which repeat at regular intervals rather than being grouped in threes as shown on the drawings. The opening below the male dressing area near the central pavilion, designated for surf canoes was never built, and the walls around the dressing areas are higher than documented, particularly at the northern and southern ends, to overcome privacy problems that became evident during construction.

Alterations to the exterior of the building include the following: the concrete stairs on the eastern side of the building, bricking up of the openings behind the arches along the base of the building; insertion of a roller shutter in an enlarged opening to the early female toilets that were accessible from the pathway on the western side of the building and bricking up of the equivalent opening to male toilets. The flagpoles have been removed from the western facade, but appear to have been placed on the roof of the building. A clock was installed on the eastern facade, and reference to a photograph published in 1977 suggests that the clock appeared during or after that year. All of the doors have removed from the main eastern and western entrances. The cement rendered architraves around the high window opens above and beside the main western entrance are badly stained as a result of corrosion of metal elements within the openings.

The external appearance of the Bathing Pavilion is very much the same as it was in 1938, although the area between it and the Kiosk has been modified. The terraces visible in early photographs of the precinct have been replaced by a crib block retaining wall . . . The main western entrance has been subjected to modification, most particularly by the removal of flag poles and lettering from the parapet and the enlargement of the opening to the former female toilets on the western side. Corrosion of metal grilled over window openings is staining the rendered sills. The main entrance has also been the subject of modification, which includes the installation of a clock within the parapet, replacement of timber stairs with concrete stairs and the introduction of intrusive security gates across the opening beneath the stair landing.

Pavilion Interior

The original plan of the building is still very much in evidence and is very much the same as shown on the early documents. However, the interior of the building has been modified to some extent, most notably during the late 1960s and 1970s. Then seating and joinery in the dressing areas was replaced, masonry toilet cubicles in the male dressing rooms were constructed and new concrete floor slabs documented (and presumably laid). Other alterations include bricking up of counter openings in the western walls of the former northern and southern attendant's offices, along with the high openings above these spaces. A door opening has been cut into what was formerly the externally accessed male toilet from within the southern passage.

Showers located in the dressing areas have been retiled, while the seats have been largely removed from the male dressing area. The female dressing area has, by contrast, retained a large number of joinery items including a series of cubicles located against the western wall which appear to be early, if not original.

The basic layout of the Bathing Pavilion remains unaltered, although the function of some spaces has changed. This has meant that some early openings have been filled in, most notably in walls associated with the early attendant's rooms on the eastern side of the pavilion.

=== North Beach Kiosk ===
The Kiosk, like the Bathers' Pavilion, has retained much of its original external form and internal layout. However, its fabric is deteriorating in places.

Kiosk Exterior

Alterations to the exterior of the Kiosk, or elements that were modified from the original documentation during construction, include the following items. Minor modifications were made to the parapet, most particularly at the southern end of the building around the flagpole. Photographic evidence indicates that this took place while the building was under construction. Installation of a timber screen and gate enclosing the porch on the western side of the building was carried out prior to the end of 1955. A garage has been constructed on the eastern side of the building, although the date that this took place has not been ascertained. The eastern wall of the garage serves as a showering area for those using the beach. The window to the Kitchen consists of double hung sashes on either side of a wide fixed pane, whereas the original drawings show a pair of double hung sashes separated by an area of brickwork, and an early photograph of the building confirms that the original configuration has been altered. Another modification to windows consists of tiling that has been laid on the sills of the windows illuminating the shop area. The rainwater head on the eastern side of the building has also been replaced, perhaps reflecting the repairs of which the roof of the building has been subjected in the past. Fabric on the exterior of the building is deteriorating in places. This is most evident in the arch bars over windows along the northern wall which are corroding and the rather crude repointing of brickwork on the northern side of the building. The exterior of the kiosk is essentially the same as documented in 1938. Apart from detail modifications that were made during construction, the major external modifications since that time have been the addition of the garage and the enlargement of the window of the kitchen area.

The northern side of the Kiosk shows most evidence of deterioration. The brickwork has been repointed in recent times in a poor fashion. Mortar has been left on many bricks. Steel lintels are also corroding and sagging above window and door openings and require urgent attention.

Some intrusive and ugly items have been added to the western side of the Kiosk, including a sign, the deteriorating lattice screen across the porch, a storage tank, electrical meter board and electrical conduits.

Kiosk Interior

Alterations to the interior of the Kiosk, or elements that were modified from the original documentation during construction, include the following items. The shop area within the Kiosk has been modified and now contains two separate sections, a sales area and a food preparation area. The counter shown on the original documents has been removed, as has the western column within the space. The floor of the space has been tiled relatively recently and a new counter has been installed. However, early finishes such as the textured render on walls and piers and the ceiling lining and cavetto profile cornices, are still in place.

Room 1, designed as a store, now serves the function of a scullery. The floor has been tiled relatively recently, and shelving and a stainless steel sink have been installed. The wall surface below the southern window is deteriorating. Room 2 was originally designated as a kitchen attached to the Kiosk. The opening in the southern wall between it and the kiosk has been altered and a domestic kitchen has been installed within the southern part of the room. The room has retained early cornices and ceiling linings, but the floor is covered with cork tiles that were probably laid at the same time as the kitchen joinery, around 1980. Sliding doors have been installed on the openings leading to Rooms I and 3; the original drawings do not indicate that these openings were originally fitted with door leaves. Room 3 was originally designated a dining room. Its early fabric is generally intact. A door has been fitted into the opening in the northern wall leading into the hallway; the original drawings do not indicate that this opening was originally fitted with a door leaf.

Room 4 was originally designated a bedroom. Its early fabric is generally intact. However, the ceiling and cornices have been damaged in the north western corner of the room and are deteriorating. There is also a severe crack in the wall surface above the northern side of the doorway. A large wardrobe has been installed in relatively recent times. The floor is covered with carpet. Room 5 was also designated a bedroom, and its early fabric is generally intact. It is the only room in the building, apart from the hallway, to have a picture rail around its walls. The floor is covered with carpet.

Room 6 was originally designated Hot Water. It appears relatively unaltered, and currently serves as a store room. Room 7 still retains its original function, that of Laundry and Bathroom. Original wall tiling and ceiling linings survive. The original window on the eastern wall has also survived, but opens into the garage.

== Heritage listing ==
The North Beach Precinct, Wollongong is of State significance for demonstrating the recreational role played by surfing and beach culture during the twentieth century in coastal NSW in conjunction with important remnants of the industrial heritage of Wollongong. The North Beach Bathing Pavilion and Kiosk, Wollongong are good and relatively intact examples of the Interwar Functionalist style of architecture. The Bathing Pavilion and Kiosk have a strong aesthetic relationship to each other, as well as to the greatly altered Surf Life Saving Club, also dating from the 1930s. The tramway cutting is a significant reminder of the days when coal was transported from Mount Pleasant through North Beach to Wollongong Harbour, while the archaeological site of Puckey's Salt Works offers research potential concerning the history of salt manufacture in NSW.

Comparison with other beach architecture built during the 1930s in New South Wales indicates that this architectural style is rare in this genre, that separating the functions of pavilion / kiosk / and Surf Life Saving Club into separate buildings is a rare arrangement of beach architecture and that intact Interwar seaside architecture is increasingly rare in NSW. The buildings have research potential of State significance for demonstrating aspects of the management and social uses of beaches in New South Wales throughout the twentieth century. The Surf Life Saving Club is sited on a separate title of land and this SHR listing may be later expanded to include the building because of its strong historical and geographical associations with the group; however the extent of its renovations requires further investigation.

It is rare to find this conjunction of seaside architecture and industrial remnants / archaeology in such close proximity. The site is also of high local significance for its landmark Interwar seaside buildings within the Illawarra region and for the historical, cultural and social associations of the place within the Wollongong community.

North Beach Precinct was listed on the New South Wales State Heritage Register on 17 June 2005 having satisfied the following criteria.

The place is important in demonstrating the course, or pattern, of cultural or natural history in New South Wales.

The North Beach Precinct is of State significance firstly for its remnants of the industrial heritage of Wollongong. The curtilage includes the tramway cutting used to transport coal to Wollongong Harbour from the Mount Pleasant mine (1861–1933) and the archaeological site of Puckey's Salt Works (1895–1905). Secondly the site is of State significance for demonstrating the recreational role played by surfing and beach culture during the twentieth century for people in coastal NSW. Robert Irving states: "The Pavilion . . . is a marvellous monument to the enthusiasm with which Wollongong people have devoted themselves to the pleasures of the beach." The beach buildings also provide historical evidence of the State Government's provision of capital for the construction of public facilities during the Great Depression and of Wollongong City Council's long-term role in providing recreational amenities for its citizens. The site is also associated with national surf life saving events.

The place has a strong or special association with a person, or group of persons, of importance of cultural or natural history of New South Wales's history.

The North Beach Bathing Pavilion, Kiosk and Surf Life Saving Club (SLSC) are of high local significance for their association with the North Wollongong Surf Bathing and Life Saving Club, which lobbied for their construction throughout the 1930s. This was the first surf life saving club to be formed in the region, and the building is still used by life savers to patrol the beach. The buildings have strong associations with Wollongong City Council because of its role in documenting, constructing and managing them, and particular associations with Council's Architect, J Hugh Britten who designed the SLSC in 1936 and Council's Health Inspector Harvey Ennis Gale who designed the Bathing Pavilion and Kiosk buildings in 1938. The archaeological site of Puckey's Salt Works also has high local significance for its association with Courtenay Puckey, a prominent local pharmacist and businessman.

The place is important in demonstrating aesthetic characteristics and/or a high degree of creative or technical achievement in New South Wales.

The North Beach Bathing Pavilion and Kiosk, Wollongong are of State significance as good and relatively intact examples of the Interwar Functionalist style of architecture. The Bathing Pavilion and Kiosk have a strong aesthetic relationship to each other, as well as to the greatly altered Surf Life Saving Club also dating from the 1930s. As a group the three buildings constitute a visual presence integral to the character of North Beach. Auchmuty and Spearritt state that "these buildings, with their spectacular ocean setting, make an architectural and aesthetic precinct of considerable grace". Robert Irving states: 'The Pavilion . . . in one of Wollongong's most favoured locations, is possibly Wollongong's most recognisable place.. Visually it certainly captures the culture of the surf bathing scene'.

The place has a strong or special association with a particular community or cultural group in New South Wales for social, cultural or spiritual reasons.

The North Beach Precinct is of high local significance because of the esteem in which the buildings are held within the community, evidenced by the public debates that have surrounded proposals for their adaptive reuse since the end of the 1980s. The Bathing Pavilion has an ongoing association with the Surf Club because it is used by life savers as a convenient location to watch over the beach, thus ensuring the safety of the public who bathe there. From the 1970s particular groups of youth subculture such as "surfers" and "revheads" have used this area extensively, adding more informal and unofficial usages and meanings. The beach and its associated buildings have been increasingly important also to older Australians, offering sites for gatherings of informal groups of friends and relatives, often made up of retired people from nearby suburbs.

The place has potential to yield information that will contribute to an understanding of the cultural or natural history of New South Wales.

The North Beach Precinct, Wollongong has research potential of State significance for demonstrating aspects of the management and social uses of beaches in New South Wales throughout the twentieth century. The archeological site of Puckey's Salt Works offers research potential concerning the history of salt manufacture in NSW. Although 'short-lived and "commercially inconsequential" it is significant as the only Australian example of a "tea-tree framework" ...presently known to be recorded pictorially'.

The place possesses uncommon, rare or endangered aspects of the cultural or natural history of New South Wales.

The North Beach Precinct, Wollongong is of State significance as a rare and relatively intact grouping of Interwar beach architecture in NSW. Comparison with other beach architecture built during the 1930s in New South Wales indicates that this architectural style is rare in this genre, that separating the functions of pavilion / kiosk / and Surf Life Saving Club into separate buildings is a rare arrangement of beach architecture and that intact Interwar seaside architecture is increasingly rare in NSW. It is also rare to find this conjunction of seaside architecture and industrial remnants and archaeology in such close proximity.

The place is important in demonstrating the principal characteristics of a class of cultural or natural places/environments in New South Wales.

The North Beach Precinct, Wollongong is of State significance because of the relatively intact condition and configuration of the Bathing Pavilion and the Kioskand because of their siting in proximity to North Beach and the Surf Club building. They demonstrate the principal characteristics of a class of cultural environment – the leisure environment associated with beach activity since the 1930s.
