= Church Street, Wollongong =

Street in New South Wales, Australia

Church Street is a main north–south running street in the city of Wollongong, New South Wales, Australia. It contains many of Wollongong's well known and lesser known attractions and historic sites.

To the north it runs from the northern high rise district west of the harbour through apartments and flats and then down Smith's Hill, up Church Hill and down to Wollongong Central. At the summit of Church Hill is the site of St Michael's Anglican Pro-Cathedral.

At the mall a portion runs for pedestrian only use (though this is currently up for debate as to whether cars should be let back in limited amounts and times on Crown Street, the street running through the mall east–west) and then turns back to traffic along a section of light density commerce and residence for just over a kilometre. For the first half of this there is a long car park within the street, used often by mall shoppers and people watching games at local WIN Stadium a few blocks to the east, due to no cost parking. On the west side of this section is MacCabe Park (often mis-spelt McCabe), a local park with a playground and youth centre. South of this the street goes through residential areas to the immediate southern suburb of Coniston where it ends at J.J. Kelly Park, a local sporting venue, also used on occasion by circuses for tent sites.

== Historic sites and history ==
The street was created in the early 19th century, and contained a bottle factory and many houses. There are two historic churches on Church Hill, and many houses on the southern part of the street are over seventy years old. The old Wollongong Court House sits on the east side of the hill square, and is known for its clock tower. It was renovated in 2006.
