= Kemblawarra =

- Suburb
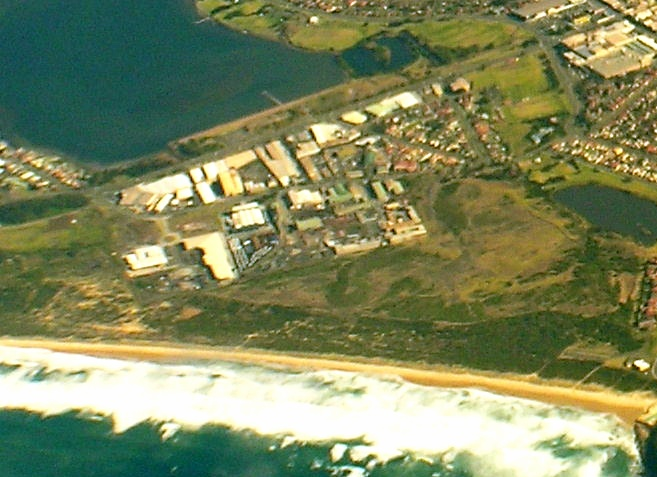
- Aerial view from east

- Coordinates: 34°29.4′S 150°53.6′E
- Country: Australia
- State: New South Wales
- City: Wollongong
- LGA: City of Wollongong
- Location: 94 km (58 mi) S of Sydney; 10 km (6.2 mi) S of Wollongong; 24 km (15 mi) N of Kiama

Government
  - State electorate: Wollongong
  - Federal division: Cunningham
- Elevation: 8 m (26 ft)
- Postcode: 2505
Suburbs around Kemblawarra
Warrawong	Port Kembla	Port Kembla
Lake Illawarra	Kemblawarra	Pacific Ocean
Lake Illawarra	Primbee	Pacific Ocean

Kemblawarra is a residential, commercial and light industrial area of Wollongong, New South Wales, Australia. It is officially designated an urban place, and comprises the south-eastern part of Warrawong (south of Northcliffe Drive) and the southern part of Port Kembla (south of Parkes Street.)
