= Primbee =

- Suburb
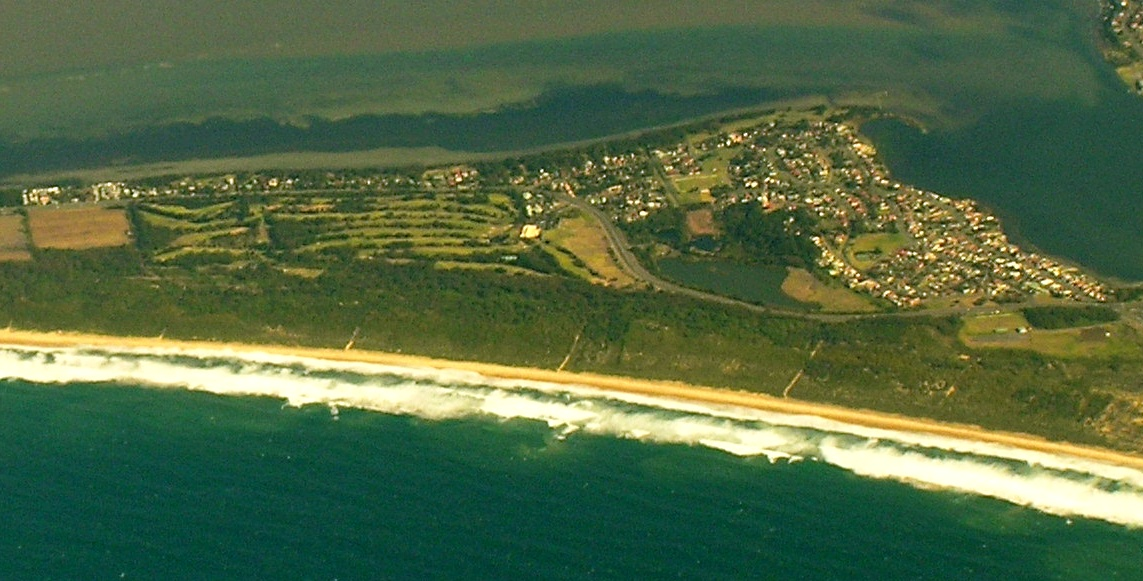
- Aerial view from east

- Coordinates: 34°30′03″S 150°52′54″E
- Country: Australia
- State: New South Wales
- City: Wollongong
- LGA: City of Wollongong
- Location: 95 km (59 mi) S of Sydney; 11 km (6.8 mi) S of Wollongong; 23 km (14 mi) N of Kiama

Government
  - State electorate: Wollongong
  - Federal division: Cunningham
- Elevation: 6 m (20 ft)

Population
  - Total: 1,623 (2021 census)
- Postcode: 2502
Suburbs around Primbee
Lake Illawarra	Warrawong	Port Kembla
Lake Illawarra	Primbee	Pacific Ocean
Lake Illawarra	Windang	Pacific Ocean

Primbee is a small suburb of Wollongong, New South Wales, Australia. It is located on the northern end of the Windang Peninsula separating Lake Illawarra and the Pacific Ocean. Primbee is close to Windang and Warrawong in the Illawarra. It was originally referred to as “The Lake Suburb” until formally being named as Primbee. It is sometimes referred to as "The Upper Peninsula" or "The Upper Island". The latter refers to a local legend that there was once a second entrance to Lake Illawarra located between Primbee and Kemblawarra Industrial Park.

== History ==
The source of the name Primbee is uncertain. Farms in the area were owned in the 1860s by James Stewart, David James and Thomas Griffin. An 1893 map for the Parish of Wollongong shows the bay off Purry Burry Point as Primbee Bay. The area was subdivided and the land was offered for sale in 1919, not as Primbee but as "The Lake Suburb".

One resident of the area in the 1920s recalled that "I came to Primbee in 1920... My parents were one of the first to buy property, when the estate was cut up. It was called Lake Suburb Estate at the time. I don't known how it came to be called Primbee. No one here was asked or told. It just came."

The local public school (Primbee Public School) was established in 1938. The principal as of 2013 is Dorothy Cass. It had an enrolment of 80 students covering Kindergarten to Year 6 at the beginning of 2011.
