= Crown Street =

Crown Street may refer to

- Crown Street, Sydney, Australia
- Crown Street, Wollongong, Australia
- Crown Street railway station, a defunct railway station in Liverpool, UK
