= Shire of Central Illawarra =

- Local government area
- Country: Australia
- State: New South Wales
- Region: Illawarra
- Abolished: 24 September 1947

The Shire of Central Illawarra, also known as Central Illawarra Shire, was a local government area in New South Wales, Australia. Until 1934, it was the Municipality of Central Illawarra. From 1868 to 1934, it was the Borough of Central Illawarra. Before 1868, it was the Municipality of Central Illawarra, which was established in 1859. It covered the area from Unanderra to Macquarie Rivulet, and had its council chambers at Unanderra.

The shire was amalgamated with the then-Municipality of Wollongong, Bulli Shire, and Municipality of North Illawarra, to form a Municipality of Greater Wollongong, which was at the same time proclaimed as the City of Greater Wollongong, on 24 September 1947.

The former council chambers building has been repurposed, first as a library and later as a community centre.
