= MacCabe Park =

Park in Wollongong, Australia

Coordinates: 34°25′54″S 150°53′34″E

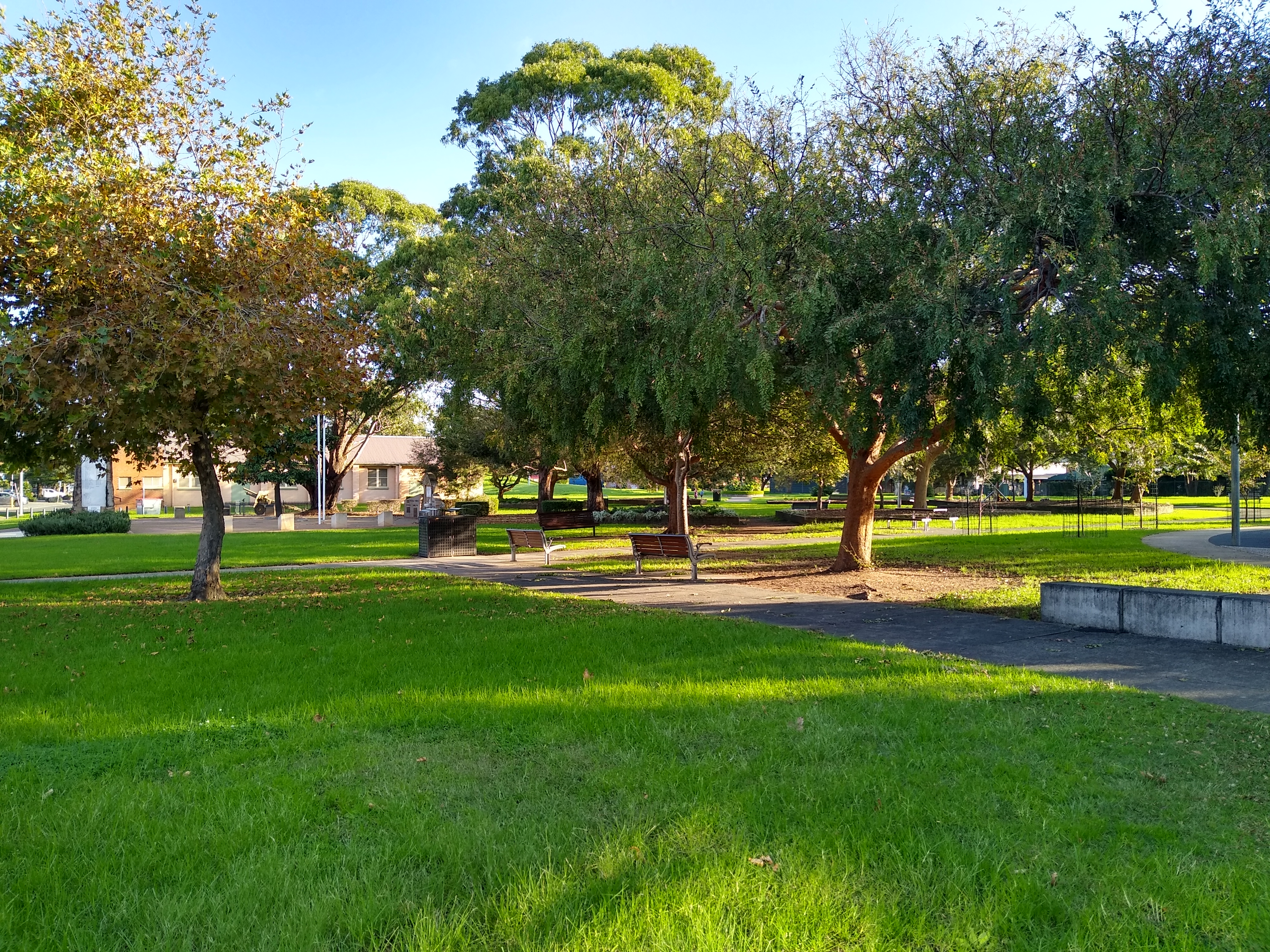
MacCabe Park

MacCabe Park is a park located in Wollongong, Australia. It is commonly misspelt McCabe Park, though the sign has since been changed to its correct name. In 1855, a land grant was made to Governor Brown, the present site of the park.

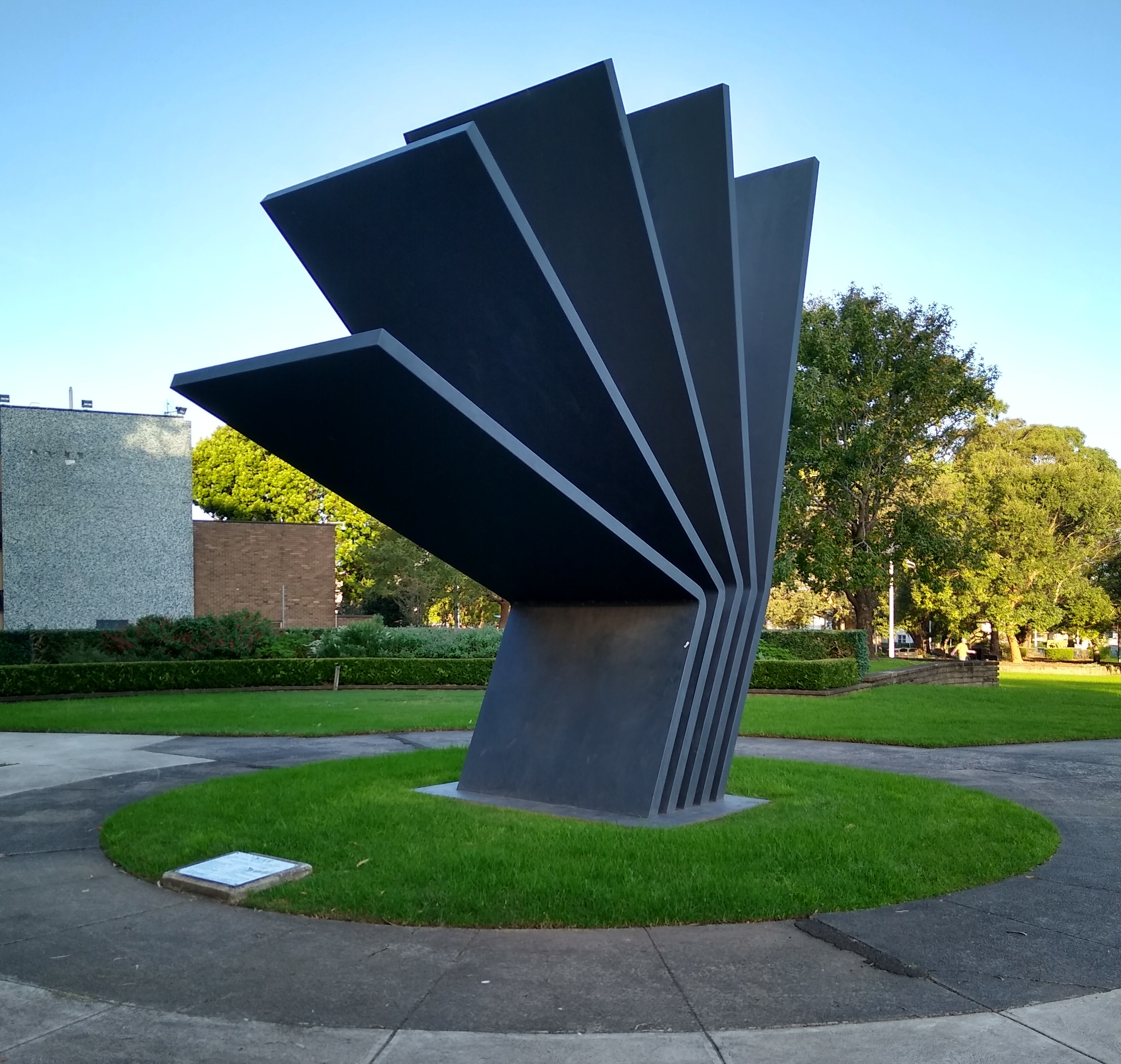
Nike, a sculpture in the park

It contains a playground at the north east corner of the rectangular area covered by the park, the local youth centre is in the north west side, and a sculpture called "Nike" is found in this area amidst a garden area. The youth centre has a small skating area and sometimes ramps and kickers are brought out, with a small number of fastened ramps present. The centre's walls are covered with graffiti and murals. A small strip of native plants and trees is present on the edge of the skating area. The northeastern area features a council operated art gallery and a war memorial, featuring a planted area and a canon. The west part of the park area features shops like Dick Smith bordering a narrow walkway underneath and between climbing plants. In the gaps between shops palm trees have been planted. Paths are present in the park and most of it is lawn grass. The southern end contains a man-made hillock with a smaller peak to its northern end and a larger slightly higher one at its southern end, with a circular amphitheatre of brick. In the southeastern and northwestern parts of the park are covered paths. In the eastern area is a community hall and carpark. The hall features a mural depicting a famous scene from E.T.

The park area is surrounded by streets, the east side borders Church Street, Wollongong, the west side borders Keira Street, the north borders Burelli Street, and the southern end borders Ellen Street. The park is located in the southern part of Wollongong's central business district, only two blocks from Wollongong Central and Wollongong Mall.

Plants in the park include palms, a few native eucalypts, grass plants, small grey leafed shrubs and a small planting of casuarinas south of the amphitheatre.

Wollongong City Council has had a policy in place since 1990 to purchase the commercial properties surrounding the park as they become available. Eventually, these commercial buildings will be demolished to expand the public open space.
