= MacCabe =

MacCabe may refer to:

- MacCabe (surname), origin of the names MacCabe / McCabe and a list of people with the surnames.
- MacCabe Park, a small park located in the City of Wollongong, Australia.
- MV Empire MacCabe, an oil tanker converted to a merchant aircraft carrier.
