= Warrawong =

- Suburb
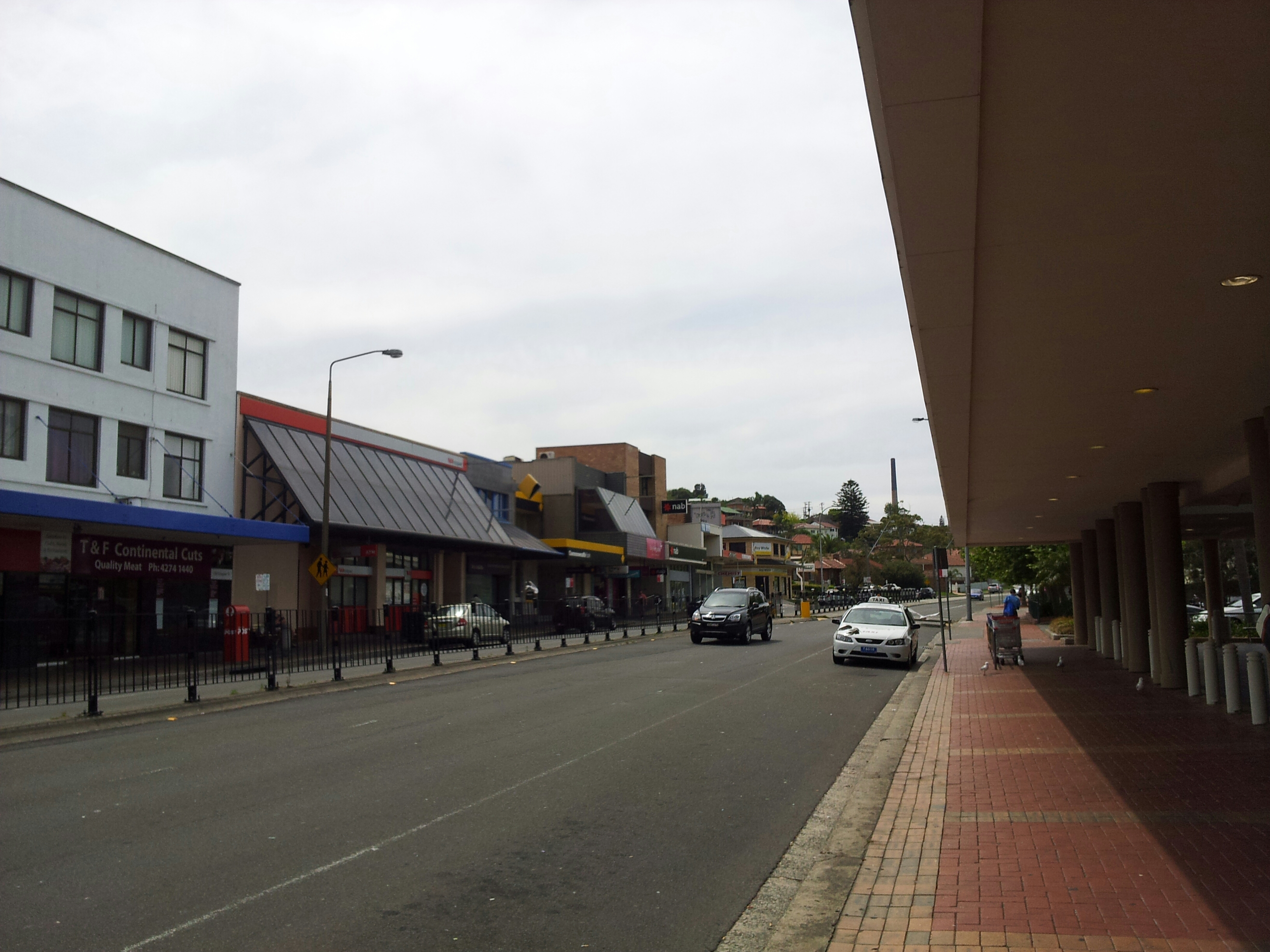

- Coordinates: 34°29′04″S 150°53′15″E
- Country: Australia
- State: New South Wales
- City: Wollongong
- LGA: City of Wollongong
- Location: 90 km (56 mi) S of Sydney; 8 km (5.0 mi) S of Wollongong; 25 km (16 mi) N of Kiama

Government
  - State electorate: Wollongong
  - Federal division: Cunningham
- Elevation: 11.8 m (39 ft)

Population
  - Total: 4,659 (2021 census)
- Postcode: 2502
Suburbs around Warrawong
Cringila	Port Kembla	Port Kembla
Lake Heights	Warrawong	Kemblawarra
	Primbee

Warrawong is a suburb of Wollongong in the Illawarra region of New South Wales, Australia. It is situated on the northeast corner of Lake Illawarra.

Warrawong is 90 kilometers from Sydney CBD.

Warrawong is home to Warrawong Plaza, one of three major regional shopping centres. Other facilities include the Port Kembla Hospital, Hoyts cinemas, and the Gala cinemas.

== History ==
Various meanings are given for the aboriginal word "Warrawong" including "a whiting", "side of a hill", " a windy place on a hill", " wind swept" and "windy hills".

Long a farming area, after the first land grants were made in the area in 1815, Warrawong began to be developed as a suburb only in the 1930s.

The Warrawong area has been known variously as Steeltown, Kembla Estate, New Kembla and finally, Warrawong.

== Demographics ==
Warrawong has a high proportion of immigrants. Of a population of 4,659, 42.8% were born overseas at the 2021 census.

Country of Birth	Number	Percentage of total inhabitants
Australia	2,665	57.2%
North Macedonia	263	5.6%
Italy	197	4.2%
Portugal	178	3.8%
England	69	1.5%
New Zealand	66	1.4%

- Aboriginal and Torres Strait Islander people made up 5.4% of the population.
- 56.2% of people spoke only English at home. Other languages spoken at home included Macedonian 8.0%, Italian 5.2%, Portuguese 3.9% and Arabic 2.2%.
- The most common responses for religion were Catholic 28.1%, No Religion 25.9%, Eastern Orthodox 9.4% and Anglican 6.7%.
