= Warrawong Plaza =

- Location: Warrawong, New South Wales, Australia
- Coordinates: 34°29′10″S 150°53′20″E
- Opened: 1960
- Manager: JLL
- Owner: Elanor Investors Group
- Num. of stores: 140
- Num. of anchor tenants: 6
- Floor area: 57,582 m^{2} (619,807 sq ft)
- Floors: 2
- Parking: 2,167 spaces
- Website: warrawongplaza.com.au

Warrawong Plaza, formerly Westfield Warrawong, is a major shopping centre located in Warrawong, Wollongong, New South Wales, Australia. With a retail floor area of 57,582 m^{2} (619,807 sq ft), it is currently the third largest shopping centre in the Illawarra region.

== History and development ==
Warrawong Plaza originally opened in 1960 as Lake Market Shopping Centre.

The centre has a current catchment area of 246,680 persons, and retail spending in the catchment area estimated at $2.3 billion (2005).

=== Redevelopments ===
Upon acquisition by the Westfield Group in 1985, the centre was extensively redeveloped and relaunched as Westfield Warrawong in 1988. Further extensions were conducted in 1996, adding a 6,000 m^{2} (64,583 sq ft) Big W to the centre.

Previously, a Big W department store had been an occupant of the centre from 1965, however due to a change in retailing strategy by parent company Woolworths, the then-two-level store was sold to David Jones on 19 April 1971 and converted to a David Jones store which in turn was closed in January 1986. By 2011, the centre had grown to 57,582 m^{2} (619,807 sq ft) with 140 retailers.

=== Acquisition by The Blackstone Group ===
In August 2015, Scentre Group announced it had sold Westfield Warrawong to 151 Property, a subsidiary of the Blackstone Group along with three other centres as part of sell-off of "non-strategic" assets for a total of $783 million. At the same time it was announced that JLL would be responsible for the management of the centre.

On 11 September 2015, the new management unveiled the new name, Warrawong Plaza, and branding going forward.

Target permanently closed on 14 January 2023 due to poor sales.

== Events ==
In 1999, the centre received significant global coverage of its efforts to deal with shoplifting and anti-social behaviour. In an effort to discourage local youth using the centre as a gathering place, the management used the centre's public address system to play older style music, including Bing Crosby's 1938 song "My Heart Is Taking Lessons".

In March 2005, local bus company Premier Illawarra gave serious consideration to suspending one of its Thursday evening services from the centre due to months of increased vandalism and anti-social behaviour in surrounding streets around the centre. Despite the efforts of bus inspectors and transit police, very little had been achieved to curb the problems.

== Transport ==
The centre is serviced by a public bus service operated by Premier Illawarra.

== Facilities ==
Major retailers of Warrawong Plaza include Coles, Aldi, Woolworths, Big W, Hoyts, TK Maxx, JB Hi-Fi, Rebel and Lincraft.
