= Wollongong Central =

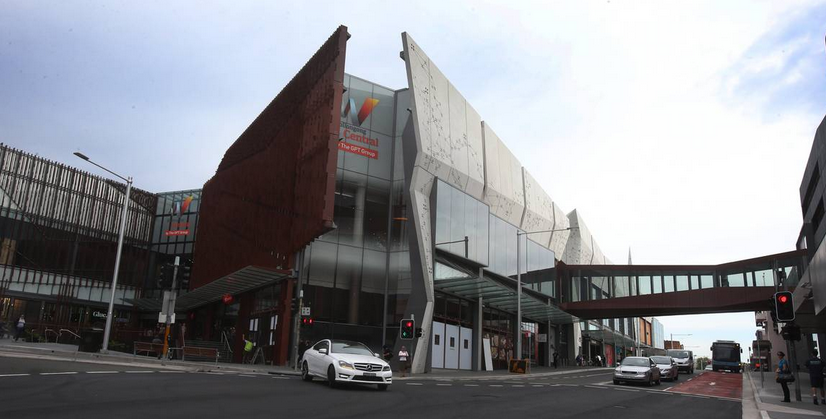
- West Kiera building of Wollongong Central
- Location: Wollongong, New South Wales, Australia
- Coordinates: 34°25′29″S 150°53′38″E
- Address: 200 Crown Street
- Opened: 1975 (Crown Central); 1986 (Gateway Shopping Centre); 1999 (Wollongong Central)
- Manager: Haben Property Fund
- Owner: 50% Haben Property Fund 50% JY Group
- Num. of stores: 212
- Num. of anchor tenants: 3
- Floor area: 59,000 m^{2} (635,071 sq ft)
- Floors: 3
- Parking: 2,100 spaces
- Public transit: Wollongong; Burelli and Kiera Streets
- Website: wollongongcentral.com.au

Wollongong Central is a large shopping centre in Wollongong, New South Wales, Australia.

== History ==
Whilst Wollongong Central today is one complete shopping centre, it was originally two separate and distinct shopping centres. Crown Central shopping centre was constructed and opened in 1975 by the Abbey Capital Property Group on the northern side of Crown Street, taking the majority of the Crown Street frontage between Keira Street and Church Street. Crown Central featured the Venture department store, Franklins supermarket, Best & Less and 30 stores.

In 1986, a joint venture between Wollongong City Council and Kern Corporation developed the Crown Gateway shopping centre on the site of the former Coles Building on the southern side of Crown Street, extending through to Burelli Street. Crown Gateway featured Grace Bros department store, Rebel Sport and 52 speciality stores.

In 1996, GPT purchased Crown Central from the council and redeveloped the food court. In 1998 GPT acquired Crown Gateway from the council. The pink arch entrance to Crown Street Mall was demolished and GPT then developed a pedestrian bridge to join the two centres, and re-branded the combined complex as Wollongong Central. The pedestrian bridge was completed in 2000.

In 2009, the North building underwent extensive $20 million interior renovations which completely revamped the interior of the building, giving it a much more modern and classier look. The renovations were met with positive feedback.

The north building was extensively modified on its western side to accommodate a pedestrian bridge linking it to the new West Keira building. The exterior of the shopping centre was also modified to match the West Keira building.

Wollongong Central was to commence construction on the $300 million expansion of the centre after successfully purchasing properties including shops and offices on Kiera Street and Crown Street in August 2008. However, plans were changed and construction started in November 2011. The expansion was to include an eight-screen cinema, food court, supermarket, underground parking and speciality stores. This development was completed on 7 October 2017. The grand opening of the centre was on 9 October 2014 with crowds and confetti on Kiera Street. The West Keira building (Building 1) is situated on the corner of Keira Street and Crown Street and has three main floors. It joins to north Building via an underground pathway and pedestrian bridge. The lower ground floor contains Coles and the first floor contains Target and JB Hi-Fi. The building also contains cafes, and restaurants outside along Keira Street. Greater Union was to open an eight-screen cinema in the complex. However, GPT dropped plans for the cinema and instead the cinema commenced its $500,000 upgrade.

The south building has few plans announced, although the GPT Group has confirmed that it will undergo delayed $30 million interior renovations similar to that of the north building. However, this development never eventuated.

On 2 October 2016, Myer closed down its store after deciding not to renew its lease. David Jones moved into the 3-level space vacated by Myer and opened on 4 October 2017. Swedish retailer H&M opened in the former space of David Jones in the north Building. The store opened on 1 September 2016. Also, in September 2016, Anaconda opened its first Illawarra store and Rebel relocated from the south Building and opened in the north Building. On 10 July 2018 Holey Moley opened its bar and mini golf venue. On 12 April 2019 B Lucky & Sons arcade and bar opened. Both these venues are located on the basement level of the south Building. Rivers and TK Maxx occupy part of the bottom level, which opens to Burelli Street to the south at ground level. The upper two levels are primarily accessed from Crown Street Mall and predominantly contain speciality stores, fashion outlets, and cafes. There is also a pedestrian bridge linking south Building to Club Lime and a carpark.

On top of the south-western corner of the north Building is a five-level office tower, previously known as Crown Tower.

In October 2021, Haben Property Fund (50%) and JY Group (50%) acquired 100% interest in the shopping centre from GPT for $402 million.

David Jones will close its store by the end of 2026.

== Future ==
GPT has concept approval for two towers to be built on top of the new West Keira building – a 10-level commercial office tower on the north-east corner, and an 18-level residential tower on the south-west corner, along with an additional two parking levels on top of the West Keira podium. There is no timetable for the construction of these towers.

== Tenants ==
Wollongong Central has 59,000m^{2} of floor space. The major retailers include David Jones, Target, Coles, Cotton On, H&M, TK Maxx, JB Hi-Fi Home, Rebel, Best & Less, Chemist Warehouse, Anaconda, and Holey Moley.

== Transport ==
The South Coast railway line offer frequent services to Wollongong railway station is a five minute walk from the centre.

Wollongong Central has bus connections to Austinmer, Bellambi, Campbelltown, Dapto, Figtree, Keiraville, Port Kembla, Stanwell Park, University of Wollongong and Warrawong, as well as the local surrounding area. The bus services depart from stops on Burelli and Kiera streets.

Wollongong Central has multi-level car parks with 2,100 spaces.
