= Municipality of North Illawarra =

- Local government area
- Country: Australia
- State: New South Wales
- Region: Illawarra
- Abolished: 24 September 1947

The Municipality of North Illawarra was a local government area in the Illawarra region of New South Wales, Australia. It covered the area from Fairy Meadow to Bellambi.

Its council chambers were at Fairy Meadow, in a building that has since been repurposed.

The shire was amalgamated with the then-Municipality of Wollongong, Bulli Shire and Central Illawarra Shire to form a Municipality of Greater Wollongong, which was at the same time proclaimed as the City of Greater Wollongong, on 24 September 1947.

== Election results ==
=== 1944 ===
1944 New South Wales local elections: North Illawarra
Party	Candidate	Votes	%	±%
Independent	C. W. Carr (elected)	1,533		
Independent	D. A. Amour (elected)	1,434		
Independent	C. W. Smith (elected)	1,296		
Communist	Jack Martin (elected)	1,225		
Independent	W. L. Vidler (elected)	1,221		
Independent	J. L. Dawson (elected)	1,075		
Independent	G. C. C. Rowland (elected)	1,071		
Independent	T. Dalton (elected)	1,047		
Independent	O. J. T. Murphy (elected)	1,041		
Independent	A. Marshall	1,025		
Independent	F. B. McMahon	976		
Independent	J, Campbell	969		
Independent	W. T. Hopwood	962		
Independent	W. J. T. Mascord	859		
Independent	T. B. G. Ward	827		
Independent	A. T. Ziems	816		
Independent	R. G. Hall	744		
Independent	T. Silcocks	738		
Independent	A. R. Wales	731		
Independent	G. Parker	714		
Independent	C. E. Tyler-White	617		
Independent	E. Downie	404		
Independent	W. A. G. Pollock	232		
Independent	W. P. Devlin	190		
Independent	R. Stibbard	132		
