= Windang =

- Suburb
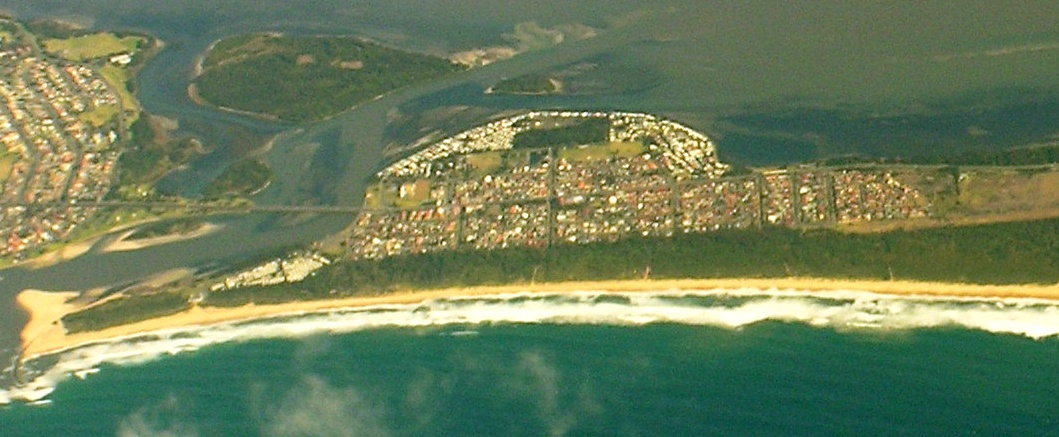
- Aerial view from east

- Coordinates: 34°31′S 150°52′E
- Country: Australia
- State: New South Wales
- City: Wollongong
- LGA: City of Wollongong
- Location: 98 km (61 mi) S of Sydney; 14 km (8.7 mi) S of Wollongong; 19 km (12 mi) N of Kiama

Government
  - State electorate: Wollongong
  - Federal division: Cunningham
- Elevation: 4 m (13 ft)

Population
  - Total: 2,610 (2021 census)
- Postcode: 2528
Suburbs around Windang
Lake Illawarra	Primbee	Pacific Ocean
Lake Illawarra	Windang	Pacific Ocean
Lake Illawarra	Lake Illawarra	Pacific Ocean

Windang is a suburb of Wollongong, New South Wales, Australia, on the southern tip of the peninsula guarding the ocean entrance to Lake Illawarra. Windang is popular for its fishing, prawning, boating, surfing, windsurfing and yachting. Windang is 98 km south of Sydney, approximately 20 minutes drive south of the Wollongong central business district and seven minutes from Shellharbour.

== History ==
Windang is an Aboriginal word meaning "scene of a fight".

Windang (also known as Berrwarra Point) was an Aboriginal reserve from the 1880s until around 1920. The main site of the reserve is now occupied by the Windang Beach Tourist Park.

William Turnbull purchased land in the area in 1920 and erected a two-story building called "Wyndang House".

In 1926 the post office attached to this house was officially named Windang Post Office following a submission from Turnbull to have the name changed from the unofficial Lake Illawarra Post Office. The request was granted on the proviso that "the correct spelling be adopted namely Windang, which is that of the Island and Trigonometrical Station thereon in the vicinity".

Tourism and recreational fishing have always been of major importance in the area. Guest houses sprang up in the 1930s to cater for the tourist trade, and the Windang Camping Reserves have never ceased to be popular.

The popular Australian garage rock band Hockey Dad reside in Windang, often referencing their love for the suburb during live concerts, in recorded music, and in their music videos.

UFC Featherweight Champion Alexander Volkanovski fights out of Windang.

Windang has been notorious for the number of drownings that occur in the area; in 2011, a 19-year-old man drowned whilst rock-fishing in the area.
