= Bulli Shire =

Former local government area in New South Wales, Australia

- Local government area
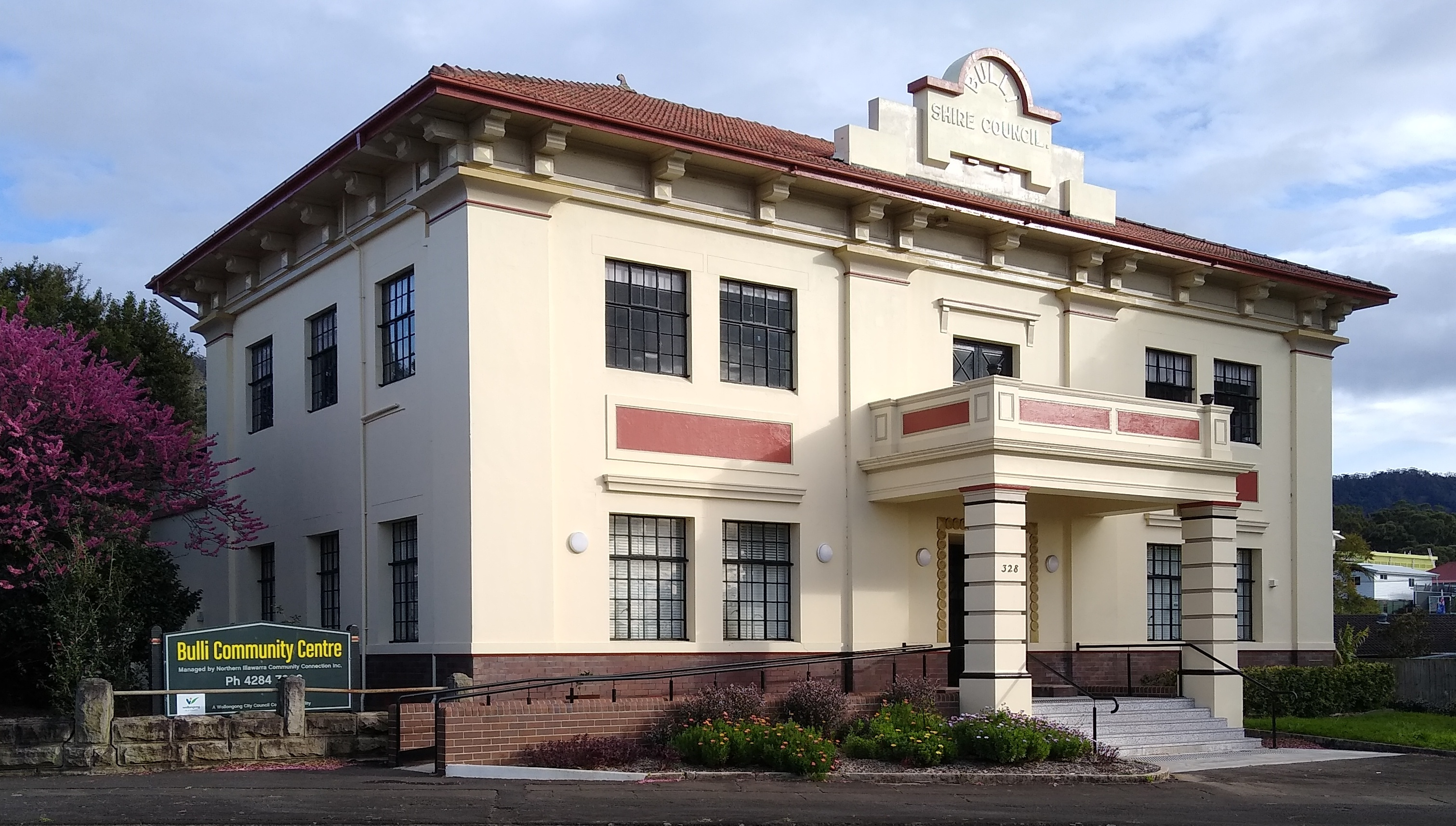
- Former Bulli Shire Council Chambers, a heritage-listed building, pictured in 2022
- Country: Australia
- State: New South Wales
- Region: Illawarra
- Established: 7 March 1906
- Abolished: 24 September 1947
- Council seat: Bulli

Bulli Shire was a local government area in the Illawarra region of New South Wales, Australia.

Bulli Shire was proclaimed on 7 March 1906, one of 134 shires created after the passing of the Local Government (Shires) Act 1905.

The shire offices were in Bulli. Other urban areas in the shire included Austinmer, Helensburgh and Woonona.

The shire was amalgamated with the then Municipality of Wollongong, Municipality of North Illawarra and Shire of Central Illawarra, to form a Municipality of Greater Wollongong, which was at the same time proclaimed as the City of Greater Wollongong, on 24 September 1947.
