= Crown Street, Wollongong =

Street in New South Wales, Australia

Crown Street New South Wales
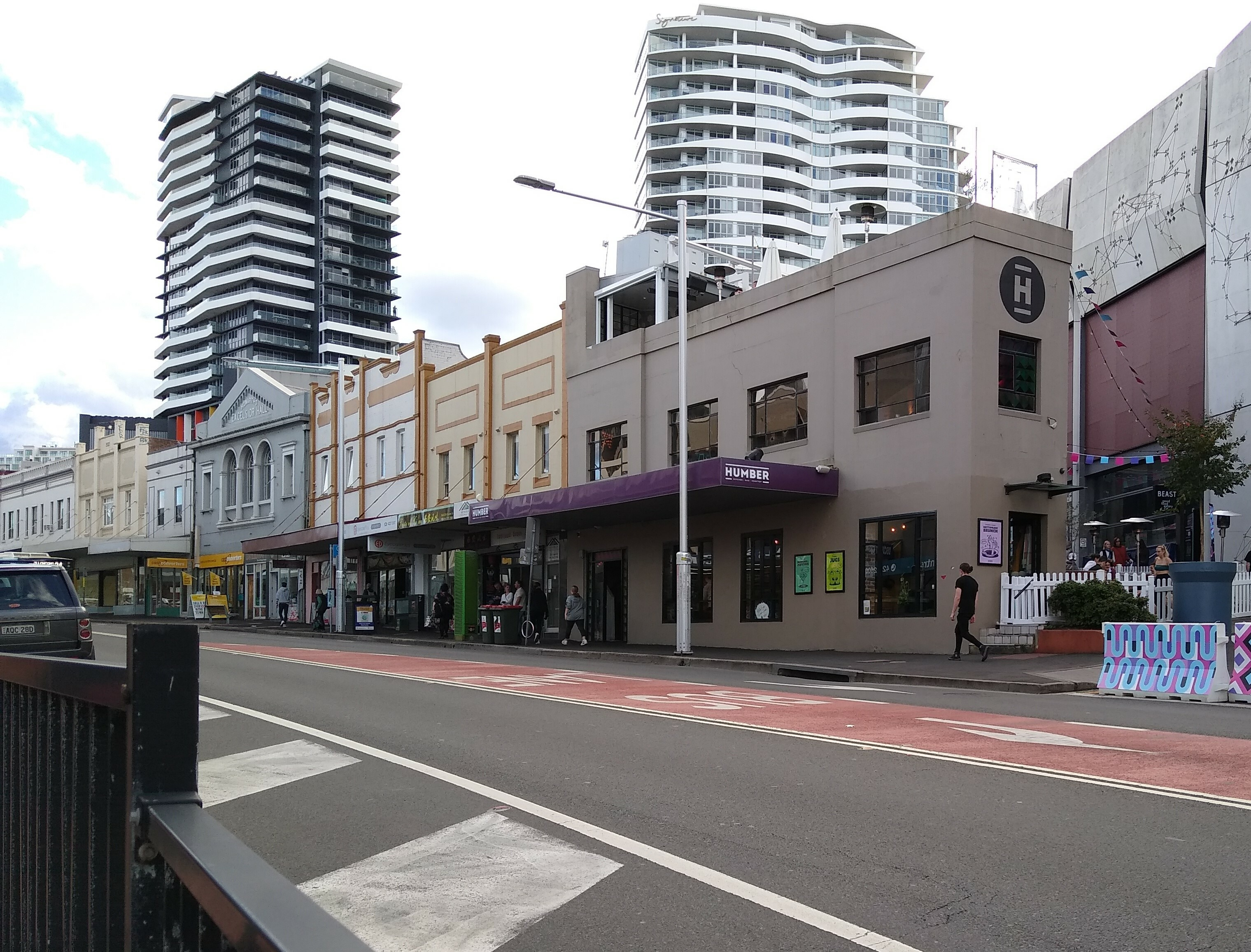
- Crown Street
- Coordinates: 34.425672°S 150.871260°E (West end); 34.426388°S 150.903885°E (East end)

General information
- Type: Road
- Length: 3.1 km (1.9 mi)
- Former route number: State Route 60 (1989–2004); Alt National Route 1 (1975–1989); National Route 1 (1955–1975) (West Wollongong – Wollongong)

Major junctions
- West end: Princes Highway; West Wollongong
- Mount Keira Road; Keira Street; Corrimal Street
- East end: Marine Drive; Wollongong

Location(s)
- LGA(s): City of Wollongong
- Major suburbs: Wollongong

Crown Street is the main street in the city of Wollongong, New South Wales. It was created in the early 19th century from a cattle track which follows a ridge from Mount Keira to the first farm house in the area, and quickly became the "main" street of the then-town.

Today Crown Street is the main arterial route through Wollongong from the southern suburbs to the north east. Along its route it features Wollongong Hospital, the Piccadilly Centre, Wollongong railway station, and the now-abandoned PMG building. Crown Street has also now become a major shopping district after being partially converted into a mall in the mid 1980s.

== Crown Street Mall ==
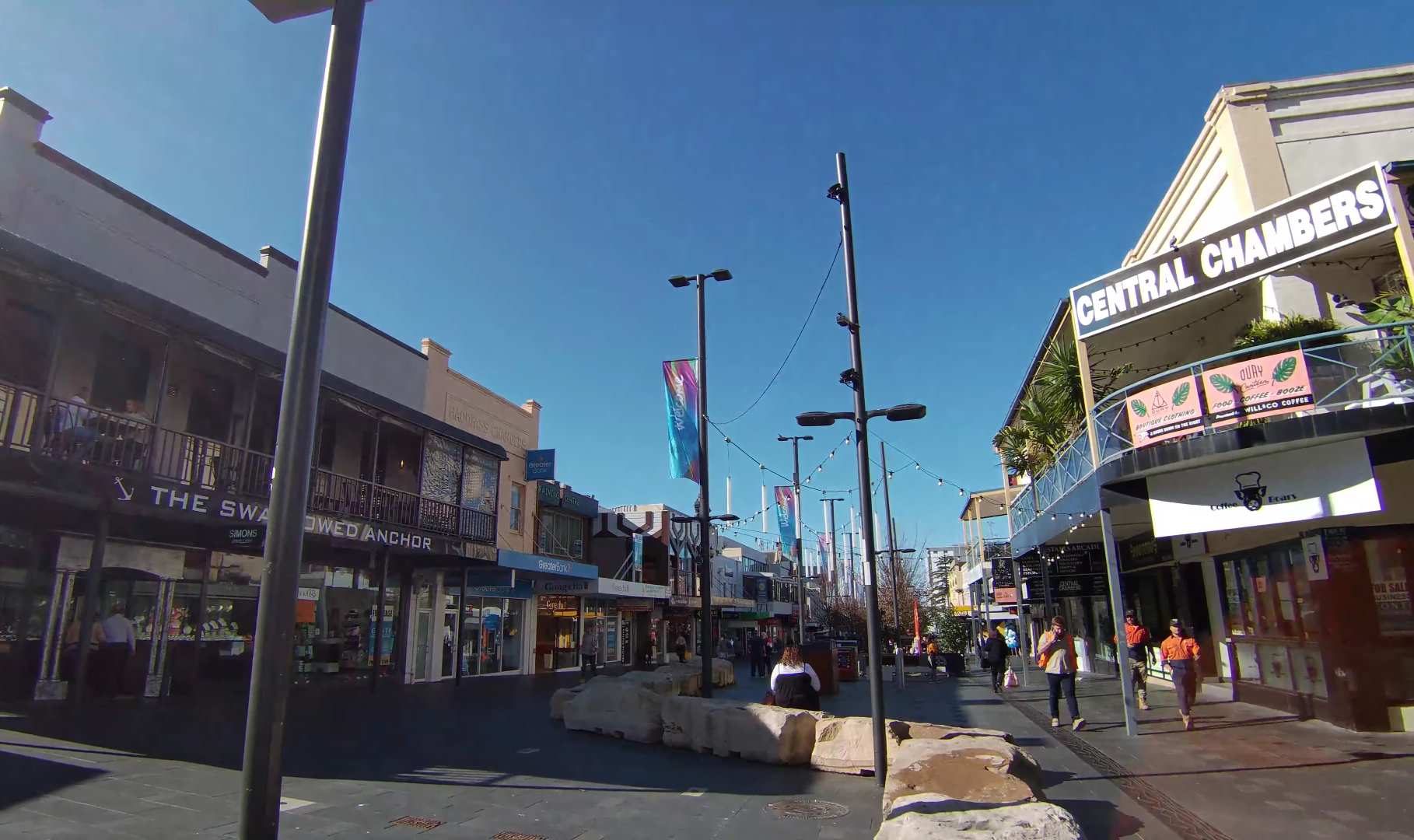
Crown Street Mall

The pedestrian-only zone of Crown Street Mall stretches from the corner of Crown and Keira Streets in the west to the corner of Crown and Kembla Streets in the east – these cross streets being named after the local mountains Mount Keira and Mount Kembla respectively. The mall had originally included two distinctive archways as well as several fountains and architectural features, however the archways on the junction of Crown and Keira Streets have since been demolished to make room for a pedestrian bridge. There is currently a revitalisation scheme under way that includes converting this area to al fresco dining for night shoppers. Opening the mall to slow moving traffic has also been considered.

The two main buildings are the North Building (formerly Crown Central) and the South Building (formerly Crown Gateway). They both started as independent shopping centres but are now joined as part of Wollongong Central. Wollongong Central also occupies, West Keira, a new building on Keira Street which joins to the North Building by foot bridge and tunnel. South Building used to have a food court but this was replaced by a medical centre in the early 21st century, and the area is now a Rivers menswear outlet.

The council has announced that the mall would go through a major facelift beginning in early 2012. The facelift was completed in October 2014.

Each Friday the lower mall area is converted into a local market.
