= Macquarie Rivulet =

Coordinates: 34°33′S 150°48′E

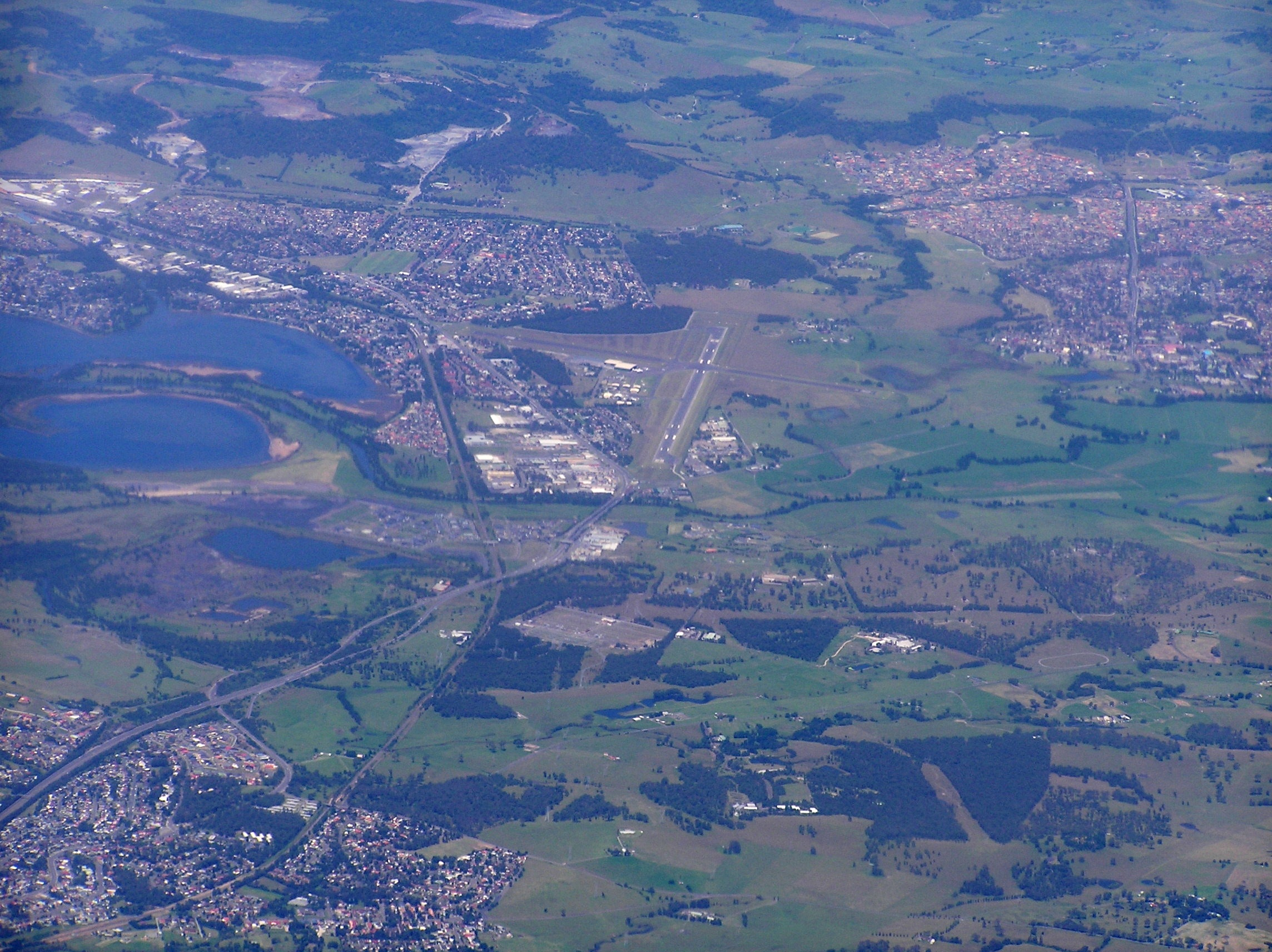
- Aerial view showing Macqurie Rivulet entering Lake Illawarra via the curved channel at left.
- Etymology: In honour of Lachlan Macquarie

Location
- Country: Australia
- State: New South Wales
- Region: Sydney Basin (IBRA), Southern Highlands, Illawarra
- Local government areas: Wingecarribee, City of Shellharbour

Physical characteristics
- Source: Illawarra escarpment
  - location: near Robertson
- Mouth: Lake Illawarra
  - location: east of Yallah
- Length: 23 km (14 mi)

Basin features
- National park: Macquarie Pass NP

Macquarie Rivulet is a perennial river located in the Southern Highlands and Illawarra regions of New South Wales, Australia.

== Location and features ==
Macquarie Rivulet rises within the Macquarie Pass National Park on the eastern slopes of the Illawarra escarpment and drains the eastern edge of the Southern Highlands plateau. The headwaters of the rivulet gather approximately 4 kilometres (2.5 mi) northeast of the town of Robertson and north of the Macquarie Pass. The rivulet flows generally east by north before reaching its mouth within Lake Illawarra, east of the Shellharbour suburb of Yallah.

The Princes Highway crosses the Macquarie Rivulet at Yallah.

== See also ==
- List of rivers of Australia § New South Wales
- List of rivers of New South Wales (L–Z)
- Mount Murray
- Rivers of New South Wales
