= Lake Illawarra =

Lake in New South Wales, Australia

- Illawarra Lake
- Elouera (Dharawal); Eloura (Dharawal); Allowrie (Dharawal); Illa (Dharawal); Wurra (Dharawal); Warra (Dharawal)
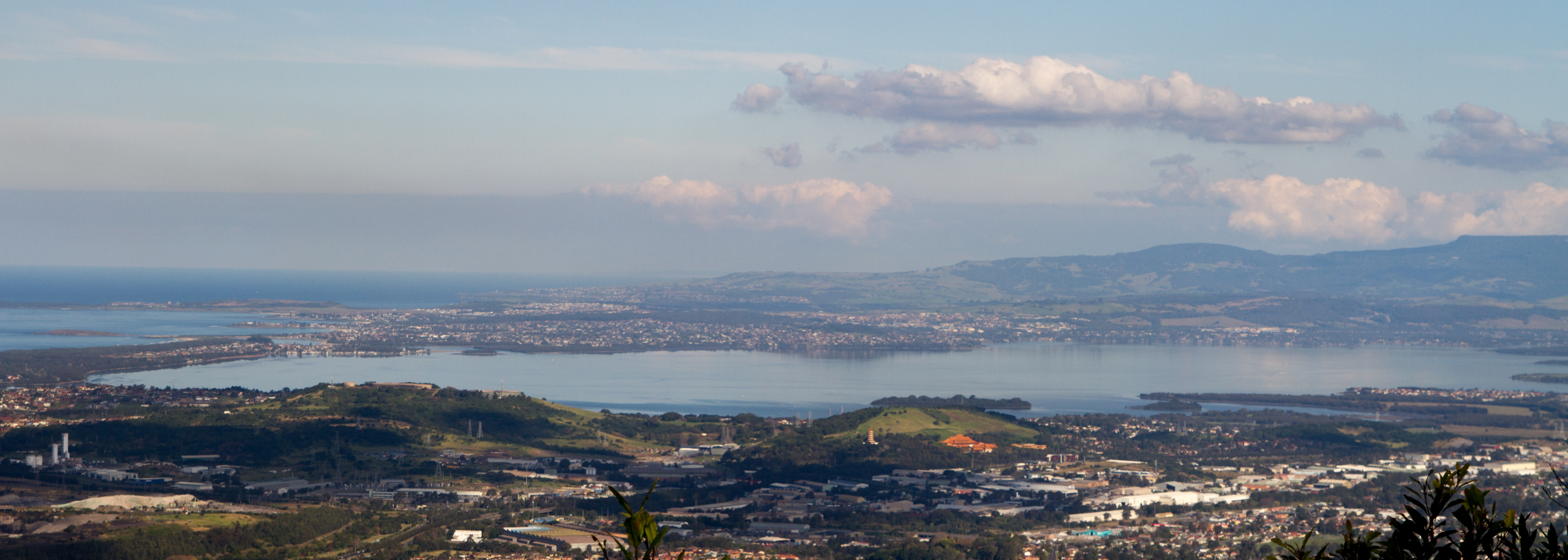
- Lake Illawarra, viewed from Sublime Point lookout, 2015.

- Location of Lake Illawarra in New South Wales
- Location: Illawarra, New South Wales
- Coordinates: 34°31′25″S 150°50′04″E
- Type: An open and trained intermediate wave dominated barrier estuary
- Primary inflows: Macquarie Rivulet, Mullet Creek
- Primary outflows: Tom Thumb Entrance, Tasman Sea
- Catchment area: 238 km^{2} (92 sq mi)
- Basin countries: Australia
- Managing agency: Lake Illawarra Authority
- Surface area: 35.8 km^{2} (13.8 sq mi)
- Average depth: 2.1 metres (6 ft 11 in)
- Water volume: 74,275 ML (2,623.0×10^{6} cu ft)
- Surface elevation: 0.3 metres (1 ft 0 in) AHD
- Frozen: never
- Settlements: Wollongong; Shellharbour

Lake Illawarra (Aboriginal Tharawal language: various adaptions of Elouera, Eloura, or Allowrie; Illa, Wurra, or Warra meaning pleasant place near the sea, or, high place near the sea, or, white clay mountain) is an open and trained intermediate wave dominated barrier estuary or large coastal lagoon. It is located in the Illawarra region of New South Wales, situated about 100 kilometres (62 mi) south of Sydney, Australia.

Until 2014, the lake environment was administered by the Lake Illawarra Authority (LIA), a New South Wales statutory authority established pursuant to the Lake Illawarra Authority Act 1987 (NSW) with the aim of transforming the degraded waters and foreshores of Lake Illawarra into an attractive recreational and tourist resource. In 2014, the LIA was replaced by the Lake Illawarra Estuary Management Committee (LIEMC), including representatives from Wollongong and Shellharbour City Councils, as well as independent scientific advisors, community members, and local Aboriginal representatives.

== Location and features ==
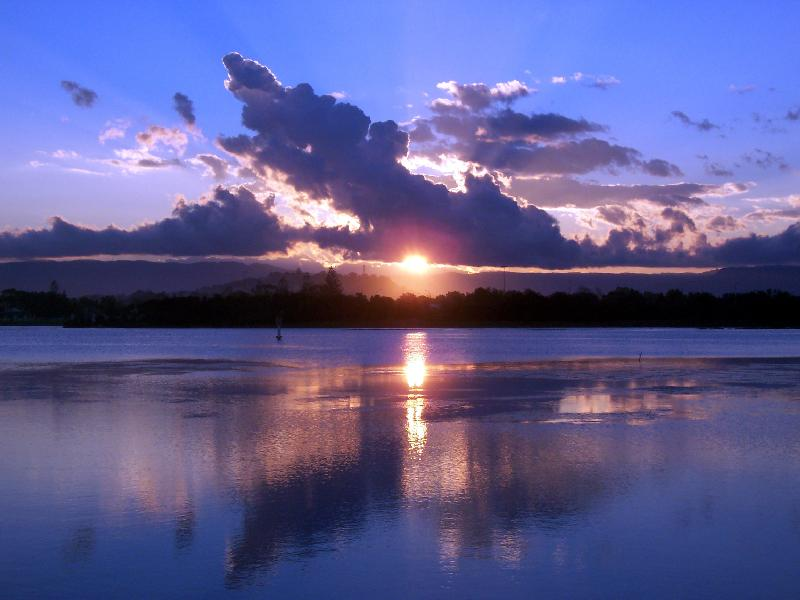
Sunset over Lake Illawarra, 2008

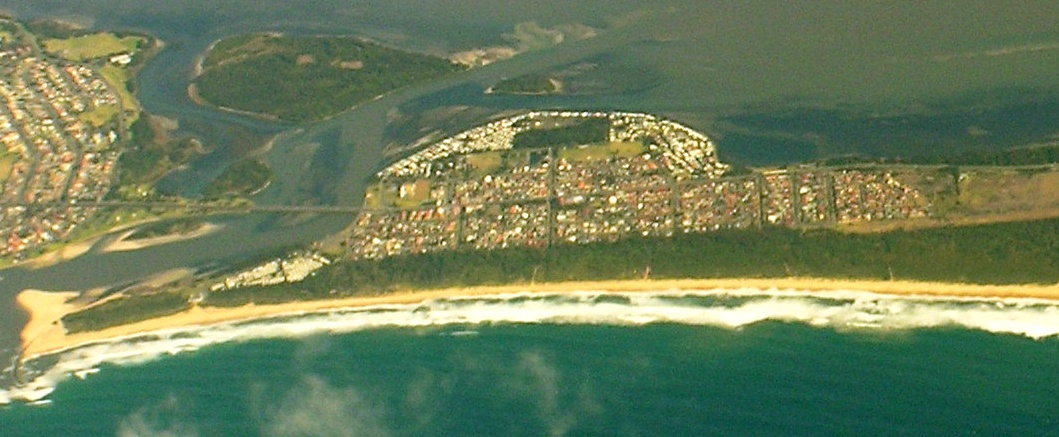
Entrance to Lake Illawarra, at Windang, 2008

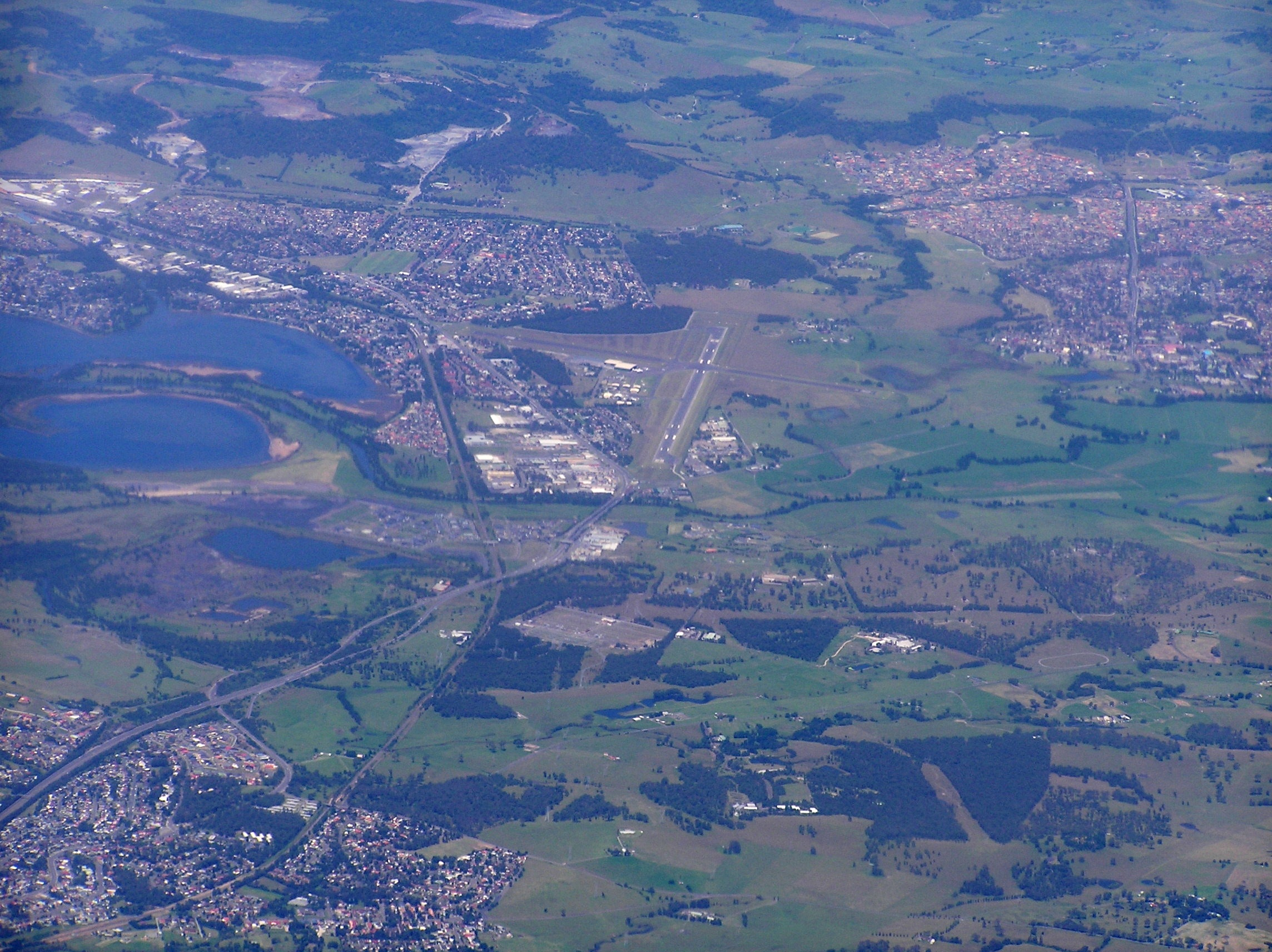
Aerial photo of Lake Illawarra, Albion Park and Albion Park Rail

Located south of the city of Wollongong, north of the city of Shellharbour, and 5 kilometres (3.1 mi) northeast of Dapto, Lake Illawarra receives runoff from the Illawarra escarpment through Macquarie Rivulet and Mullet Creek, drawing from a catchment area of 238 square kilometres (92 sq mi). With an average depth of 2.1 metres (6 ft 11 in), the relatively shallow lake, brought about because of infilling by sand which has been eroded from the surrounding catchments, covers a surface area of 35.8 square kilometres (13.8 sq mi). At an elevation of 0.3 metres (1 ft 0 in) AHD, the maximum volume of water held in the lake is 74,275 megalitres (2,623.0×10^{6} cu ft).

The narrow tidal entrance to the Tasman Sea of the South Pacific Ocean is located at Windang. Before 2007, Lake Illawarra was frequently closed to the sea. The lake system received large amounts of nutrient and sediment from the catchment which tended to remain within the lake. Water levels within the lake also fluctuated greatly, affecting the local flora species. In July 2007 the Lake Illawarra Authority completed works on training the entrance of the lake to create a permanent opening to the sea.

The natural gas-powered Tallawarra Power Station is located on the western shore of Lake Illawarra at Yallah. The power station draws water from the lake for cooling purposes, and returns water to the lake via an onsite water management system that ensures water quality is maintained at levels above the catchment average.

The lake's location within the sprawling Wollongong urban area means that Lake Illawarra is vulnerable to pollution and urban run-off.

=== Recreation ===
Lake Illawarra is popular for recreational fishing, prawning and sailing. On 12 January 2009, it was suspected a man was bitten by a bull shark whilst snorkelling at Windang, near the mouth of Lake Illawarra.

Birds found at the lake include pelicans, cormorants, musk ducks, hoary-headed grebes, black swans, black ducks, grey teal ducks, herons, ibises and spoonbills.

== History ==
The traditional custodians of the land surrounding what is now known as Lake Illawarra are the Aboriginal Tharawal and Wadi Wadi peoples. Lake Illawarra was a valuable source of food and spirituality. Burial sites and middens discovered at Windang and surrounding areas indicate that the Wadi Wadi used the area extensively and performed various corroborees and ceremonies in the area. The name Illawarra is derived from various adaptions of the Aboriginal Tharawal language words of elouera, eloura, or allowrie; illa, wurra, or warra mean generally a pleasant place near the sea, or high place near the sea, or white clay mountain.

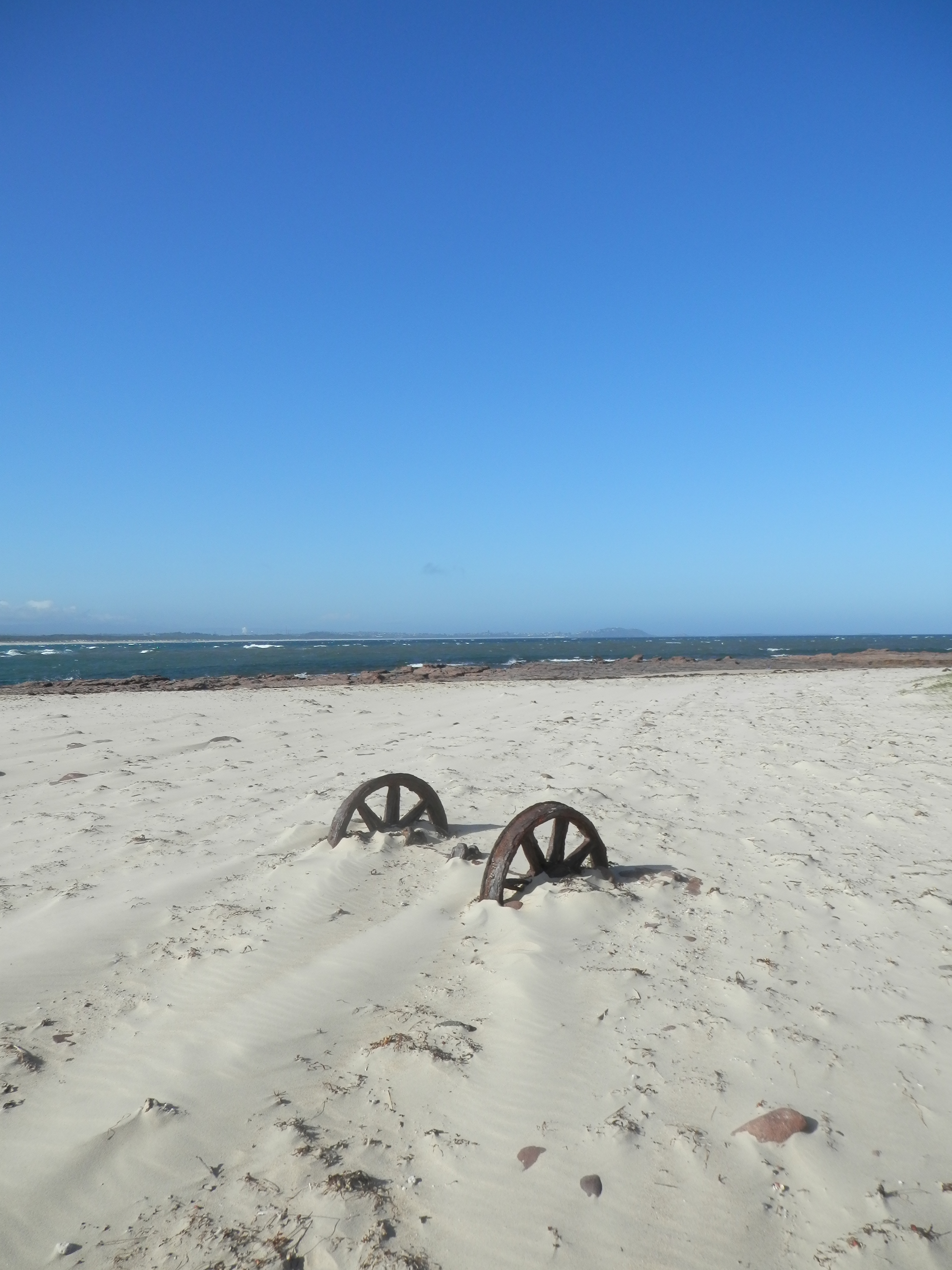
A sets of rail wagon wheels near Windang Island (2015)

Matthew Flinders and George Bass named the lake Tom Thumb's Lagoon on Flinders' chart after their small boat, the Tom Thumb, when they visited the area in March 1796.

A deep water port on Lake Illawarra, to be known as Illawarra Harbour, was to have been developed by a company known as Illawarra Harbour and Land Corporation. Enabling legislation was passed in 1890, and they did actually complete some work for the development. A railway was constructed from the planned site of the 'Ocean View' Colliery to Tallawarra Point, where the company had land and intended to develop the port and a township. The railway crossed, but was also connected to, the South Coast railway, near the location of Dapto railway station. Some limited work was done on a breakwater at the entrance of the lake at Windang. However, the dredged channel across Lake Illawarra and the wharves at Elizabeth Point were not constructed, no coal was ever shipped, and the mine and jetty scheme was abandoned in 1902. In 1898, the entire Illawarra harbour project was superseded by a NSW Government decision to develop an artificial harbour and port, at Port Kembla, which was then constructed between 1901 and 1937. All that remains of the Lake Illawarra port scheme are some corroded railway wagon wheels, near Windang Island and some of the partially-constructed 'tie bar' to the island, later damaged by storms.

In Lake Illawarra: an ongoing history, Joseph Davis provides a wide-ranging environmental and historical biography of the lake and its foreshores. The book also contains many images and photographs depicting the lake. Davis edited John Brown of Brownsville: his manuscripts, letterbook and the records of Dapto Show Society 1857–1904 that deals with the man who did most to protect the vegetation of the lake islands, and he authored Gooseberry & Hooka: the island reserves of Lake Illawarra 1829–1947, the latter examining the records of John Brown and others and deals with the history of these two islands and how they survived to become nature refuges rather than recreation reserves.

== See also ==
- List of lakes of Australia
- Lake Illawarra High School
