= City of Wollongong =

- Local government area
- Location in the Illawarra

- Interactive map of City of Wollongong
- Coordinates: 34°25′S 150°53′E
- Country: Australia
- State: New South Wales
- Region: Illawarra
- Established: 1942 (as the City of Wollongong)
- Council seat: Wollongong

Government
  - Lord Mayor: Tania Brown
  - State electorates: Wollongong; Keira; Shellharbour; Heathcote
  - Federal divisions: Cunningham; Whitlam

Area
  - Total: 684 km^{2} (264 sq mi)

Population
  - Total: 214,564 (2021) (19th)
  - Density: 313.69/km^{2} (812.5/sq mi)
- Website: City of Wollongong
LGAs around City of Wollongong
Campbelltown & Wollondilly	Sutherland	Tasman Sea
Wingecarribee	City of Wollongong	Tasman Sea
Wingecarribee	Shellharbour	Tasman Sea

The City of Wollongong is a local government area in the Illawarra region of New South Wales, Australia. The area is situated adjacent to the Tasman Sea, the Princes Motorway and the Illawarra railway line.

Located 80 kilometres (50 mi) south of Sydney, the City of Wollongong covers 684 square kilometres (264 sq mi) and occupies a narrow coastal strip bordered by the Royal National Park to the north, Lake Illawarra to the south, the Tasman Sea to the east and the Illawarra escarpment to the west.

Councillor Tania Brown was elected as Lord Mayor of the City of Wollongong in the New South Wales local government elections, held in September 2024.

== Localities ==
The area covers the northern and central suburbs of Wollongong, bounded by Helensburgh in the north, the Illawarra escarpment to the west, and by Macquarie Rivulet (Yallah, Haywards Bay) and the Lake Illawarra entrance (Windang) to the south.

== Demographics ==
At the 2021 census, there were 214,564 people in the City of Wollongong local government area, of these 49.2 per cent were male and 50.8 per cent were female. Aboriginal and Torres Strait Islander people made up 3.2 per cent of the population, which was marginally lower than the state average of 3.4 per cent. The median age of people in the City of Wollongong was 38 years, slightly above the national median. Children aged 0 – 14 years made up 17.5 per cent of the population and people aged 65 years and over made up 18.6 per cent of the population. Of people in the area aged 15 years and over, 44.6 per cent were married and 11.9 per cent were either divorced or separated.

Population growth in the City of Wollongong between the 2001 census and the 2006 census was 2.14 per cent; and in the subsequent five years to the 2011 census, population growth was 4.45 per cent. In the subsequent ten years to the 2021 census, population growth was -2.23 per cent. When compared with total population growth of Australia for the same periods, being 5.78 per cent and 8.32 per cent and 0.98 per cent respectively, population growth in the City of Wollongong local government area was significantly lower than the national average. The median weekly income for residents within the City of Wollongong was marginally lower than the national average. The forecast population growth from 2021 to 2046 is approximately 1.24% per annum.

At the 2021 census, the proportion of residents in the City of Wollongong local government area who stated their ancestry as Australian or Anglo-Celtic exceeded 90.6 per cent of all residents (national average was 81 per cent). In excess of 53% of all residents in the City of Wollongong nominated a religious affiliation with Christianity at the 2021 census, which was slightly higher than the national average of 43.9 per cent. Meanwhile, as at the census date, compared to the national average, households in the City of Wollongong local government area had a lower than average proportion (19.3 per cent) where two or more languages are spoken (national average was 24.8 per cent); and a higher proportion (79.8 per cent) where English only was spoken at home (national average was 72.0 per cent).

Selected historical census data for the City of Wollongong local government area
Census year		2001	2006	2011	2021
Population	Estimated residents on Census night	180,358	184,212	192,418	219,141
Population	LGA rank in terms of size within New South Wales				10th
Population	% of New South Wales population			2.78%	▼2.55%
Population	% of Australian population	0.96%	▼0.93%	▼0.89%	▼0.77%
Cultural and language diversity					
Ancestry, top responses	Australian			26.9%	34.7%
Ancestry, top responses	English			25.8%	35.8%
Ancestry, top responses	Irish			7.3%	10.3%
Ancestry, top responses	Scottish			6.8%	9.8%
Ancestry, top responses	Italian			4.6%	6.1%
Language, top responses (other than English)	Macedonian	3.2%	▼2.9%	▼2.7%	▼2.1%
Language, top responses (other than English)	Italian	2.9%	▼2.5%	▼2.2%	▼1.4%
Language, top responses (other than English)	Arabic	n/c	▲0.8%	▲1.1%	▲1.4%
Language, top responses (other than English)	Mandarin	n/c	n/c	▲1.1%	1.1%
Language, top responses (other than English)	Greek	1.2%	▼1.1%	▼0.9%	n/c
Religious affiliation					
Religious affiliation, top responses	Catholic	29.6%	▼28.9%	▼28.2%	25.6%
Religious affiliation, top responses	Anglican	23.7%	▼22.5%	▼20.9%	16.6%
Religious affiliation, top responses	No Religion	11.8%	▲14.9%	▲19.6%	27.8%
Religious affiliation, top responses	Eastern Orthodox	6.3%	▼6.1%	▼5.8%	4.3%
Religious affiliation, top responses	Uniting Church	5.9%	▼5.3%	▼4.6%	
Median weekly incomes					
Personal income	Median weekly personal income		A$391	▲A$489	▲A$754
Personal income	% of Australian median income		83.9%	▲84.7%	▲93.6
Family income	Median weekly family income		A$1,149	▲A$1,426	▲A$2,151
Family income	% of Australian median income		98.1%	▼96.3%	▲101.5%
Household income	Median weekly household income		A$933	▲A$1,101	▲A$1,682
Household income	% of Australian median income		90.8%	▼89.2%	▲93.2%

== Council history ==
The name Wollongong originated from the Aboriginal word woolyungah meaning five islands. Archeological evidence indicates that Aboriginals have lived here for at least 30,000 years. Wodi Wodi is the tribe name of the Aboriginal people of the Illawarra. Dr Charles Throsby first established a settlement in the area in 1815, bringing down his cattle from the Southern Highlands to a lagoon of fresh water located near South Beach. The earliest reference to Wollongong was in 1826, in a report written by John Oxley, about the local cedar industry. The area's first school was established in 1833, and just one year later the Surveyor-General arrived from Sydney to lay out the township of Wollongong on property owned by Charles Throsby Smith.

The local steel industry commenced in 1927 with Charles Hoskins entering into an agreement with the New South Wales Government to build a steelworks at Port Kembla, thereby commencing a long history of steel production that still continues to this day. Operations began in 1930 with one blast furnace of 800 tons capacity. In 1936, BHP acquired Australian Iron & Steel and production at Port Kembla increased rapidly. The steel industry was a catalyst for growth for many decades, and laid the foundations for the city's economy, lifestyle and culture.

=== Administrative history ===
Local government in the Illawarra region started with the passage of the District Councils Act 1842 (NSW), which allowed for limited local government in the form of a warden and between 3 and 12 councillors to be appointed by the Governor. Between July and September 1843, 28 such entities had been proclaimed by Governor George Gipps—the Illawarra District Council, the 17th to be declared, was proclaimed on 24 August 1843, with a population of 4,044 and an area of 1,708 square kilometres (659 sq mi) covering the coastal plain from Bulli to Nowra and including inland districts such as Kangaroo Valley. Due to various factors, the District Councils were ineffective, and most had ceased to operate by the end of the decade.

The Municipalities Act 1858 (NSW), which gave the councils more authority and which allowed for residents to petition for incorporation of areas and also to elect councillors, met with somewhat greater success. On 22 February 1859, the Municipality of Wollongong, with an area of 8 square kilometres (3 sq mi) and a population of 1,200, became the first to be proclaimed under the Act in New South Wales, with 114 residents in favour and none against. The first elections were held on 29 March 1859, with John Garrett becoming the first mayor of Wollongong.

Other entities sprang into existence thereafter to service the surrounding region. The first, on 19 August 1859, was the Central Illawarra Municipality, which extended over 339.5 square kilometres (131.1 sq mi) from Unanderra (west of Wollongong) to Macquarie Rivulet, and had a population of 2,500. After an unsuccessful attempt by Wollongong to claim the area, the region from Fairy Meadow to Bellambi separately incorporated as North Illawarra on 26 October 1868. Finally, the Shire of Bulli was proclaimed further north on 15 May 1906.

Wollongong was proclaimed as a city on 11 September 1942 by the Governor of New South Wales Baron Wakehurst. There was considerable pressure for amalgamation of the Illawarra area, which had transformed from a disparate rural area with some coastal towns into an increasingly urban-industrial region, and on 12 September 1947, the City of Wollongong, the Shires of Bulli and Central Illawarra, and the Municipality of North Illawarra amalgamated to form the City of Greater Wollongong under the Local Government Act 1919 (NSW). The new City of Greater Wollongong took effect from 24 September 1947 and was proclaimed by notice in the New South Wales Government Gazette by John Northcott, Governor of New South Wales.

On 10 April 1970, a Lord Mayoralty was conferred on the city by Queen Elizabeth II, and on 30 October 1970, the City reverted to the name "City of Wollongong".

Its motto is "Urbs Inter Mare Montemque"—"City Between the Mountains and the Sea". Its corporate slogan is "City of Innovation".

=== 2008 corruption inquiry ===
In February 2008, both elected officers and staff of Wollongong City Council were the centre of a major Independent Commission Against Corruption (ICAC) inquiry. The inquiry revealed favourable treatment of local developers by certain council staff. The inquiry heard evidence that a council planner had been sexually involved with three developers whilst assessing their developments. There was also evidence presented of an impersonation of ICAC officers and plans of intimidation. This attracted significant media attention and renewed calls for tightening of rules of developer donations to political parties. The Premier Morris Iemma also agreed that rules would be tightened as several of his Ministers were implicated in this scandal. On 4 March 2008, following recommendations from Commissioner Jerrold Cripps QC, the Minister for Local Government requested the Governor of New South Wales to dismiss the council and install a panel of administrators (Gabrielle Kibble, Dr Colin Gellatly and Robert McGregor) for four years citing clear evidence of systemic corruption in council.

In October 2008, the ICAC referred briefs of evidence in relation to all eleven persons found to have acted corruptly to the Office of the Director of Public Prosecutions (DPP). After considering the evidence available, the DPP commenced action and was successful in recording convictions for three of the eleven people ICAC found to have acted in a corrupt manner. A summary of the individuals concerned, and the determinations made by the Courts are as follows:

Individual	Role	Details of ICAC recommendations to the DPP	Criminal findings	Sentence
Frank Vellar	Property Developer	various offences including offences under s. 249B(2) of corruptly giving benefits to Ms Morgan in return for her giving him favourable treatment to his DAs	Found guilty of three charges of giving false or misleading evidence to ICAC and one charge of fabricating a document. A further false or misleading evidence charge was dismissed.	He served a 10-month sentence via an intensive correctional order, was fined $3000 and given a two-year good behaviour bond.
Bulent "Glen" Tabak	Property Developer	various offences including under s.249B(2) of the Crimes Act for corruptly giving benefits to Ms Morgan and Mr Scimone	On 6 July 2010, Mr Tabak was found guilty of an offence of wilfully make false statement to the commission or a commission officer, contrary to section 80(c) of the ICAC Act [a further matter was taken into account in accordance with Division 3 of the Crimes (Sentencing Procedure) Act 1999]. On 13 September 2010 Mr Tabak appealed against his conviction and sentence. The Judge dismissed the appeal and upheld the conviction and sentence.	He was fined $2500 and given a two-year good behaviour bond.
Frank Gigliotti	Former Councillor of Wollongong City Council	for offences under s.249B(1) of the Crimes Act of corruptly soliciting a benefit from Mr Vellar and under s.80(c) of the ICAC Act for wilfully making a false statement to or misleading the Commission	Faced seven charges. Three were withdrawn, he was acquitted of one and found not guilty of another. He was found guilty of two counts of giving false or misleading evidence to ICAC.	He served four months in prison.

The NSW Government installed administrators to run the council. Dr Col Gellatly, Robert McGregor and Gabrielle Kibble were appointed to the administrator roles, but as of January 2010 Mrs Kibble resigned and was replaced by Richard Colley. Following the passing and assent of the Local Government (Shellharbour and Wollongong Elections) Act, 2011 (NSW), local government elections were re-instituted in 2011, and a new Council elected, replacing the administrators.

=== Proposed amalgamation ===
A 2015 review of local government boundaries recommended that the City of Wollongong merge with the City of Shellharbour to form a new council with an area of 831 square kilometres (321 sq mi) and support a population of approximately 276,000.

On 14 February 2017, the NSW Government announced that there would be no amalgamation between Wollongong and Shellharbour council areas.

== Council ==
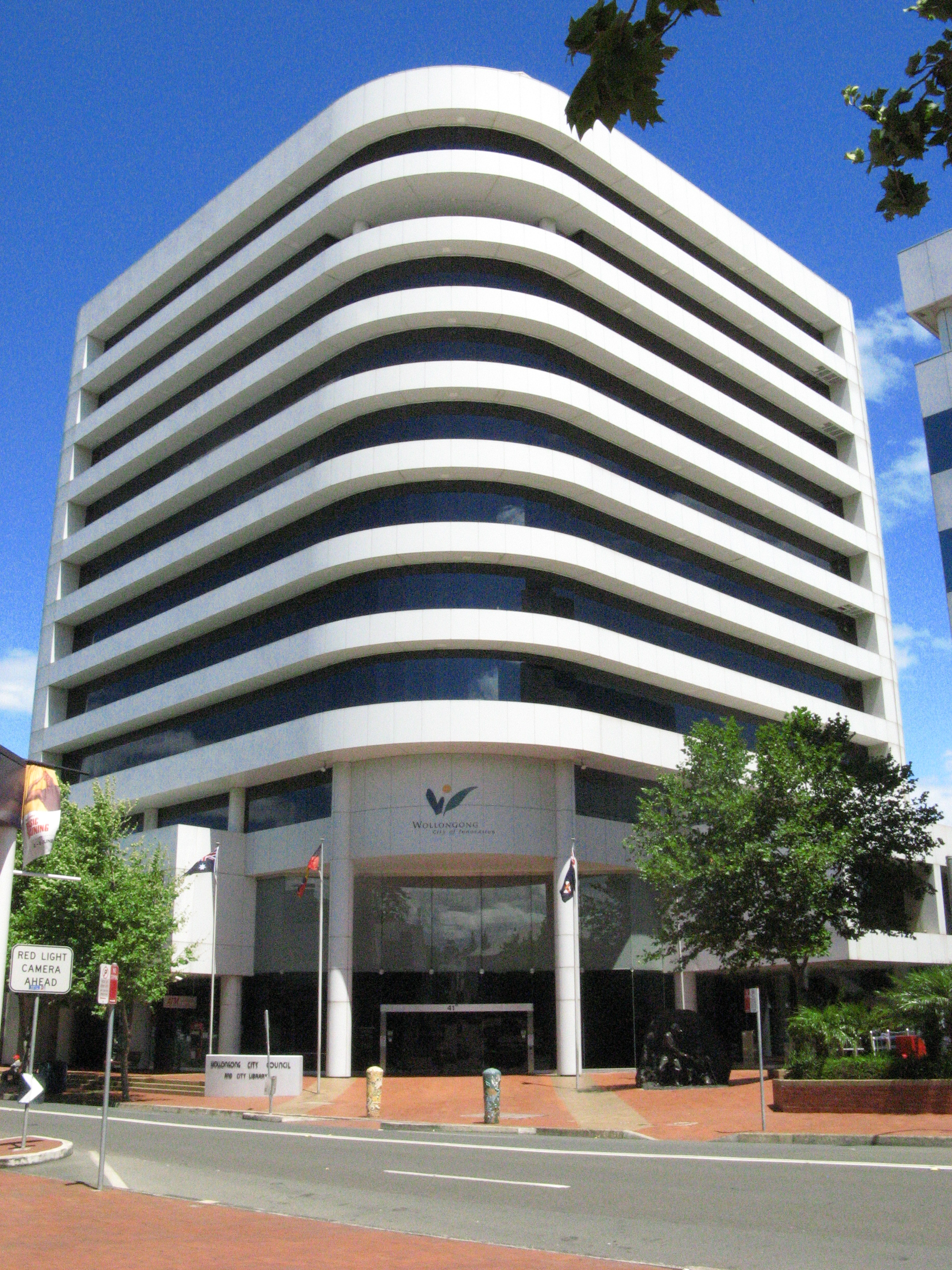
Wollongong City Council administration building, located in Burelli Street, Wollongong

=== Current composition and election method ===
Wollongong City Council is composed of thirteen councillors, including the Lord Mayor. The Lord Mayor is directly elected while the twelve other Councillors are elected proportionally as three separate wards, each electing four Councillors. Under the Local Government (Shellharbour and Wollongong Elections) Act, 2011 (NSW) Councillors were elected to hold office until September 2016, however delays due to amalgamation proposals pushed the election back until September 2017, with the council to be elected for a three-year term. The most recent election was held on 4 December 2021 and the makeup of the council, including the Lord Mayor, is as follows: In 2018, as a result of Cr Connor's resignation, there was a by-election held for residents of Ward 3. Ann Martin, Labor, who had previously held a seat on Wollongong Council, was resoundingly elected, with just under 50% of the primary vote.

Party	Councillors
Labor	8
Greens	3
Independents	2
Total	13

The current Council, elected in 2024, in order of election by ward, is:

Seat	Councillor	Party	Notes
Lord Mayor	Tania Brown	Labor	Lord Mayor 2024–present; Deputy Lord Mayor 2019–2024
Ward One	Jess Whittaker	Greens	
Ward One	Richard Martin	Labor	
Ward One	Dan Hayes	Labor	
Ward One	Ryan Morris	Independent	
Ward Two	Kit Docker	Greens	
Ward Two	David Brown	Labor	Deputy Lord Mayor 2011–2012, 2017–2019
Ward Two	Andrew Anthony	Independent	
Ward Two	Thomas Quinn	Labor	
Ward Three	Deidre Stuart	Greens	
Ward Three	Ann Martin	Labor	
Ward Three	Linda Campbell	Labor	Deputy Lord Mayor 2024–present
Ward Three	David Haden	Labor	Elected at a countback election held on 14 April 2026 following the resignation of Tiana Myers on 4 March 2026.

== Election results ==
=== 2024 ===
2024 New South Wales local elections: Wollongong
Party	Votes	%	Swing	Seats	Change
Labor	62,333	52.5	+12.3	7	▲1
Greens	37,246	31.4	+11.1	3	▲1
Independents	19,115	16.1	+6.4	2	▲1
Formal votes	118,694	88.4			
Informal votes	15,598	11.6			
Total	134,292	100.0		12	
Registered voters / turnout					

== See also ==
- Local government areas of New South Wales
