= Unanderra =

- Suburb
- Coordinates: 34°27′13″S 150°50′41″E
- Country: Australia
- State: New South Wales
- City: Wollongong
- LGA: City of Wollongong
- Location: 90 km (56 mi) S of Sydney; 6 km (3.7 mi) SW of Wollongong; 34 km (21 mi) N of Kiama

Government
  - State electorate: Wollongong
  - Federal division: Cunningham
- Elevation: 14 m (46 ft)

Population
  - Total: 5,476 (2021 census)
- Postcode: 2526
Suburbs around Unanderra
Cordeaux Heights	Figtree	Spring Hill
Farmborough Heights	Unanderra	Cringila
Kembla Grange	Berkeley	Berkeley

Unanderra (/ˈjuːnəndɛrə/ YOU-nən-derr-ə) is a suburb of Wollongong in New South Wales, Australia. It is located approximately 6 km south-west of the Wollongong CBD. It is bordered to the west by Farmborough, Cordeaux Heights and Farmborough Heights in the Mount Kembla foothills, the north by Figtree, the east by Berkeley and Flagstaff Hill, site of the Nan Tien Temple, and the south by Kembla Grange.

Unanderra is both a residential suburb, mostly to the west of the Princes Highway and industrial, to the east. Along the highway is a strip of shops, including Woolworths and several speciality stores.

Two distinctive buildings in Unanderra are the Catholic Church and the Syriac Orthodox Church. The Immaculate Conception Catholic Church was opened in 1954 and subsequently extended in 1997 and is located at 48 Princes Highway, Unanderra. Saint Thomas Syriac Orthodox Church in Central Road, Unanderra, was opened in 2007.

Unanderra has several local attractions including an old school building, several historic houses and a community centre. The community centre is housed in the former Central Illawarra Municipal Council Chambers, opened in 1901. This operated until the merging of the North Illawarra and Central Illawarra chambers to create the City of Greater Wollongong in 1947. The Unanderra Branch Library opened in 1955 within the centre and was enlarged in 1960.

The suburb lies on the Illawarra coastal plain, with its west border in the lower foothills of Mount Kembla. From the highway it is possible to see Mount Kembla and it has a distinctly different shape compared to other views of it.

== History ==
At the time of its founding it was known as Charcoal or Charcoal Creek, the name of a prominent waterway through the area. From the late 19th century Unanderra served as a gateway to the Sydney Municipal markets for produce (apples, beans, peas, milk) from the surrounding area as well as South Kembla, Cordeaux Valley and as far away as Goondarrin. On 20 August 1932, Unanderra became the junction for the scenic and heavily-graded railway to Moss Vale.

The Unanderra Hotel was built in 1956 and has since undergone a refurbishment to be one of the area's most-visited attractions.

The Cockatoo Run was launched in Unanderra on 19 August 1995 by 3801 Limited and has since operated as a heritage tourist train service.
