= Illawarra Baseball League =

- Sport: baseball
- No. of teams: Eight
- Country: Australia
- Most recent champion: Wests Illawarra Cardinals
- Website: Official website

The Illawarra Baseball League is a sports league of Wollongong, Kiama and the Shoalhaven. It conducts the sport of baseball as the region's organising body. It has eight active clubs. The I.B.A. is a member of the NSW Country Baseball Association, which falls under the banner of the New South Wales Baseball.

== Clubs ==
Team	Est.	City	Notes
Berkeley Eagles	1973	Berkeley, Wollongong	2010 First, Second and Third Grade Premiers and Minor Premiers. Club Champions 2010
Bulli Pirates	1967	Bulli, Wollongong	2009 Third & Fourth Grade Champions, Home field at Fairy Meadow
Dapto Chiefs		Dapto, Wollongong	2009 Fifth Grade Champion
Dapto Panthers		Koonawarra, Wollongong	Did not participate in 2009 Major League Season, Minor League Only
Kiama Braves		Kiama Downs, Kiama	
Shellharbour City Warriors		Lake Illawarra, Shellharbour	Did not participate in 2009 Major League Season, Minor League Only
Shoalhaven Mariners	2005	Nowra/Bomaderry, Shoalhaven	Currently playing from their newly finished home at Ison Park, South Nowra NSW 2540
Wests Illawarra Cardinals	1948	Cringila, Wollongong	2009 First Grade, Second Grade & Overall Club Champions

== See also ==
- Australian Baseball Federation
- New South Wales Major League
- New South Wales Patriots
