= Farmborough Heights =

- Suburb
- Coordinates: 34°27′20″S 150°49′10″E
- Country: Australia
- State: New South Wales
- City: Wollongong
- LGA: City of Wollongong
- Location: 92 km (57 mi) SSW of Sydney; 9 km (5.6 mi) SW of Wollongong; 34 km (21 mi) N of Kiama

Government
  - State electorate: Wollongong
  - Federal division: Cunningham
- Elevation: 125 m (410 ft)

Population
  - Total: 4,179 (2021 census)
- Postcode: 2526
Suburbs around Farmborough Heights
Kembla Heights	Mount Kembla	Cordeaux Heights
Dombarton, Kembla Grange	Farmborough Heights	Unanderra
Kembla Grange	Kembla Grange	Unanderra

Farmborough Heights is a lower southern, low, medium-high wealth suburb in the city of Wollongong, New South Wales, Australia. It is situated to the west of Unanderra in the foothills of Mount Kembla. The suburb mainly consists of separate residential dwellings, but also has a general store. It once had a take away, though the take away and many other stores were demolished in 2010 to make room for more housing.

Farmborough Heights is situated on two ridges, both are the lesser slopes of Mount Kembla. The main access road to the suburb is Farmborough Road. However, Waples Road and Panorama Drive also provide major access to the suburb.

According to the 2021 census there are 4,179 people residing in Farmborough Heights, with 2,031 (48.7%) being males, and 2,142 (51.3%) being females.

Subdivisions in the last 10–15 years have seen the establishment of more substantial residences. Many of the homes in Farmborough Heights enjoy the elevated location and views of both the sea and mountains.

Farmborough Road Public School is the local government primary school located in the adjoining suburb of Unanderra, and is also home to the Families at Farmborough Community Centre catering for children of preschool age. Illawarra Sports High in Berkeley is the local government high school. Figtree High School is the next closest High School located just 4 kilometres away. Church based school options include Cedars and St Pius primary schools; and St Mary's Star of the Sea, Edmund Rice, Illawarra Christian School, Holy Spirit or Corpus Christi high schools.

Farmborough was originally 3 separate farms. These farmhouses are still standing today. One is on Silvertop, one is on Farmborough Road (approx. 300 metres from the general store) and one is located just to the east of Coachwood Drive. These were the three original houses of Farmborough. Today, 2000+ houses are on land once owned by three different farmers.
