= Nan Tien Temple =

Buddhist temple in Australia

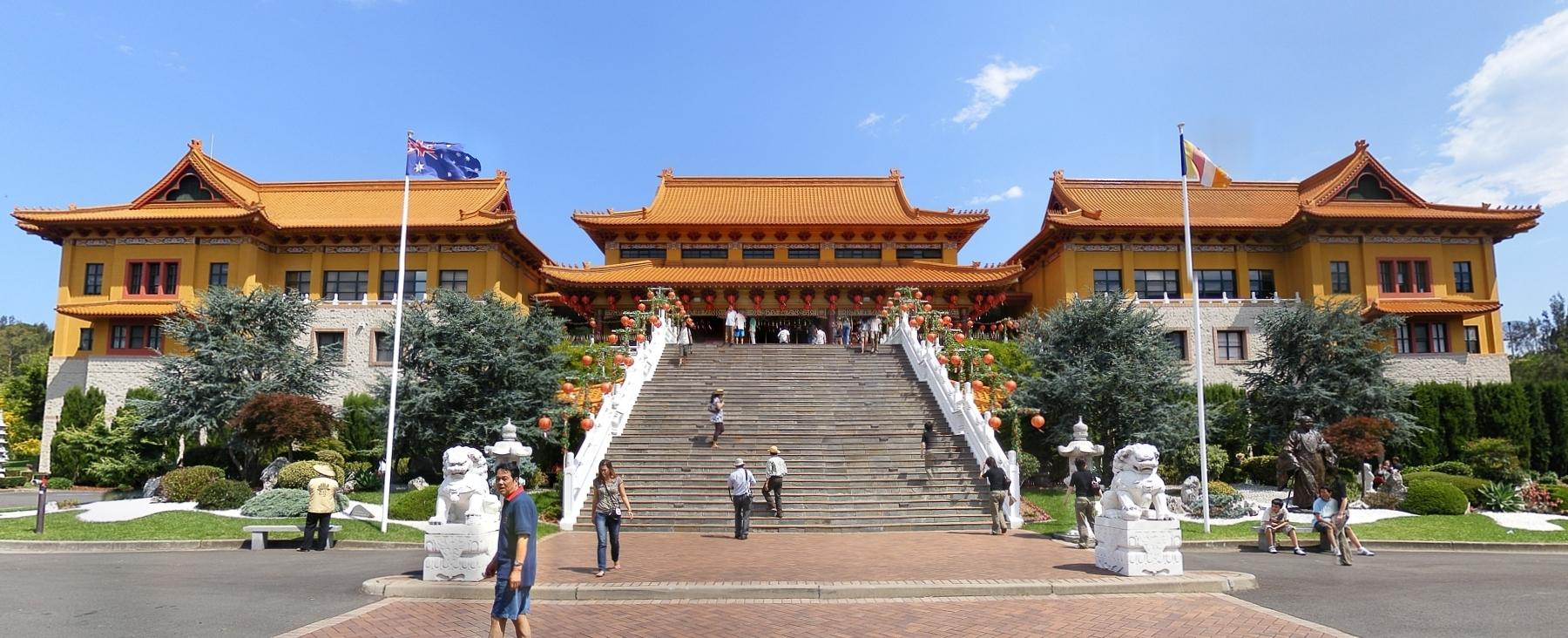
- The main entrance to the Nan Tien Temple complex, with the Great Mercy Shrine at centre.

- Location within New South Wales Location within Australia

Religion
- Affiliation: Buddhist
- Sect: Fo Guang Shan
- Status: Active

Location
- Location: Berkeley, New South Wales
- Country: Australia
- Coordinates: 34°28′00″S 150°50′55″E

Architecture
- Architect: Brewster Hjorth
- Founder: Hsing Yun
- Groundbreaking: 1992
- Completed: 1995

Website
- https://www.nantien.org.au/en/

Fo Guang Shan Nan Tien Temple (Chinese: 佛光山南天寺; pinyin: Fóguāngshān Nántiān Sì; lit. 'Southern Heaven Temple') is a Buddhist temple complex located in Berkeley, on the southern outskirts of the Australian city of Wollongong, approximately 90 kilometres (56 mi) south of Sydney.

Nan Tien is one of the branch temples of the Taiwanese Fo Guang Shan Buddhist order, founded in 1967 by Hsing Yun, which has over 120 branches worldwide. The temple is one of the largest Buddhist temples in the southern hemisphere.

== History ==
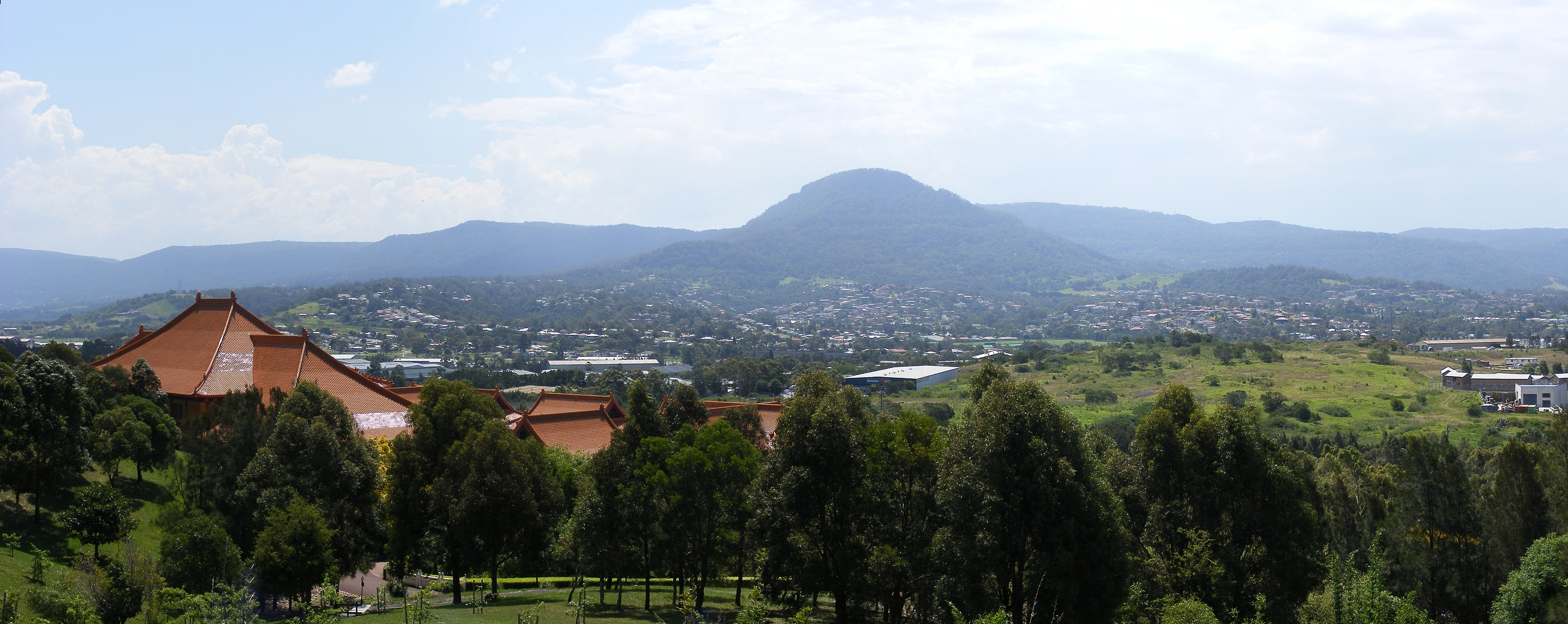
Looking over the temple out towards Mount Kembla and the Illawarra Escarpment

It was founded by and constructed under the auspices of the Mahayana Buddhist organisation known as Fo Guang Shan, and completed in 1995. The organisation itself was founded in Taiwan in 1967 by Venerable Master Hsing Yun, and has 120 branches throughout the world. Fo Guang Shan Buddhism is rooted in the Mahayana tradition which emphasises that Buddhahood is within everyone's potential reach. Fo Guang Shan followers strive to bring Buddhism into daily life and describe their philosophy as "Humanistic Buddhism".

The site of the Australian branch's temple was reputedly chosen by Hsing Yun due to its proximity to Mount Kembla, which is said to have an auspicious resemblance to a recumbent lion. It overlooks both Mount Keira and Mount Kembla. The land which the temple stands on was donated by Frank Arkell. The hill behind the temple is on a 100 year lease from the local government so as to preserve the serenity of the temple's surroundings. The temple pays a rent of one dollar a year to maintain the lease.

== Temple complex ==
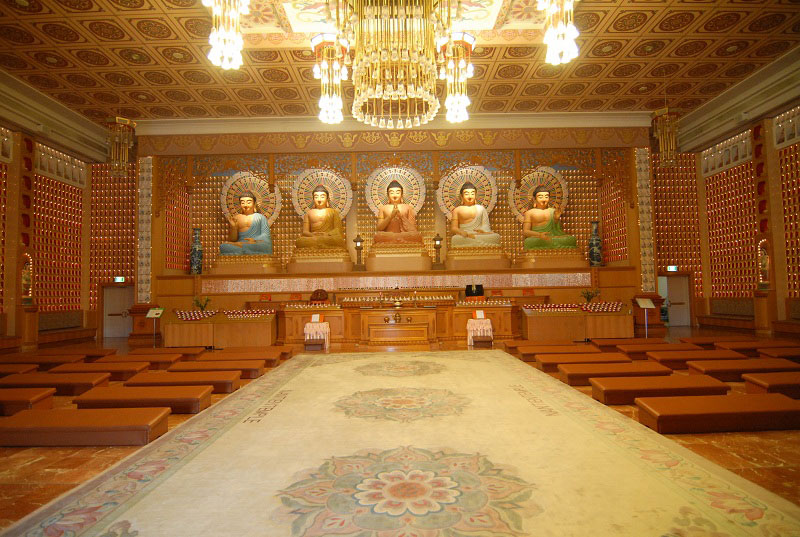
Shrine to the Five Tathagathas in the temple

The Nan Tien complex is a Chinese-styled palace structure built using modern architectural techniques. Designed by Australian architects, Jones Brewster Regan and built by Australian construction workers, it occupies a semi-rural hillside site several square kilometres in size, and is set amidst landscaped gardens.

In addition to various meeting rooms, a museum, cultural, conference and accommodation facilities and a restaurant, the Nan Tien temple complex includes two massive prayer halls (known as the Great Mercy Shrine and the Great Hero Hall) within which are located multiple monumental Buddha and Bodhisattva statues, as well as an eight-level pagoda, serving as a columbarium intended to house the cremated remains of 7000 people. The front hall houses the Thousand Handed Avalokitesvara (known as Kuan Yin in Chinese culture) and the main hall in the back houses the Five Dhyani Buddhas, Amogasiddhi, Ratnasambhava, Vairocana, Amitabha and Akshobhya. Both halls have thousands of tiny statues of Buddha on the walls. The complex also has amenities for monks, nuns and visitors, and a large garden with a pagoda.

The architecture of the complex is notable because it incorporates the features of several styles of Buddhism. The pagoda is distinctly Chinese, with flying eaves and an angular profile. The main temples incorporates features of Tibetan monastic architecture, with multi-storey painted temple buildings set atop high stone platforms (see the Potala Palace). The courtyards feature Japanese-style gardens, while the statues and shrines often incorporate bright, South-East Asian colour schemes, in contrast to the more austere styles favoured in China.

== Tourism ==
The temple is one of Wollongong's major tourist attractions and conducts regular weekend retreats for visitors interested in Buddhism in general and Chinese culture in particular. Retreats can involve classes in tai chi, calligraphy and meditation.

Accommodation for retreat participants and members of the general public is available at the Pilgrim Lodge, a 100-room motel-style facility located in the temple grounds adjacent to its large lotus pond.

It is regarded as an "orthodox" Buddhist temple by local Chinese Buddhists, in contrast with some other shrines which worship Buddhist, Taoist, and mystical heroes in the same building. It frequently hosts festivals.

== University ==
Nan Tien Institute of Higher Education
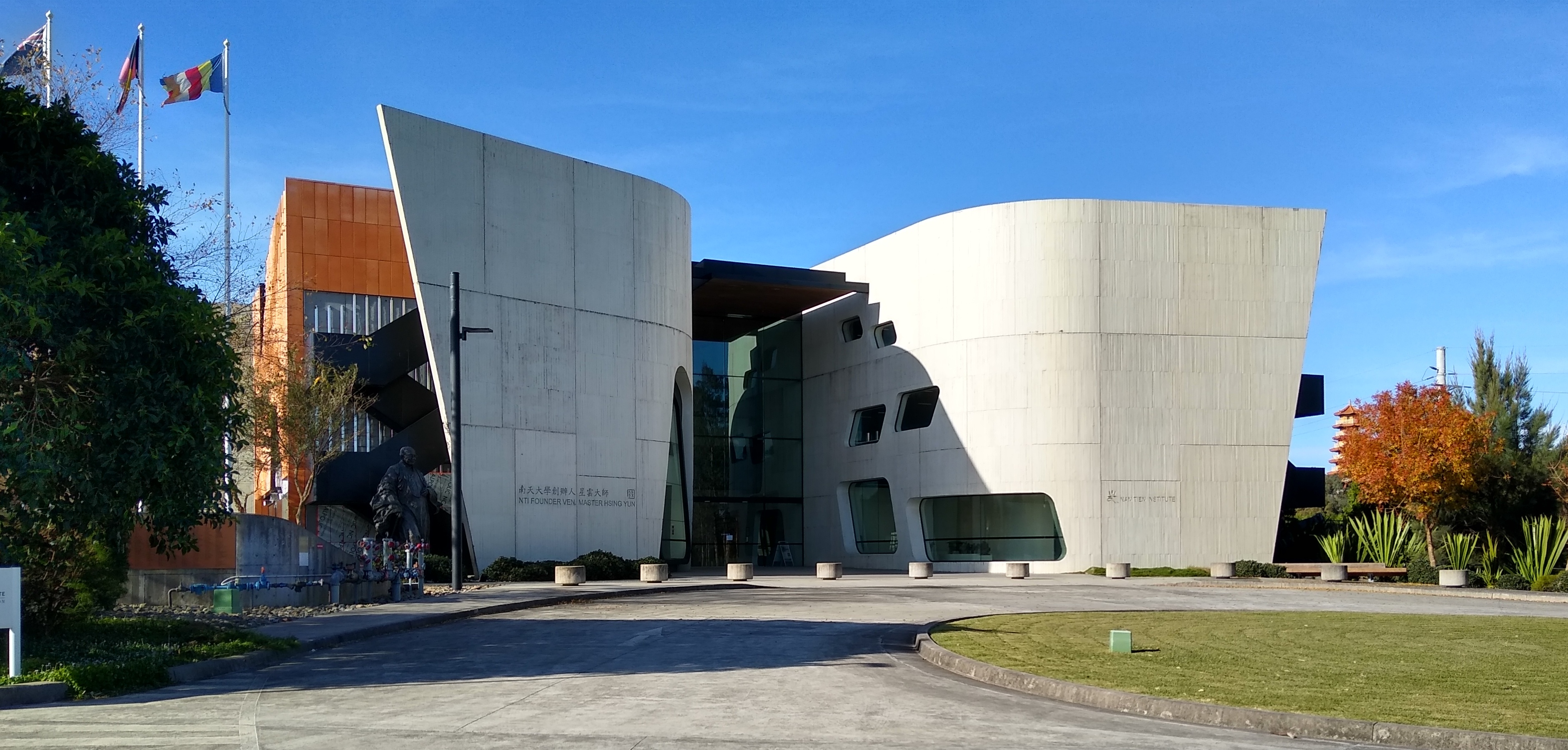
- Type: Private
- Established: 2011
- Religious affiliation: Humanistic Buddhism
- President: Professor Alistair Noble
- Location: Wollongong, NSW, Australia
- Website: www.nantien.edu.au//

Nan Tien Institute (NTI) is a private, not for profit, government accredited higher education provider offering studies in the areas of Buddhist studies, health and wellbeing, within an environment that incorporates contemplative education. NTI offers postgraduate programs in Applied Buddhist Studies, Applied Mindfulness, Health and Social Wellbeing, Humanistic Buddhism and Mental Health, as well as customised Continuing Professional Development (CPD) programs and special interest subjects across the areas of meditation, mindfulness and health. It opened in 2015 and is located opposite the Nan Tien Temple across the Princes Motorway. A pedestrian bridge joining the university and the temple was completed in 2018.

== Gallery ==
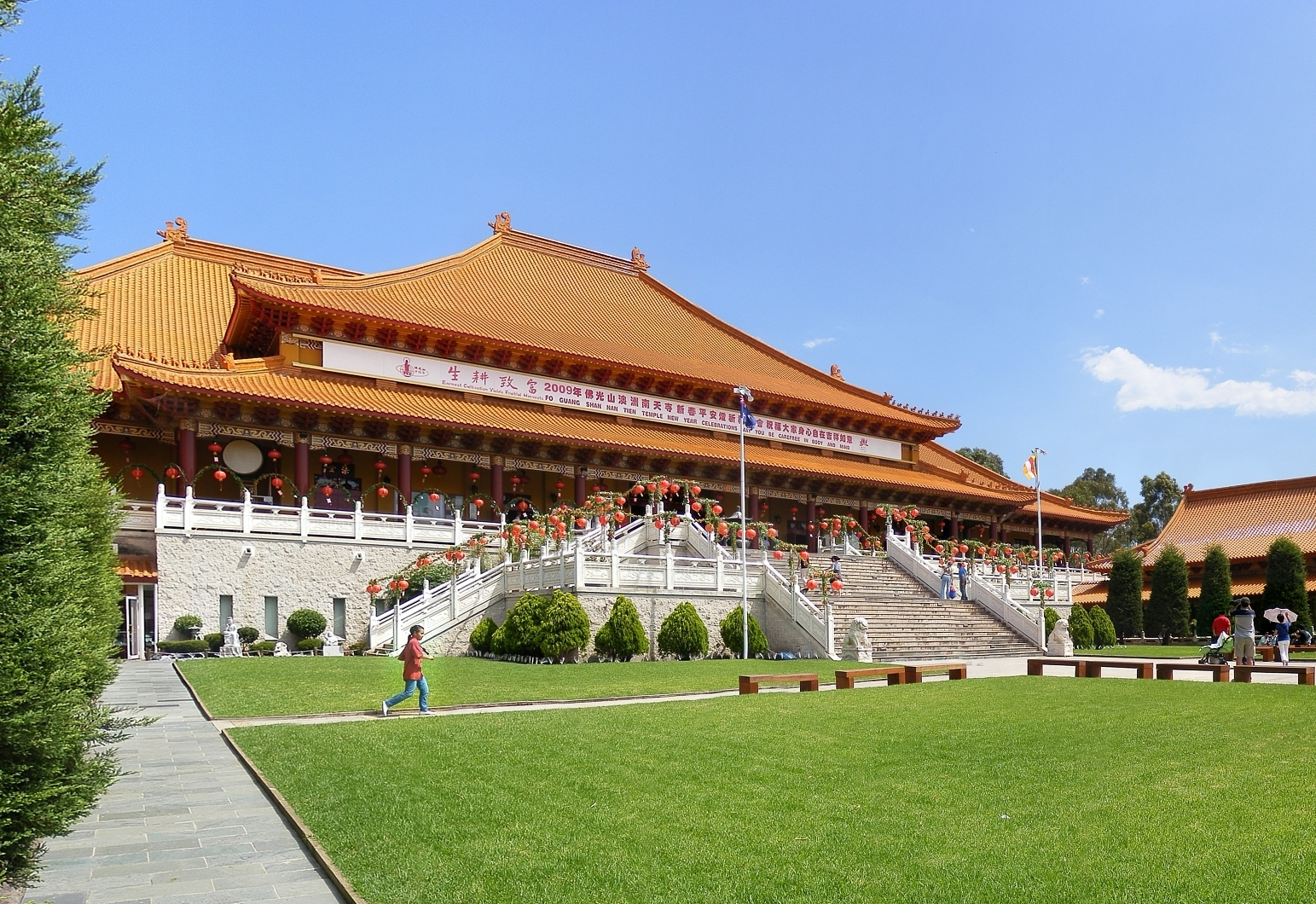
The main temple

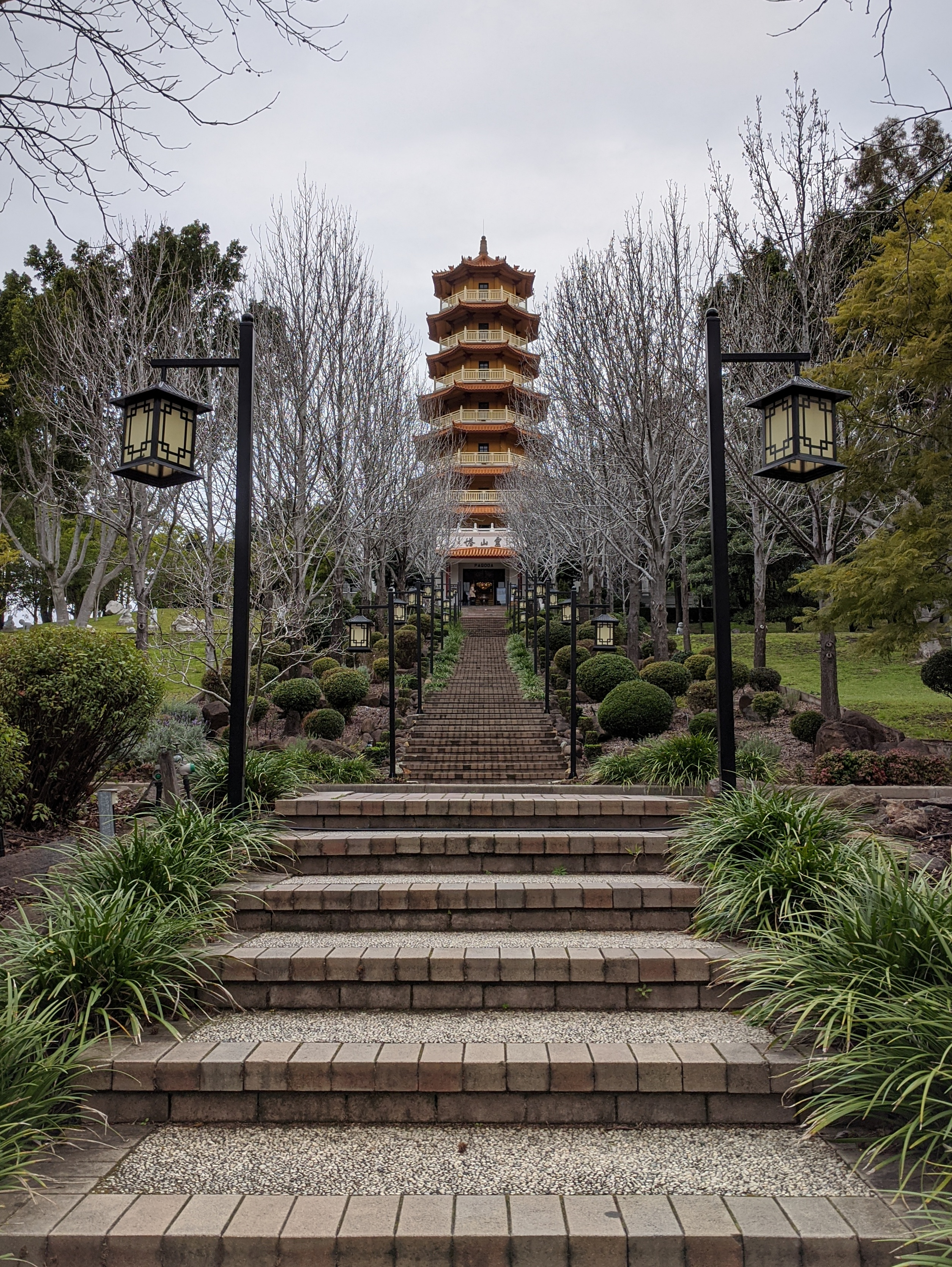
Steps to the 8 Level Pagoda that is located within the Nan Tien complex

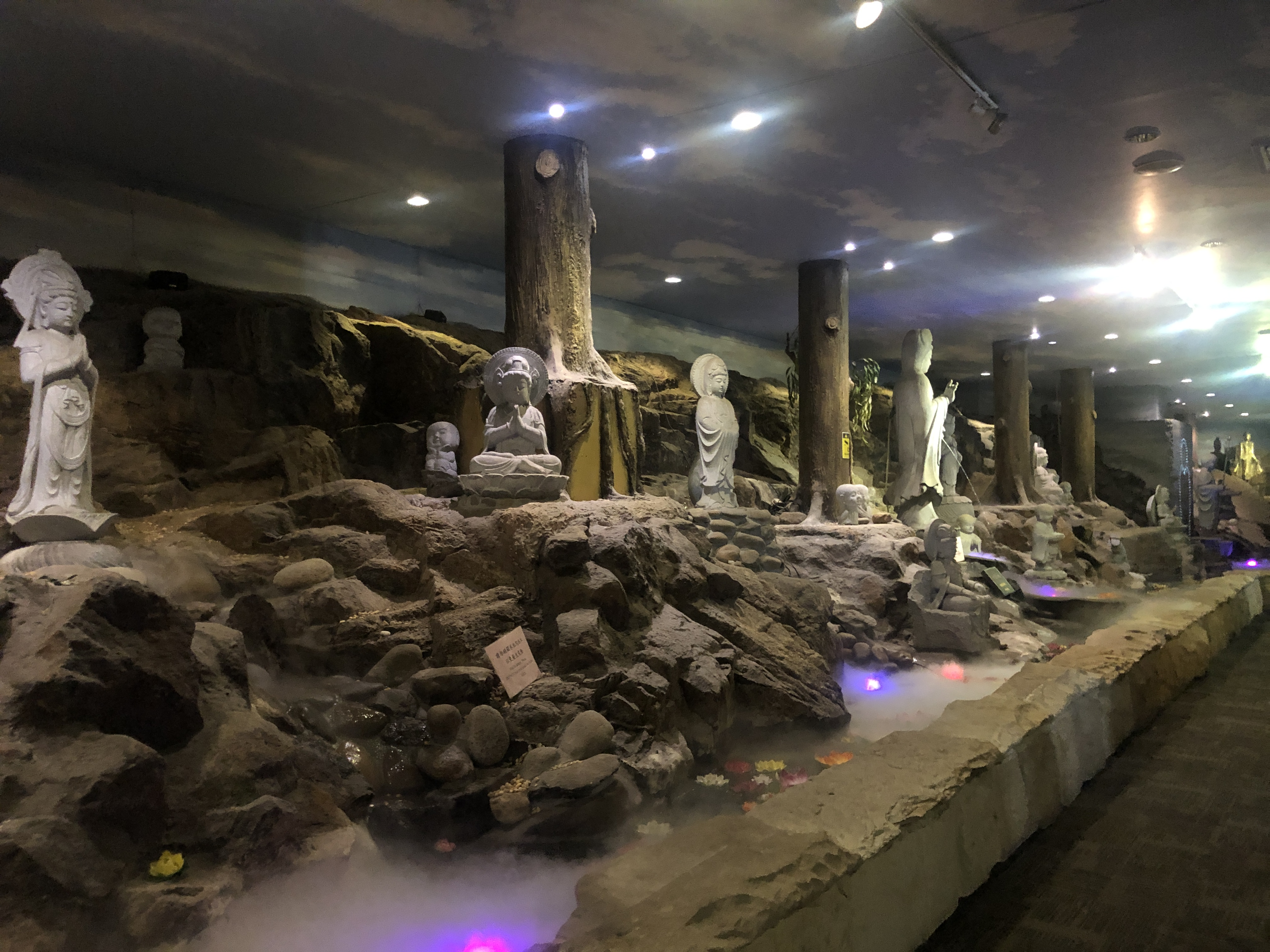
Water feature in the temple, featuring statues of various bodhisattvas

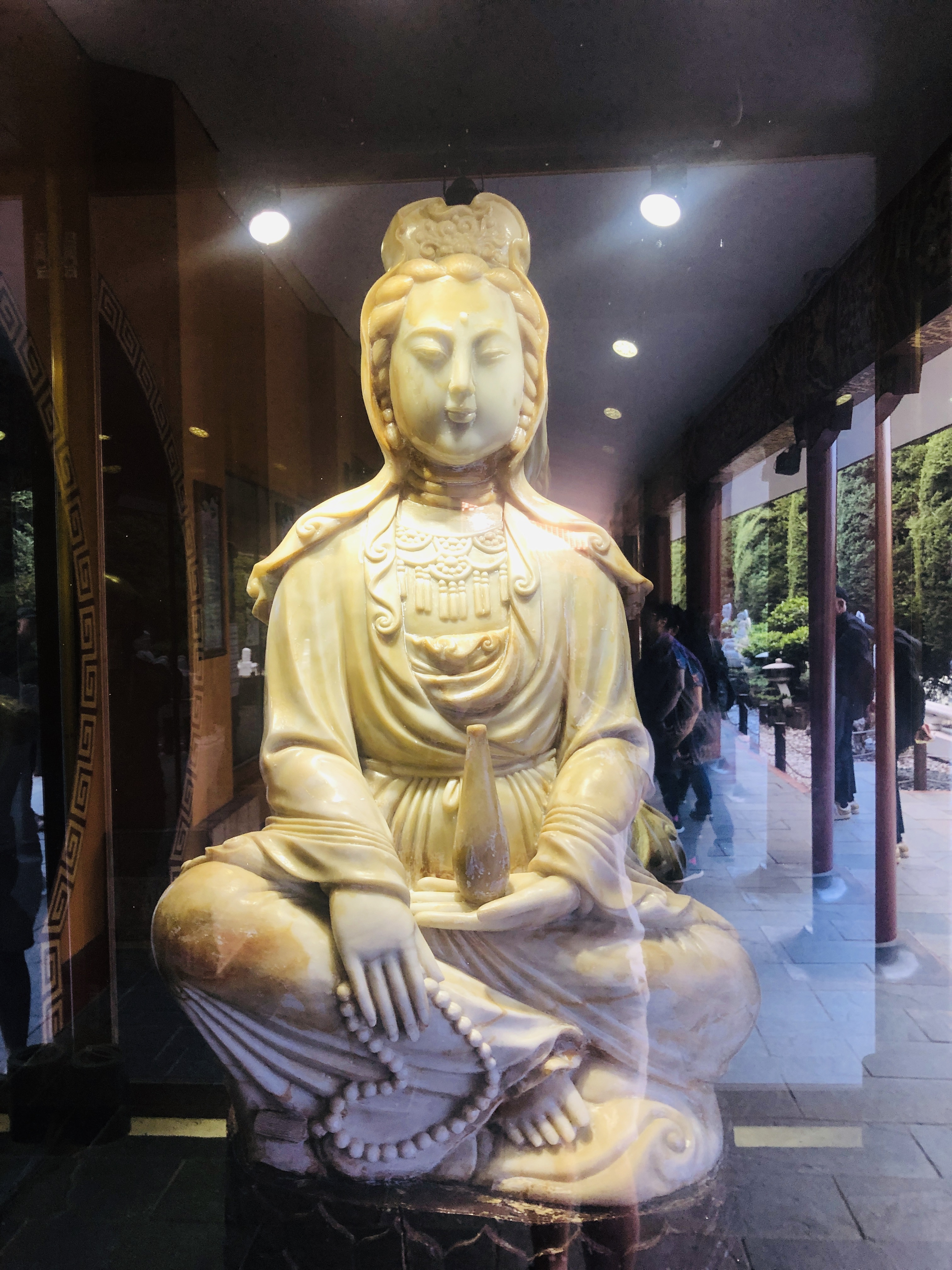
Shrine to Guanyin in the temple

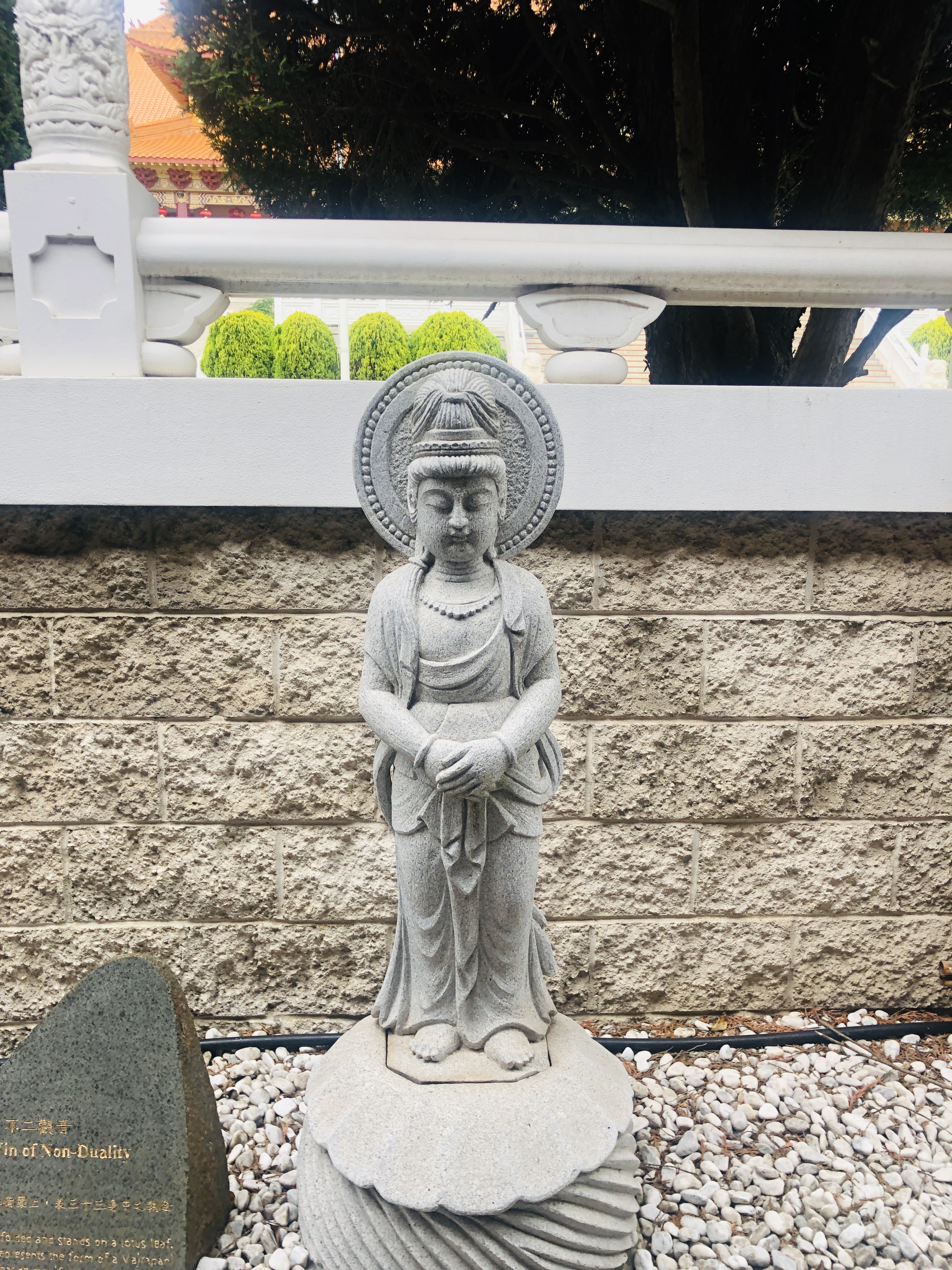
Statuette of a bodhisattva in the temple

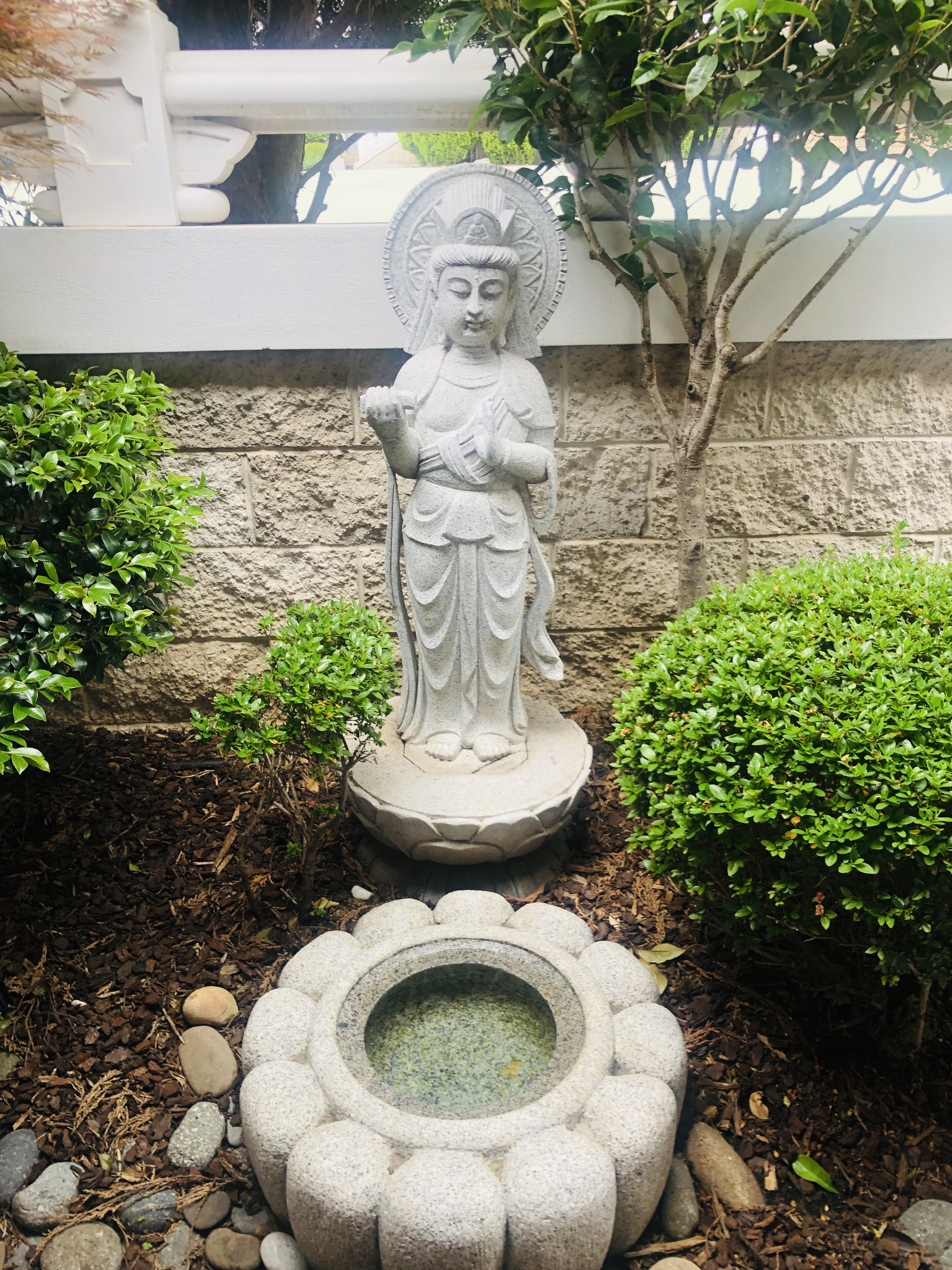
Statuette of a bodhisattva in the temple

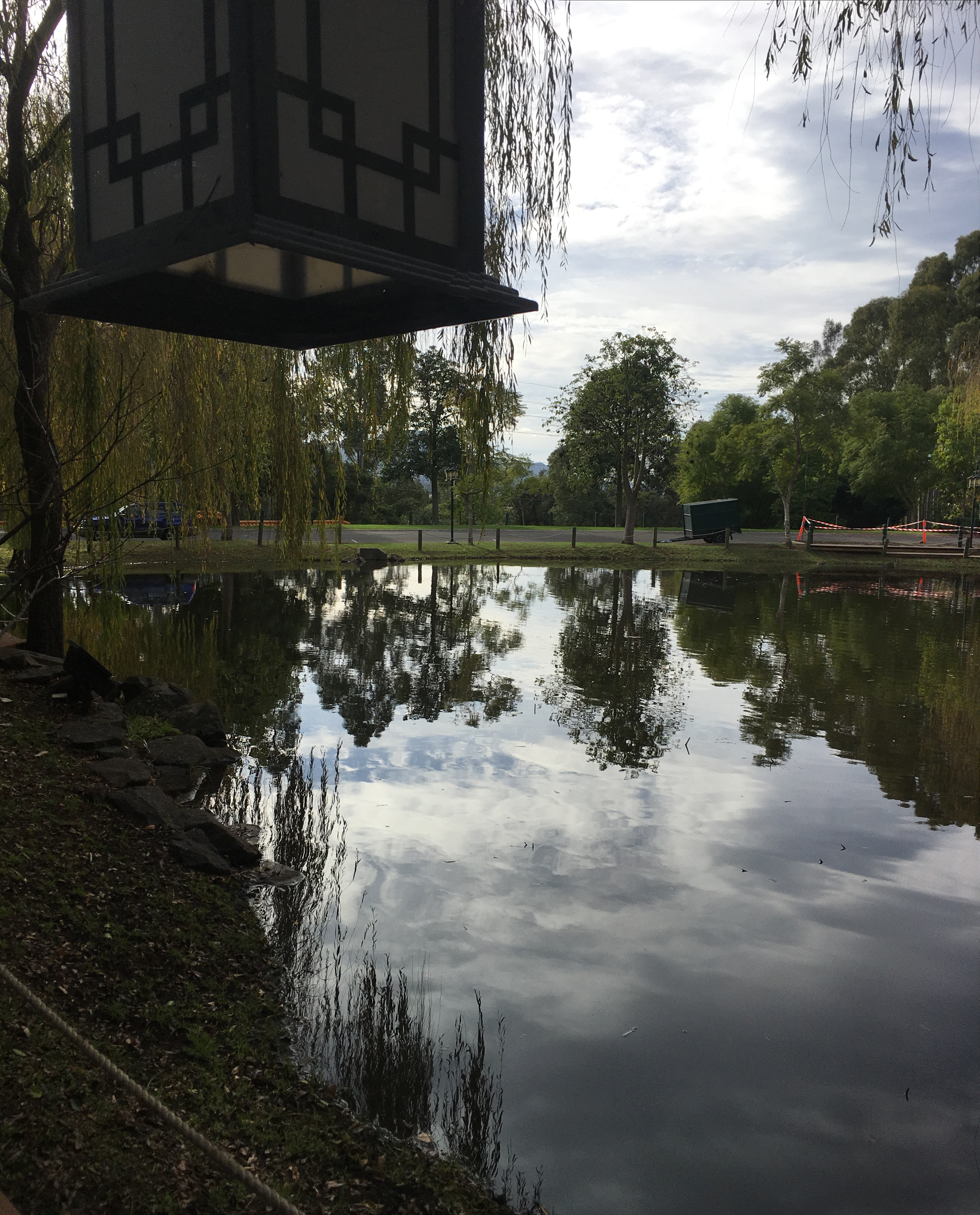
Free Life Pond in the temple

== See also ==
- Hsing Yun
- Chung Tian Temple
- Hsi Lai Temple
- Nan Hua Temple
- Great Stupa of Universal Compassion
- Jade Buddha for Universal Peace
