= Kembla Heights =

Suburb of Wollongong, Australia

- Suburb
- Coordinates: 34°25′50″S 150°48′25″E
- Country: Australia
- State: New South Wales
- City: Wollongong
- LGA: City of Wollongong

Government
  - State electorate: Keira
  - Federal division: Cunningham

Population
  - Total: 88 (2021 census)
- Postcode: 2526
Suburbs around Kembla Heights
		Mount Keira
	Kembla Heights	Mount Kembla
Dombarton	Kembla Grange	Farmborough Heights

Kembla Heights is a village west of Wollongong, New South Wales in the Parish of Kembla County of Camden. It is situated along Harry Graham Drive and upper Cordeaux Road and is part of a tourist route that runs along the Illawarra escarpment for a distance between Mount Kembla and Mount Keira. The Dendrobium Colliery (Illawarra Coal, South32) is located in Kembla Heights.

The entire village of Kembla Heights is a heritage conservation area under the Wollongong City Council Development Control Plan "Kembla Heights is the most intact mining village in the Wollongong Local Government Area with its simple, consistent late Victorian and early Federation period cottages". It is in fact the last remaining coal mining village that is company owned in the Illawarra today. The southern portion of Cordeaux Road, Kembla Heights, is known as Windy Gully, it is partially company owned and in private ownership and also part of the Kembla Heights Heritage Conservation Area. The historic Windy Gully Cemetery is located in this portion of Kembla Heights and is still company owned.

== History ==
Kembla Heights is within Dharawal country linking Mount Kemba (the men's mountain) to Mount Keira (the women's mountain) and west to the Cordeaux River Valley that formed a travelling route for Aboriginal people connecting the coast areas to the inland Bargo area.

Timber getters were in the area from the 1810s in search of valuable red cedar (Toona ciliata). Europeans began occupying the landscape for agriculture from the 1850s forming a rural collection of farms associated with the settlement known as American Creek.

=== Mining ===
With the discovery of oil baring shale and coal the land around Kembla Heights was purchased to become a mining settlement. The Pioneer Kerosene Works (1860–1878) Australia's first shale mining and kerosene manufacturing plant was owned by John Graham and situated at Kembla Heights. This plant was purchased by the Mount Kembla Coal and Oil Company (1878–1913) who developed a new coal mine to the north of Kerosene site, later renamed Mount Kembla Colliery Limited (1913–1946) and finally purchased by Australian Iron and Steel, AIS (1946–1970). Nebo Colliery (1946–1993) was developed by AIS on the site of the original Kerosene works at Kembla Heights.

=== Mount Kembla Mine Disaster ===
Mount Kembla Coal and Oil Company's mine in Kembla Heights was the site of the worst industrial accident in Australia's history, the Mount Kembla Mine Disaster, with the death of 96 persons. The disaster took place on Thursday 31 July 1902, at precisely three minutes past two o'clock in the afternoon. The disaster was caused by gas seeping undetected from the coal seam in a disused area of the mine that had been mined out. A rock fall pushed the gas out into the tunnels where men were working. When the gas reached the naked flame of colliery workers light, it ignited instantly and caused a series of further gas and coal dust explosions. The initial blast killed some instantly, but the majority died from carbon monoxide poisoning which penetrated the tunnels from the incomplete combustion of fuel.

Windy Gully cemetery was created on a 0.5 acres (0.2 ha) of company land to receive the bodies of the victims of the disaster of 1902. In all, about a third of the victims were buried at Windy Gully, most either Presbyterian or Methodist. It was originally known as the Kembla Heights Cemetery or Presbyterian Cemetery.
