= Berkeley Eagles (baseball) =

Australian baseball club

Berkeley Eagles Baseball Club

Information
- League: Illawarra Baseball League (Major League: First Grade, Second Grade and Third Grade)
- Location: Berkeley, New South Wales, Australia
- Ballpark: Fred Finch Park, Berkeley, New South Wales
- Founded: 1973
- Nickname(s): The Eagles
- League championships: 1976, 1986, 1988, 1989, 1991, 1994, 1998, 2000, 2002, 2003, 2004, 2007, 2010
- Colors: Dark Green, Black, White, Yellow

The Berkeley Eagles Baseball Club, also known as the Berkeley Eagles, is a baseball club based in Berkeley, New South Wales. The Berkeley Eagles are one of the eight major clubs in the Illawarra Baseball Association, and a part of the NSW Country Baseball Association, falling under the banner of New South Wales Baseball. The club was first initiated into the Illawarra Baseball League in 1973. Since introduction, the Berkeley Eagles club have been a notable competitor in the Illawarra Senior Baseball League with 12 First Grade Premierships, ranging from 1976 to the most current 2010.

The Eagles current home ground is Fred Finch Park in Berkeley and has been the home ground since 1982. Fred Finch is a highly renowned ground with the most impressive infield in the Illawarra, due to many face-lifts over its tenure. With its notoriety, the Fred Finch Complex was expanded to two major fields for the Claxton Shield 2008 clash between Perth Heath and New South Wales Patriots.

The club has produced a high stock of representative juniors throughout its history with many juniors representing Australia and the Australia Provincial teams. The most notable representatives that the Eagles have produced include; Aaron Tritton, Nathan March, Stuart Thompson, Andrew Coad, Patrick Booth, James Toomey, Jamie Peel and Dennis Grubb.

The most recent Australian representative, Aaron Tritton represented Australia at the Cal Ripken World Series in 2004 played in Aberdeen, Maryland in the United States of America. Aaron also represented NSW Country and Illawarra on numerous occasions throughout his junior years, and is currently a member of the 1st Grade 2010 Premiers defending their title in the 2011 Illawarra Senior Baseball Major League Final Series. Nathan March toured Europe in 1999 representing the Australian Provincial Team, playing in Prague and Munich. He was a member of the 2nd Grade 2010 Minor Premiers and Premiership winning team, catching the winning catch against the Dapto Chiefs. Fellow previous juniors Mick Shipp and Shannon Crilly also were members of the Illawarra Flame Squad that toured in Seattle in 2005, in the Trans-Pacific Challenge. Not only did the Berkeley Eagles produce Australian representatives, a member of the 2010 Premiership winning first grade squad, Tim Atherton was selected as a train on member of the Major League Baseball Minnesota Twins feeder club, the Elizabethton Twins, in 2011.

The Berkeley Eagles have a renowned historical rivalry between two major clubs; the Dapto Chiefs and Western Suburbs Cardinals. This spite and "hatred" between Berkeley and Dapto came to fruition in the infamous 2009 final series bench-clearing brawl between the first grade squads. A congregation of flying fists and bone crunching tackles were evident in the day leading to an all in brawl. An incident occurred at home plate, with catcher Mick Shipp being ejected from the game.
