= Lake Heights =

- Suburb
- Coordinates: 34°29′07″S 150°51′58″E
- Country: Australia
- State: New South Wales
- City: Wollongong
- LGA: City of Wollongong

Government
  - State electorate: Wollongong
  - Federal division: Cunningham

Population
  - Total: 4,105 (2021 census)
- Postcode: 2502
Suburbs around Lake Heights
Cringila	Cringila	Port Kembla
Berkeley	Lake Heights	Warrawong
	Lake Illawarra

Lake Heights is a coastal suburb east of Berkeley and south of Cringila in the City of Wollongong. At the 2021 census, it had a population of 4,105.

The suburb gets its name from being above Lake Illawarra and most streets in the suburb enjoy views of the lake and escarpment.

== Sport ==
The suburb's local Football (Soccer) club is Lake Heights Lions who are yet to have an official playing ground but train at Barina oval and occasionally play at John Crehan Park in Cringila.
