= Shoalhaven Mariners =

Shoalhaven Mariners Baseball Association
- [[File: |frameless|class=pageimage|alt=]] Logo

Information
- League: Illawarra Baseball League (Major League First Grade, Second Grade & Third Grade)
- Location: Nowra/Bomaderry, New South Wales, Australia
- Ballpark: South Nowra Soccer Complex
- Founded: 2005 (First IBL season 2006)
- League championships: None
- Colors: Navy Blue, Green, White, Grey

Current uniforms
Current	Alternative

The Shoalhaven Mariners Baseball Association, also known as the Shoalhaven Mariners, is a baseball club based in the northern Shoalhaven and is one of the youngest clubs in Australian baseball. They are the youngest club participating in the Illawarra Baseball League.

In previous seasons, the Mariners have fielded only two teams in the three team major league. This allowed the club to develop quickly and in the 2014 season, the Mariners fielded three teams in the Illawarra Senior Baseball League.

The Mariners originally played out of Fred Finch Park in Berkeley, Wollongong. However, on 24 July 2014, the Mariners started playing at the South Nowra Soccer Complex, which is an exclusive baseball facility.

The Mariners are also developing their Junior Sides, with the new Junior Season starting with Come and Try Days in September 2016 for children ages between 4 and 15, with Come and Try Junior Baseball and T-Ball sessions being held in Nowra, Sanctuary Point and Ulladulla. For a number of years the Mariners Juniors have trained and played on Friday evenings with the season running from October to March.

The Mariners also fielded their first ever Junior side in the Illawarra Junior Baseball League in 2013/14, with their U12's Little League finishing a respectable 3rd in their debut season.
