= Wendy Richardson =

Australian playwright (born 1933)

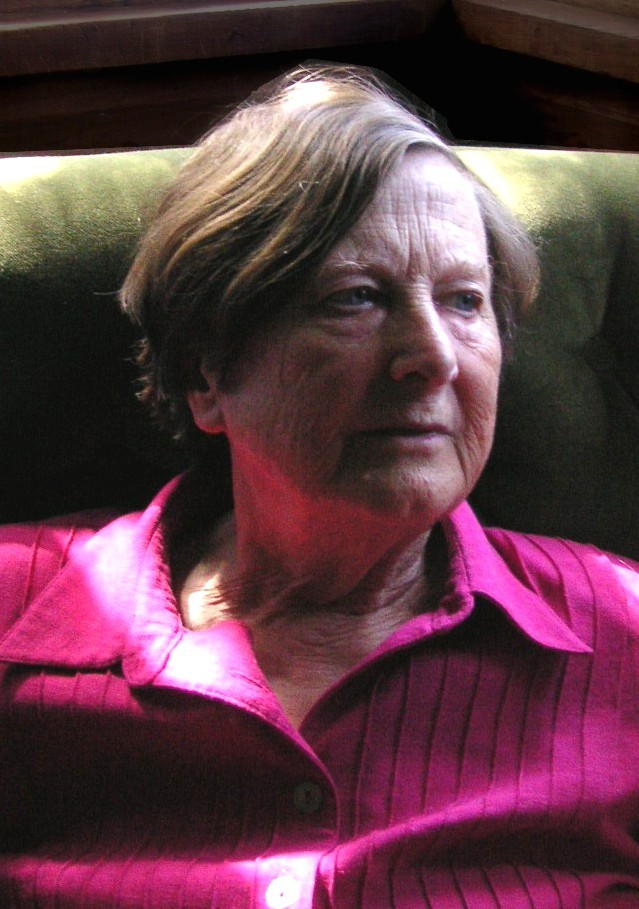
- Richardson in 2005
- Born: 1933 (age 92–93); Singleton, New South Wales, Australia
- Education: University of Wollongong
- Writing career
- Notable work: Windy Gully

Wendy Richardson, OAM (born 1933) is one of Australia's most popular playwrights, best known as the author of Windy Gully. Richardson lives in Mount Kembla near Wollongong, New South Wales. She is very active in the local community, working with disabled and disadvantaged youth, assisting those in need, teaching Sunday School and participating in historical and literary events.

Richardson describes herself:

"I'm a teller of tales. I weave them out of what I hear and observe – some of them are true. I write about ordinary people who never consider themselves courageous or outstanding and who have led such extraordinary lives."

== Biography ==
Richardson was born in Singleton in the Hunter Valley, New South Wales, on 21 December 1933. In 1967 she moved to the small mining village of Mount Kembla in the Illawarra District, where she raised her children, working as a primary school teacher. In 1985 she commenced studying English Literature at the University of Wollongong, where she was to gain a Bachelor of Arts Degree.

Richardson describes her association with Mount Kembla:

"I came to Mount Kembla by accident, we got lost on the mountain. It was real Bunyip country. We bought a large dilapidated weather board general store and dance hall. There was also a house and in a drawer of an old desk was a copy of the Royal Commission into the Mine Disaster of 1902. I opened the dusty cover. It pulled me into the story, and this was my departure point.... As I read and talked and walked and listened I began to realize what a privilege it was to live in a close-knit mining community where we keep alive those things we must never forget."

=== Windy Gully ===
It was while studying at Wollongong University that Richardson wrote her first play, Windy Gully, which was commissioned and performed by the Theatre South Regional Theatre Company, directed by Des Davis, in 1987. The subject of Windy Gully is the mine disaster which took place at Mount Kembla on 31 July 1902, in which 96 men and boys lost their lives. Every family who lived in the village lost a relative. In many families, fathers and sons died. The bodies were buried in Wollongong Cemetery, Mount Kembla Cemetery and in an unmarked communal grave near a cricket field in Windy Gully. In describing how she came to write the play, Richardson said:

"I was beginning to understand what the coal cost in terms of human life and I knew that those outside the mining community needed to be reminded."

Windy Gully proved very popular, going on interstate tour of mining towns in Queensland and New South Wales and being performed at the New Theatre, Sydney in 1989. There was a third season at Theatre South in 2000. Windy Gully was published in 1989 by Currency Press. Des Davis writes of Windy Gully:

The huge and many faceted event that was the Mount Kembla mine disaster is distilled to two hours on the stage and the human dimension of it is made accessible to an audience."

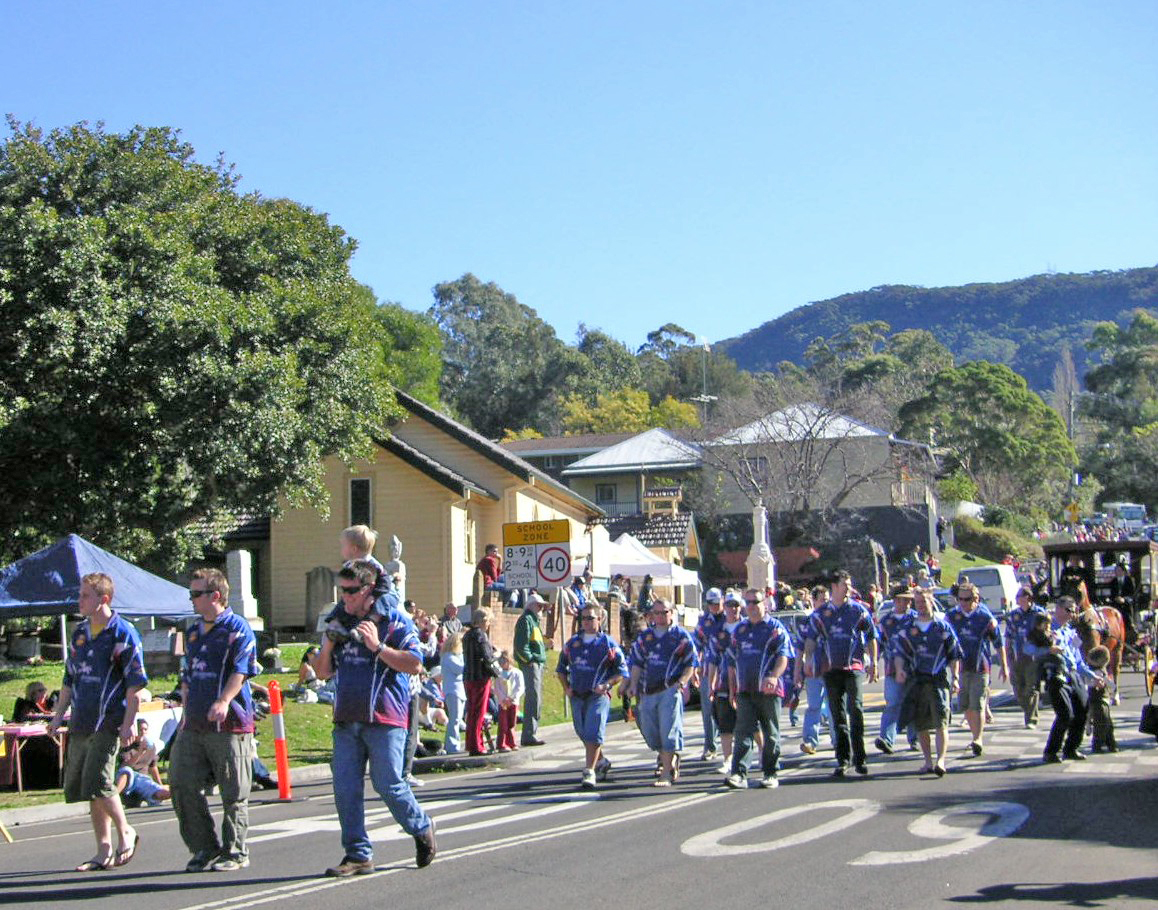
Miners marching past the memorial to the Mount Kembla mine disaster, July 2006

The anniversary of the disaster is commemorated annually with a church service at the Mount Kembla Soldiers and Miners Memorial Church, a parade and Mining Festival. Richardson was later to serve on the committee to organise the Mount Kembla Mining Disaster Centenary Commemoration in 2002. Songs from Windy Gully are published at the Mount Kembla Mining Heritage website and Illawarra Unity the journal of the Illawarra Branch of the Australian Society for the Study of Labour History.

Windy Gully was followed by Slacky Flat written in 1988, which toured the South Eastern Region of New South Wales and was performed at Theatre South and at the Regional Theatre Festival in Penrith.

=== Success ===
Richardson went on to write many more plays and monologues, all performed but many not published. Des Davis writes in the foreword to Three Illawarra Plays:

"The reason for the remarkable popularity of her work, I believe, is her use of familiar occasions, minor crises and rituals of ordinary lives set against a background of community and national crises, even disaster. The plays celebrate the resilience, the humour in adversity and quiet courage of her 'ordinary people', especially her strong female characters."

The backgrounds include World War II, in the case of Lights out, Nellie Martin and the Depression in Slacky Flat. The Last Voyage of the Gracie Anne looks at community issues within the local fishing industry. ... That Christmas of '75. is a backyard farce set against the sacking of Prime Minister Gough Whitlam by the Governor-General. John Senczuk writes of "...the overwhelming positive reception of the plays ...as positive and 'life-affirming'".

Richardson's skills as a dramatist have been greatly appreciated by Theatre South, not only because of their "box office magic", but also because Wendy knows how to write for a small group of players and is particularly skilled at monologue. Des Davis writes of Richardson's plays "They are, moreover, constantly innovative in structure, style, and in the use of other theatrical and literary devices." Unfortunately Theatre South, for whom so many of Wendy's plays were written closed in 2003.

Des Davis writes "She is more popular in the Illawarra than David Williamson and Shakespeare."

Richardson says:

"I am an ordinary person who writes about ordinary people. Being a writer is not a real blessing.....There have to be those people in our life that take the risk to tell the stories."

"Place is very important if you're going to write about it or create something; it's vital that you should walk and get to know it well."

=== Awards ===
Richardson was nominated for a Sydney Theatre Critics Circle Award in 1989 and was awarded an Australian Arts Council Literary Fellowship in 1990. In 2005 Richardson was awarded the Order of Australia Medal for her services to the Arts and to the Community, and in 2006 she was honoured in the Illawarra Australia Day Awards for her contribution to the Arts. Her plays have also been produced by the Riverina Theatre Company and heard on ABC Radio. She was made a lifetime member of Theatre South and the South Coast Writers' Centre.

== Performed works ==
For Theatre South-

- Windy Gully (1987)
- Slacky Flat (1988)
- On the Coal (1988)
- Lights Out, Nellie Martin (1990)
- The Last Voyage of the Gracie Anne (1993)
- ...That Christmas of '75 (1995)
- Vida (1996)
- Alma and Ivy, Molly and Merle (1997)
- The Season of Emily Jane (1999)
- This Other Eden (2001) The Season of Emily Jane and This Other Eden are two parts of a trilogy.
- Soft Target (2002)
- Horse Shoe Bend (1992) – for Maitland Repertory Society
- Alma (1993) – for Sydney Festival and Carnivale
- Under the House (1993)- for the Faculty of Creative Arts, University of Wollongong.
- Valerie Paterson – Where can She Live? (1995)- for The Illawarra Christian Performing Arts Company
- The Year 2000– Coming, Ready or Not (1999) – for Community Group Recreation Illawarra
- The script for the re-enactment of the landing of the "Tom Thumb" at Towradgi – for the Wollongong City Council Heritage Committee.
- The soundscape for the Bulli Miner's cottage – for the Bulli Miner's Cottage Committee
- Four Kembla Women, a monologue (2006) – for the launch of Heritage Week in the Illawarra

== Published works ==
- Windy Gully, Currency Press, (1989), ISBN 978-0-86819-245-1.
- Three Illawarra Plays, Australian Playwright Signature Series, University of Wollongong, (1997), ISBN 1-875604-55-3

== See also ==
- Mining in Australia
- Order of Australia
