= Fred Moore (Australian activist) =

Australian trade unionist (1922–2022)

Fred Moore (5 September 1922 – 21 January 2022) was an Australian activist for workers' rights, trade unionist and author who was associated with the South Coast of New South Wales, in particular the Mount Kembla area. He had a significant career in the mining industry for over fifty years.

== Early life ==
Moore was born in Cobar, New South Wales, on 5 September 1922. He entered the mining industry at age fourteen.

== Activism ==
He was heavily involved in the trade union movement and the Miners' Federation, and became a key figure in campaigning for workers' rights in Australia, as well as agitating for Aboriginal rights. As a result, he was initiated as an Aboriginal tribal elder in the Illawarra, as well as a blood-brother to the Jerrinja people. He was known to local Kooris and other activists as "dad". Moore served as chairman of the May Day Committee for over twenty years, and was bestowed life-member status of the Miners Federation and the Miners' Women's Auxiliary. Prior to his death, he was the only living man to have been made an honorary member of this movement. Also a founding member of the First Aboriginal Political movement the indigenous advancement league, he was actively involved in all forms of activism, leading strikes and protests and all forms of civil demonstrations, ranging from the storming of Parliament House and the tent embassy, protesting against Indigenous deaths in custody and leading the May Day march every year for over 40+ years.

== Writings ==
Moore co-authored, with Ray Harrison and Paddy Gorman, two books on the oral history of mining; At the Coalface (1997), and Back at the Coalface (2008). He appeared in the 2008 documentary Beneath Black Skies, on mining history in the South Coast of NSW, Australia, as one of the interview subjects.

== Recognition ==
The former South Coast Trade Union Centre in Wollongong CBD, and the newer Fred Moore House, home of the CFMEU (Construction Forestry Mining & Energy Union), have both been named in the honour of his tireless work for unity within the fields of industrial relations, and human rights. In addition to this, he was also honoured with a memorial on the "Together Wall", at the Jumbulla Aboriginal Discovery Centre, Bulli Pass, which tells of how a group of women along with Fred Moore, became involved in assisting the indigenous people in their lobbying and protesting in regards to improving their poor living conditions. The South Coast Trade Union Centre, "Fred Moore House" was named in his honour.

== Death ==
Moore died at this home in Dapto, New South Wales, on 21 January 2022, at the age of 99.
