= Cordeaux Heights =

- Suburb
- Coordinates: 34°26.38′S 150°50.06′E
- Country: Australia
- State: New South Wales
- LGA: City of Wollongong
- Location: 87 km (54 mi) from Sydney; 8 km (5.0 mi) from Wollongong; 32 km (20 mi) from Kiama

Government
  - State electorate: Wollongong
  - Federal division: Cunningham

Area
  - Total: 3.8 km^{2} (1.5 sq mi)
- Elevation: 92 m (302 ft)

Population
  - Total: 4,460 (2021 census)
  - Density: 1,174/km^{2} (3,040/sq mi)
- Postcode: 2526
Suburbs around Cordeaux Heights
Mount Kembla		Figtree
	Cordeaux Heights
Farmborough Heights		Unanderra

Cordeaux Heights is a suburb in the city of Wollongong, New South Wales, Australia. It is situated on the eastern foothills of Mount Kembla as is its southern neighbour Farmborough Heights. Its northern boundary of housing is along Cordeaux Road which goes to Mount Kembla Village. Cordeaux Heights has several shops, including a cafe, supermarket/takeaway, bottle shop, hairdresser, dentist and pizzeria.

== History ==
Up to 1973, the area which today is the site of Cordeaux Heights, was made up of 3 dairy farms, and had been grazed extensively. At this time, the farms were purchased by R. W. Sheargold Pty. Ltd., for the potential development of a new suburb (R.W. Sheargold, 1974).

In 1974, a feasibility study was carried out by the company Golder, Moss Associates, Consulting Geotechnical Engineers. In April, 1979, Wollongong City Council formulated a Development Strategy – Cordeaux Heights Estate, to be put to a Special Meeting of council held on 9 April 1979. The area of land released was sufficient to provide housing and amenities for up to 5,000 people (Forbes and Associates, 1978; Dunk, K.R., 1979).

The plan was based on road and allotment layout being primarily dictated by pedestrian movement within the neighbourhood. The suburb was to include dedicated open space of not less than 3 hectares per 1,000 head of population, to cater for active and passive recreational activities. The developer was also required to construct a new section of road to facilitate access to and within the new suburb. The road layout and design was based on a hierarchical function of roads, conforming to the road strategy in the Unanderra area, with main distributors (Central Road and Cordeaux Road), and minor collector roads to service the area. Such things as bus routes, services (schools), accessibility around the suburb by both cars and pedestrians, and protection of the environment, were all factored into the development (Dunk, K.R., 1979).

Cordeaux Heights was named after William Cordeaux (1792−1839), an early resident and land commissioner.

== Schools ==
- Illawarra Christian School
- Unanderra Public School
- Western Suburbs Childcare Centre (Big Fat Smile)
