= Illawarra Christian School =

Location
- 4 Tyalla Place, Cordeaux Heights, Wollongong, Illawarra region, New South Wales; Australia; 34°26′36″S 150°49′49″E

Information
- Type: Christian parent-controlled school
- Motto: In Christ's Service
- Established: 1982; 44 years ago
- Principal: Simon Lainson
- Grades: Preschool to Year 12
- Gender: Co-educational
- Enrolment: 650
- Website: www.ics.nsw.edu.au

Illawarra Christian School (ICS) is a co-educational Christian parent-controlled school in Cordeaux Heights, Wollongong, New South Wales, Australia that was established in 1982 and it offers from Preschool to Year 12 education. It began its Prep program in 2008. The school currently caters for more than 650 students across all years.

== History ==
In 2008, Simon Lainson was appointed the third principal of the school. The school currently employs 62 teaching staff.

== Governance ==
Illawarra Christian School is governed by Illawarra Christian Education.

== Associated Schools ==
Illawarra Christian School currently has a sister school operated by Illawarra Christian Education:

- Calderwood Christian School, Albion Park

== See also ==
- List of non-government schools in New South Wales
- List of schools in Illawarra and the South East
- Education in Australia
