= Jade Buddha for Universal Peace =

Jade statue of the Gautama Buddha

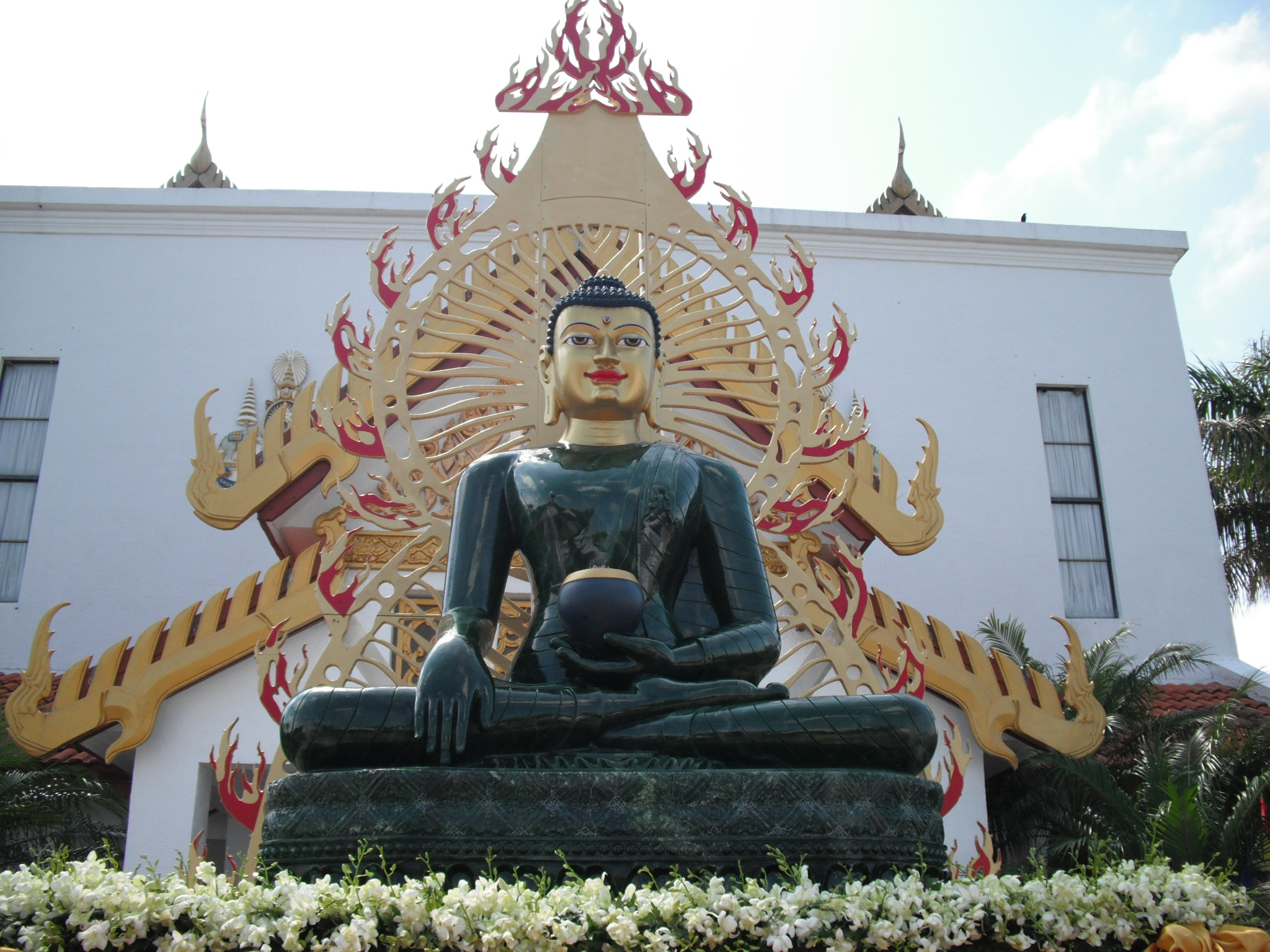
The Jade Buddha on display

The Jade Buddha for Universal Peace is a jade statue of the Gautama Buddha sourced from northern Canada in 2000 and carved by Thai artisans. It is made of polar jade, which is a kind of nephrite. It stands 2.7 metres (8 ft 10 in) high, sitting on a solid alabaster throne of 1.4 metres (4 ft 7 in) high, and is valued at more than A$25 million. The four-tonne statue was created for the Great Stupa of Universal Compassion in Bendigo, Victoria, in Australia and was consecrated by the Dalai Lama.

Its model is the Buddha statue of the Mahabodhi Temple in Bodh Gaya, India, which is universally recognized by all Buddhists. The statue toured the world with the purpose of raising awareness of Buddhism and promoting peace. The statue is particularly revered by the global Vietnamese Buddhist community.

== Tour ==
The purpose of exhibiting the Jade Buddha around the world was to raise awareness of Buddhism and promote peace.

Lama Zopa Rinpoche said that "It will illuminate the world and bring inconceivable peace and happiness and help prevent the destruction that is happening so much in the world, including war."

"I want to emphasize the importance of so many people, I think it seems millions of people, who have seen the statue and have therefore have had strong imprints placed in their minds for enlightenment. … Please remember the benefits to sentient beings in what you are doing with the tour, by people even merely seeing the Jade Buddha, ultimately brings them extensive benefit."

The Jade Buddha was on tour to major cities around the world before it was finally placed inside the Great Stupa of Universal Compassion in Bendigo.
