= Cringila =

- Suburb
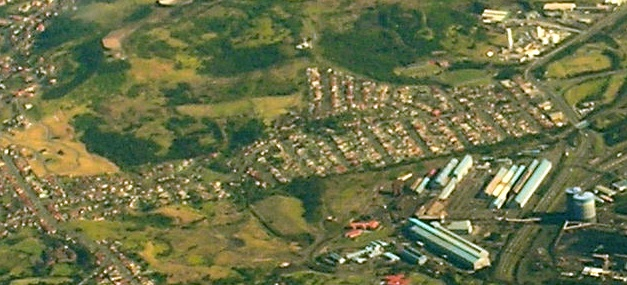
- Aerial photo from east

- Coordinates: 34°28′16″S 150°52′19″E
- Country: Australia
- State: New South Wales
- City: Wollongong
- LGA: Wollongong City Council
- Location: 90 km (56 mi) from Sydney; 6 km (3.7 mi) from Wollongong; 28 km (17 mi) from Kiama
- Established: 1928

Government
  - State electorate: Wollongong
  - Federal division: Cunningham

Area
  - Total: 2.6 km^{2} (1.0 sq mi)
- Elevation: 12 m (39 ft)

Population
  - Total: 2,156 (2021 census)
  - Density: 829/km^{2} (2,150/sq mi)
- Postcode: 2502
Suburbs around Cringila
Unanderra	Spring Hill
Berkeley	Cringila	Port Kembla
Berkeley	Lake Heights	Warrawong

Cringila (/krɪndʒɪlə/) is a southern suburb of the city of Wollongong, New South Wales, Australia. The suburb is bounded by Berkeley, Unanderra, Lake Heights and Warrawong.

The suburb is planned on a north-south residential/commercial strip and the east west streets that adjoin it, making a rectangular pattern.

Cringila Community Park is a 78 ha site purchased by Wollongong City Council after residents defeated a proposal by BHP to use the land as a dump for industrial waste. Its main purpose is to regenerate the local area's natural wildlife. Surrounding Cringila's primary school is a protected rain forest.

A fraction of Cringila is the Port Kembla steelworks, which is a major local employer. This led to an influx of ethnic groups, primarily Macedonian, Portuguese, Turks and Lebanese. This in turn transformed the demographics of Cringila significantly and at the 2001 census more people lived in households where Macedonian was spoken (31.8%) than in households where only English was spoken (24.6%), making it the only suburb in Australia where this was true. However, at the 2021 census only 16.2% of the population lived in households where Macedonian was spoken and 40.8% lived in households where only English was spoken.

== History ==
The word Cringila is an Aboriginal name - the town was formerly called Steeltown. In 1928 the first blast furnace opened up at the Port Kembla steelworks.

In 1935, the first public school opened, it was known as Steel Town School. In 1957, Cringila Primary School opened.

== Shopping ==
The main operating shops include Abdul's Butcher, the Cringila Hotel, a few burek shops, a newsagency, a pharmacy and convenience store. Other businesses include a petrol station, kebab shops, and a florist.

== Sport ==
Cringila also has a local football (soccer) team which participates in the local Illawarra Premier League. They are supported strongly by the Macedonian community of Cringila and Wollongong. They play their local games at their home ground at John Crehan Park, Merrett Avenue, Cringila. In 2008 Cringila Lions had finished 4th in the local Illawarra Premier League and also won the Corrimal League cup which also led to greater success in winning the Bert Bampton Cup. Cringila Lions have a strong rivalry with Wollongong United also backed heavily by the Macedonian community. In 2026 Cringila Lions had finished best place 3rd in Illawarra Premier League.

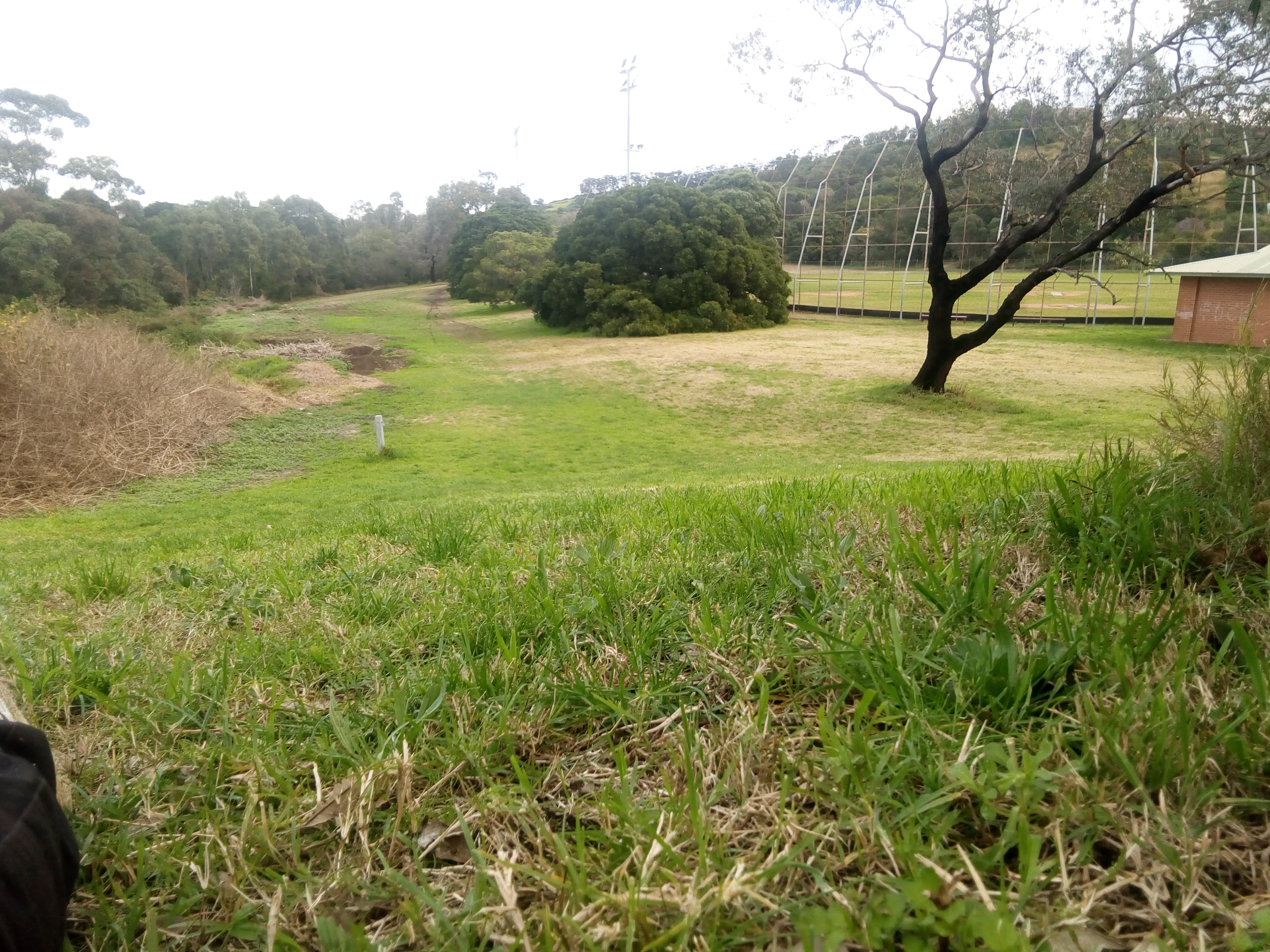
Cringila Community Park

== Transport ==
Cringila railway station is on the Port Kembla Branch of the South Coast railway line, although this station is somewhat far from the residential areas of Cringila.

== Demographics ==
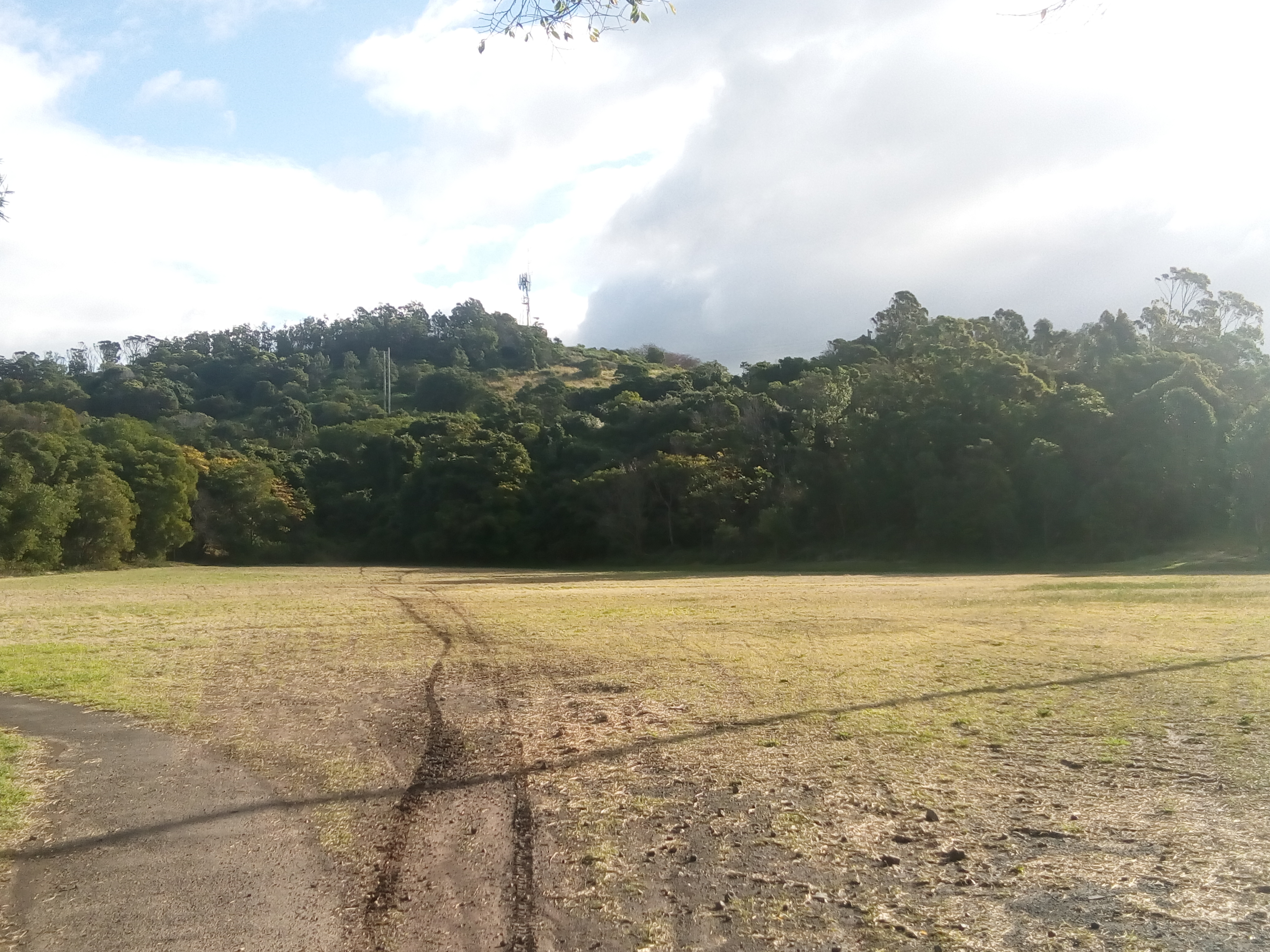
Cringila Community Park

At the 2021 census, Cringila had a total population of 2,156 with 1,148 (53.2%) born in Australia and a median age of 38. Their country of birth was as follows:

Country of birth	Number	Percentage of total inhabitants
Australia	1,148	53.2%
Macedonia	272	12.6%
Lebanon	139	6.4%
Syria	61	2.8%
Turkey	39	1.8%
Portugal	28	1.3%

40.8% of people spoke only English at home. Other languages spoken at home included Arabic 18.1% and Macedonian 16.2%. The most common responses for religion were Islam 29.1%, No Religion 20.1%, Eastern Orthodox 14.8%, Catholic 13.2% and Not stated 7.1%.

== See also ==
- Macedonian Australian
