= Kembla Grange =

- Suburb
- Coordinates: 34°27′57″S 150°49′02″E
- Country: Australia
- State: New South Wales
- City: Wollongong
- LGA: City of Wollongong
- Location: 92 km (57 mi) SSW of Sydney; 9 km (5.6 mi) SW of Wollongong; 32 km (20 mi) N of Kiama

Government
  - State electorate: Shellharbour
  - Federal divisions: Cunningham; Whitlam
- Elevation: 9 m (30 ft)

Population
  - Total: 1,452 (2021 census)
- Postcode: 2526
Suburbs around Kembla Grange
	Farmborough Heights	Unanderra
	Kembla Grange	Berkeley
Brownsville	Kanahooka	Lake Illawarra

Kembla Grange is a suburb west of Berkeley, in the City of Wollongong. At the 2021 census, it had a population of 1,452.

The Kembla Grange Racecourse and its railway station are located there.

== History ==
Kembla Grange takes its name from Mount Kembla, which was believed to be an Aboriginal term "wild game hunting".

The area around what is known as Kembla Grange was originally known as Dunlop Vale after John Dunlop Vale. In 1829, Governor Ralph Darling instructed Surveyor Knapp to survey 10 lots of 100 acres for war veterans.

In 1840, Gerard Gerard named the parcel "Kembla Grange". In the same decade, it became a leading area for dairy farming.

In the late 19th century, the railway line linked through Kembla Grange and with the opening of the railway station in 1890, its railway platform was mentioned in timetables.

On 26 August 1962, the Kembla Grange Speedway opened. It was located at (34°28′20″S 150°49′34″E) and held racing for many classes, including sprint cars, sedans and stock cars. The venue hosted motorcycle speedway and held the New South Wales Individual Speedway Championship twice in 1962 to 1963.

On 18 December 1976, the Kembla Grange Racecourse opened (adjacent to the Kembla Grange Speedway track) when the Illawarra Turf Club was formed and conducted its first race meeting. The Kembla Grange racecourse hosts the $1 million The Gong annually in November at the Illawarra Turf Club's metropolitan standalone meeting.

On 3 June 1983, the Speedway track closed.
