= Mount Kembla =

- Suburb
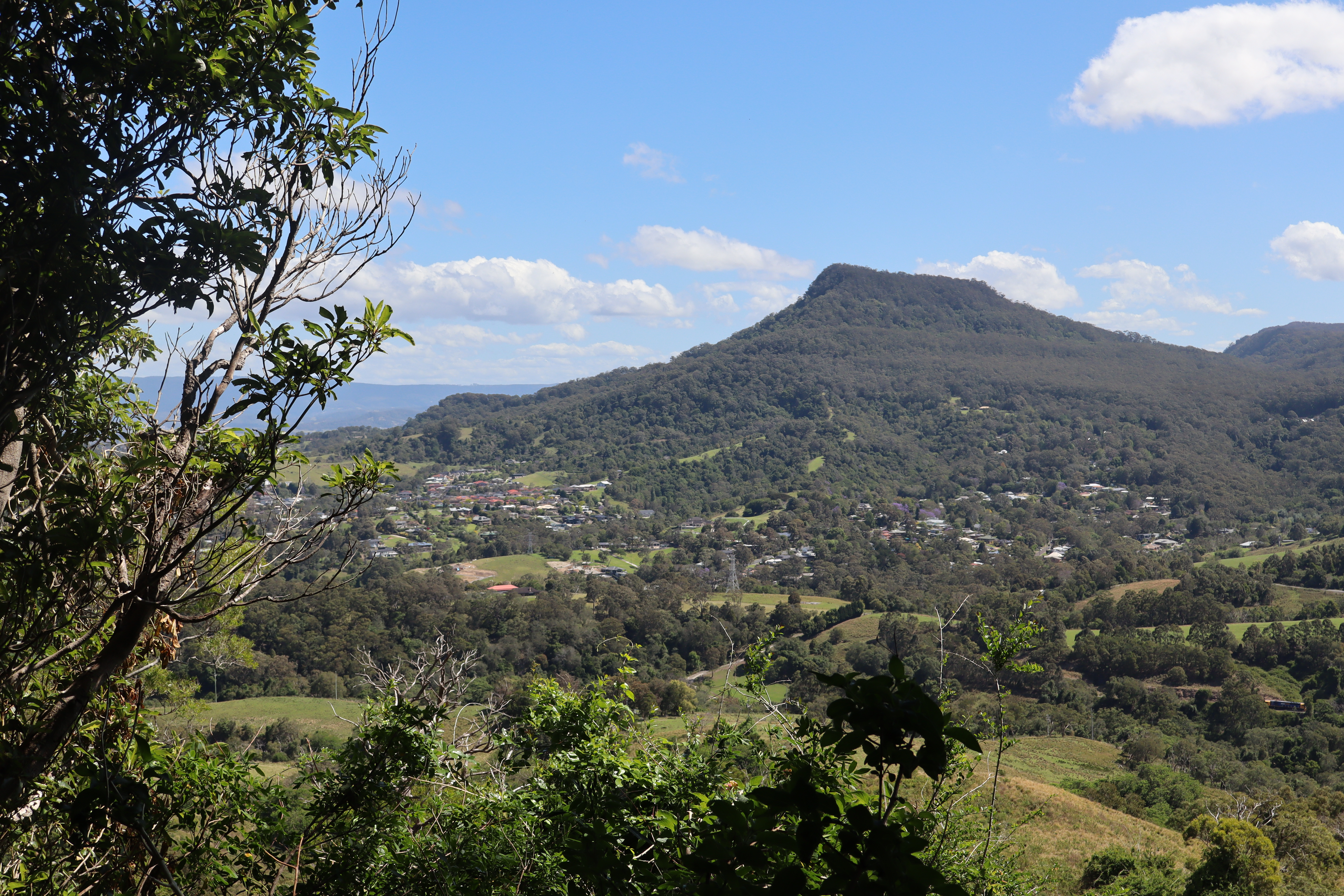
- View of Mount Kembla from O'Briens Trail in 2024.
- Coordinates: 34°25′43″S 150°49′28″E
- Country: Australia
- State: New South Wales
- City: Wollongong
- LGA: City of Wollongong

Government
  - State electorate: Wollongong
  - Federal division: Cunningham

Area
  - Total: 1.6 km^{2} (0.62 sq mi)
- Elevation: 534 m (1,752 ft)

Population
  - Total: 1,083 (2021 census)
  - Density: 677/km^{2} (1,750/sq mi)
- Postcode: 2526
Suburbs around Mount Kembla
		Figtree
Kembla Heights	Mount Kembla	Cordeaux Heights
		Farmborough Heights

Mount Kembla
- Hat Hill
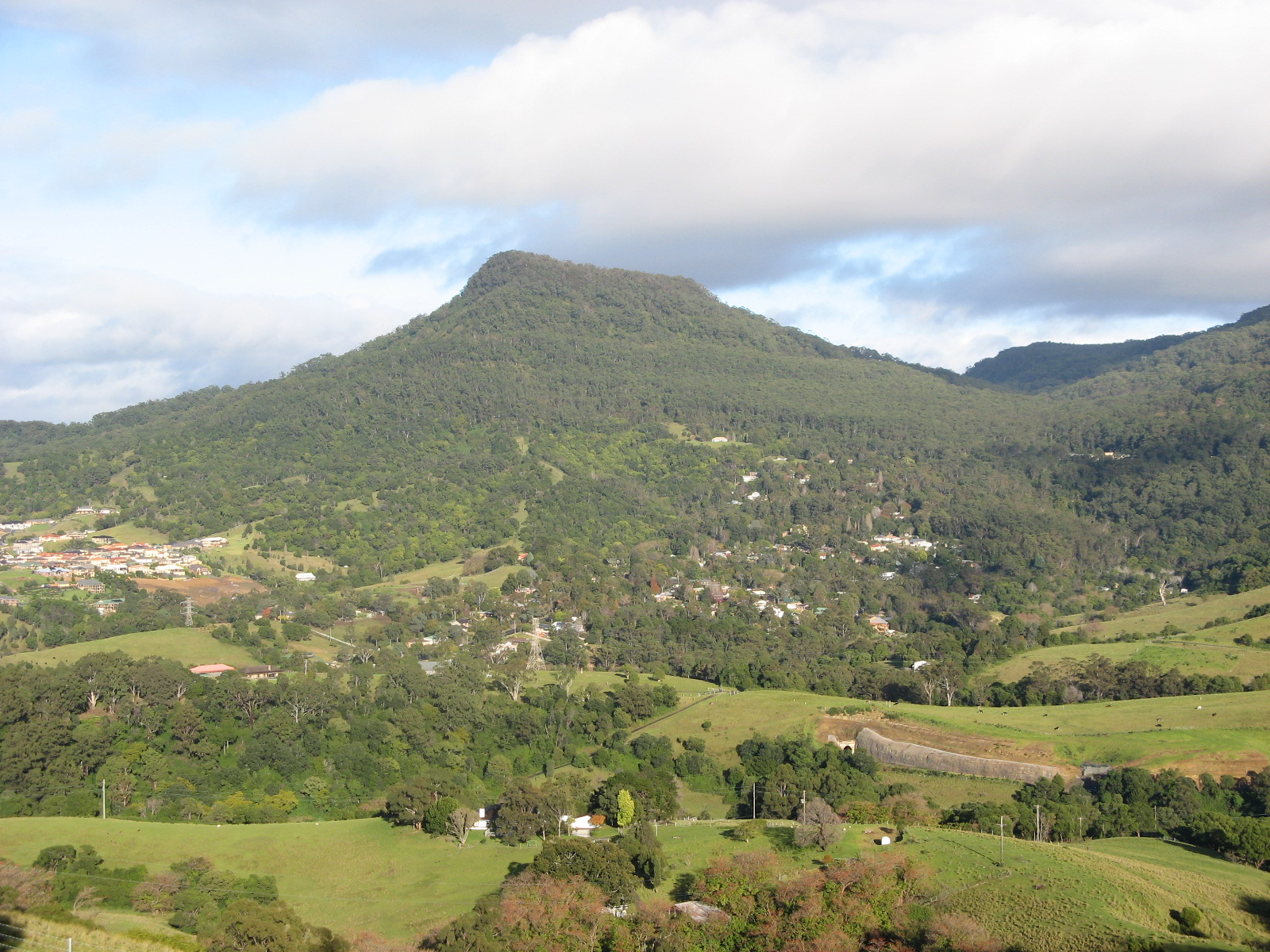
- View of Mount Kembla from Mount Nebo

Highest point
- Elevation: 534 m (1,752 ft)
- Coordinates: 34°26′30″S 150°48′30″E

Geography
- Location within New South Wales
- Location: Illawarra region, New South Wales, Australia

Mount Kembla /ˈkɛmblə/ is a suburb and a mountain in the Illawarra region of New South Wales, Australia. Mount Kembla is 6 kilometres (4 miles) west of Wollongong and 72 kilometres (45 miles) south of Sydney in the City of Wollongong.

The suburb is a semi-rural township of Wollongong. It is named after the adjacent Mount Kembla, which is located on the Illawarra escarpment. The summit has an elevation of 534 metres (1,752 ft) above sea level.

The name Mount Kembla is derived from an Aboriginal word, kembla, meaning "plenty of game". The satellite localities of Kembla Heights, Windy Gully, Cordeaux Valley and Kembla Village are also parts of the suburb of Mount Kembla, which at the time of the 2021 census, had a population of 1,083.

The area surrounding Mount Kembla is a coal mining area, notable for the Mount Kembla Mine disaster of 1902 in which 96 people died.

== Mount Kembla Village ==
Mount Kembla Village includes a local primary school, church and graveyard, several hundred houses and the Mount Kembla Village Hotel, which was opened in 1898. There is a heritage centre showcasing local history. The village is accessible from Wollongong, via Cordeaux Road, named after early settlers; and from Mount Keira via Harry Graham Drive. The small village of Kembla Heights lies to the northwest. South32 currently operates the Dendrobium Mine, half a kilometre west of the village.

The Mount Kembla Colliery was established in 1883, and the purpose-built township was constructed by the company to house the employees. In 1970, the colliery closed and the town lost its general store, post office, Presbyterian church, tennis courts and public telephones during the following years. The general store and post office closed in 2010, making it the first time in 145 years the village has been without one. A tennis court has since opened on Stafford Road, and a new children's playground was built at Ryan Park in 2021.

== History ==
The original inhabitants of Mount Kembla are the Dharawal people. Local Aboriginal legends told of Mount Kembla and Mount Keira being sisters and the Five Islands being daughters of the wind.

The first European to observe the mountain was Captain James Cook on his voyage from Whitby. While navigating the east coast of Australia, he noted it as 'a round hill', its top resembling a hat. The village was established in 1817 by George Molle.

During European times Mount Kembla has had a very significant role in mining industry. Mount Kembla is noted as being the home of the first kerosene mine in Australia. This mine was located near American Creek on land owned by John Graham, who remained one of the proprietors once mining operations commenced in mid July 1865. Coal mining has been the main industry in the area and continues presently with Dendrobium Mine still operating.

In addition to mining, Mount Kembla has a significant agricultural history; in particular the Cordeaux Valley area which was one of Australia's top fruit growing industries, exporting as far away as London in its heyday as one of the country's best apple producers.

== Mine disaster ==
On 31 July 1902 the Mount Kembla Colliery exploded, killing 96 men and boys. The Mount Kembla Mine disaster was the second worst post-settlement peace-time disaster of Australia's history (behind Cyclone Mahina), until the 2009 Black Saturday bushfires in Victoria.

=== The mine ===
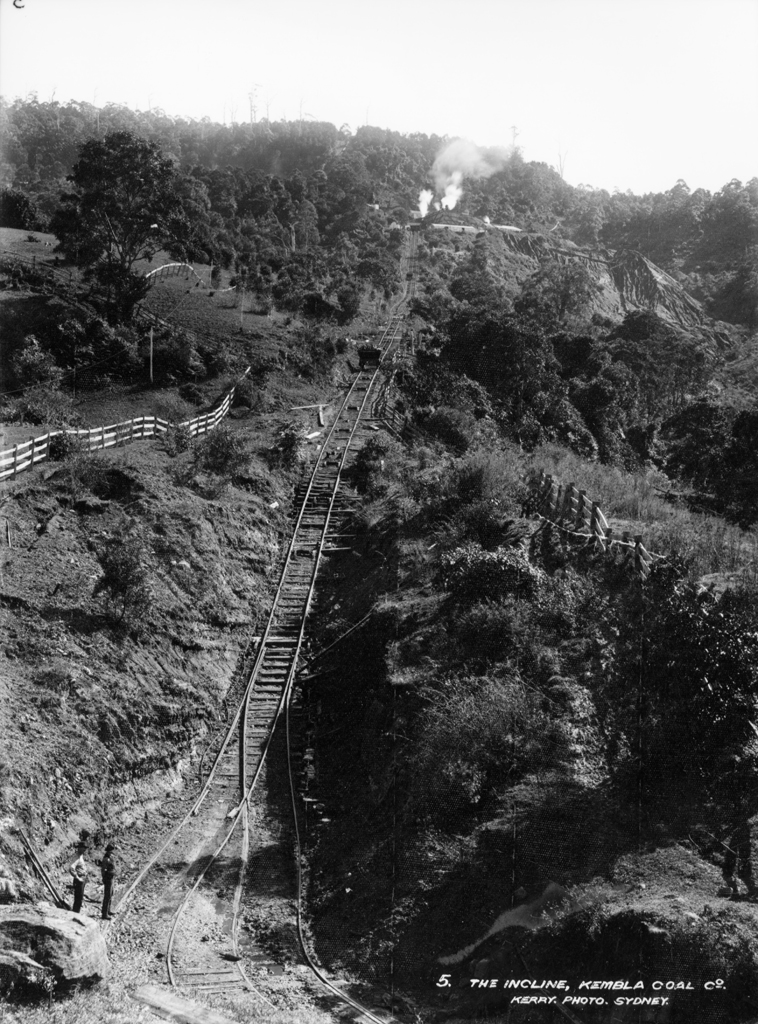
Mount Kembla Colliery railway incline, c.1900

The Mount Kembla mine worked the Bulli seam which outcrops at 800 feet (240 m) above sea level on the side of Mount Kembla. The coal was worked through a drift mine with additional adits for ventilation and drainage. There are two main haulage roadways. (Note: "Haulage road" – A tunnel used for transporting the coal to the entrance.) The "Main Tunnel" roadway extends from the entrance in a north-westerly direction. The other main haulage way is called "No. 1 Right" and branches off the main tunnel 12 chains (790 ft; 240 m) in from the mouth. No. 1 Right runs due north. Branching off No. 1 Right are other passageways named "First Right", "Second Left" and so forth. The "Eastern District" is at the end of No 1 Right and this is where the explosion occurred.

The mine was originally ventilated by return roads (Note: "Return road" – A tunnel used for foul air returning from the face to the entrance) to the entrance and a furnace (Note: Before mechanical fans became commonplace mines were ventilated by using the stack effect. A furnace was kept burning at the foot of a shaft which acted as a chimney. Hot air rising up the shaft drew fresh air around the mine.) there. By the time of the explosion a new upcast shaft (Note: "Upcast" – a shaft where the ventilation is drawn or forced upwards to the surface) had been sunk over 400 feet (120 m) from the surface to the "Shaft district". A furnace at the foot of the shaft drove the ventilation. The original return roads had then been converted to intakes and were used as travelling roads.

A quote from the mine manager, William Rogers, stated that the mine was "absolutely without danger from gases", the Illawarra Mercury reported that "gas had never been known to exist in the mine before" and The Sydney Morning Herald recorded "one of the best ventilated mines in the State".

The Royal Commission noted that the seam was the same one as at the Bulli Colliery some 9 miles (14 km) to the north-east. Bulli had been the site of a fire-damp and coal-dust explosion which had killed 81 people in 1887. Over four pages the commission summarised around 20 incidents of fire-damp which were reported to them. As a result of the evidence produced the commission tested parts of the mine themselves and found gas being given off "in several widely distant parts of the mine". They accepted that under normal circumstances the ventilation would deal with the problem but "This result ... leads the Commission irresistibly to the conclusion ... that, given favourable conditions for accumulation, a dangerous collection might be found in almost any part of the workings".

At the time of the disaster around 270 acres (110 ha) of the mine's 769 acres (311 ha) had been worked out. All the coal had been removed and the resulting space was termed a "goaf". When the props were withdrawn the roof was allowed to fall into the goaf.

=== The disaster ===
At around 14:00 on 31 July 1902 a large amount of flame and smoke burst from the main tunnel, accompanied by a loud noise. (Note: Although the sound of the explosion could be heard nine miles (14 km) away, survivors reported feeling or hearing nothing apart from a momentary sensation of deafness or feeling suffocated.) Other adits had smoke driven out from them. 261 men were underground at the time, but after the blast some of them managed to escape.

The Royal Commission produced a summary of their findings about the cause and mechanism of the disaster. A roof fall in the 4th Right goaf drove out a considerable amount of a fire-damp/air mixture. The mixture passed along the 4th Right road crossing the No. 1 Right traveling road and bursting through the canvas doors into No 1 Right haulage road. As the mixture travelled it raised coal dust which was carried with it. The mixture started to travel outbye (Note: "outbye" – away from the coal face towards the entrance) before being stopped by the ventilation air current and forced back inbye. (Note: "inbye" – towards the coal face) Some of the gas travelled ahead of the main pocket further inbye where it met the naked light used by a wheeler at the 4th Left junction. Once strong enough to ignite it flashed back along the haulage road to the main body of the gas. The fire-damp/coal-dust/air mixture then exploded. The force of the explosion raised more coal-dust leading to further explosions until the flame was seen to come out of the entrance.

The explosions "wrecked a large portion of the mine" and killed some miners. The incomplete combustion of the coal-dust resulted in the production of carbon monoxide, or after-damp. The after-damp was responsible for the majority of the deaths.

During the explosion the shaft district, where the ventilation furnace was, was not affected. The furnace continued to draw air through the mine and clear the after-damp. Since all drifts and adits were intakes the rescuers were able to enter the mine as the after-damp cleared. They were further hindered by roof falls caused by the explosion. Two of the rescuers, Mr H. O. MacCabe and William McMurray, pushed ahead too fast and were killed by the after-damp.

=== Inquiries ===
The day following the explosion the coroner at Wollongong opened an inquiry into the cause of death of the first of the miners brought out. Over the period from 1 August to 12 September 1902 the inquest sat on 22 days hearing evidence from 28 witnesses and visiting the mine. The Jury returned a verdict that the Meurant brothers and William Nelson "came to their death … from carbon monoxide poisoning produced by an explosion of fire-damp ignited by the naked lights in use in the mine, and accelerated by a series of coal-dust explosions starting at a point in or about the number one main level back headings, and extending in a westerly direction to the small goaf, marked 11 perches [180 ft; 55 m] on the mine plan."

A royal commission concerning the disaster was appointed on 6 November 1902 and held hearings in March, April and May 1903. The commission came to a different verdict from the coroner's jury. In the first place they queried the meaning of "accelerated by a series of coal-dust explosions" pointing out that the coal-dust explosions were part of the initial blast and not a factor coming into play some time later. The commission then disagreed over the seat of the explosion, placing it at the junction of the 4th Right road and the No. 1 Haulage road, whereas the Coroner's jury had placed it at number one main level back headings.

Once the commission had decided that the likely cause of the explosion was the expulsion of fire-damp from the 4th Right goaf they considered whether blame could or should be attached to any person or persons. Rule 10 of the mine required the inspection weekly of the state of waste workings. This was not being done. The inspections that were done looked at the state of the roof which was being allowed to fall. No testing for gas seems to have occurred, in part because the roof was highly unstable. The commission concluded that no normal testing would have revealed the gas accumulation in the roof of the goaf.

Rather than holding any individual official of the Mount Kembla Company responsible, the Commission stated that only the substitution of safety lamps for flame lights could have saved the lives of the 96 victims. However, flame lights continued to be used well into the 1940s.

=== Aftermath ===
Some of the dead were buried in Mount Kembla's village cemetery, which also contains a 2.5-metre (8 ft 2 in)-tall memorial to the disaster, listing the names of the miners and two rescuers who perished. The majority were buried in the more remote Windy Gully cemetery, 1.5 kilometres (0.93 mi) south-west of the village, at which an annual memorial ceremony is observed during the Mt Kembla Mining Heritage Festival on the weekend after 31 July. In 2008, the Mount Kembla Memorial Pathway was built to commemorate the victims of the disaster.

== Geography ==
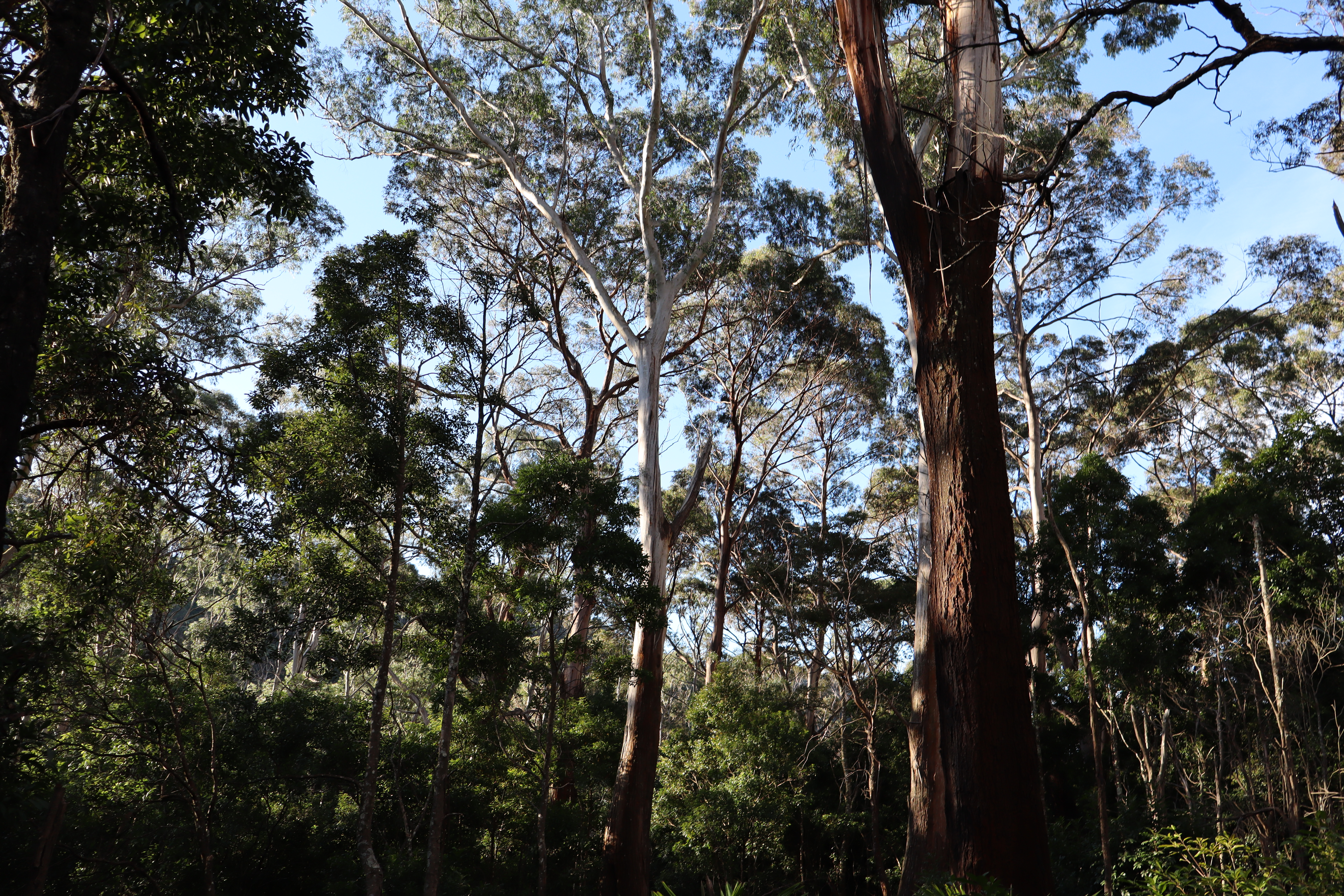
Bushland near the Mount Kembla ring track

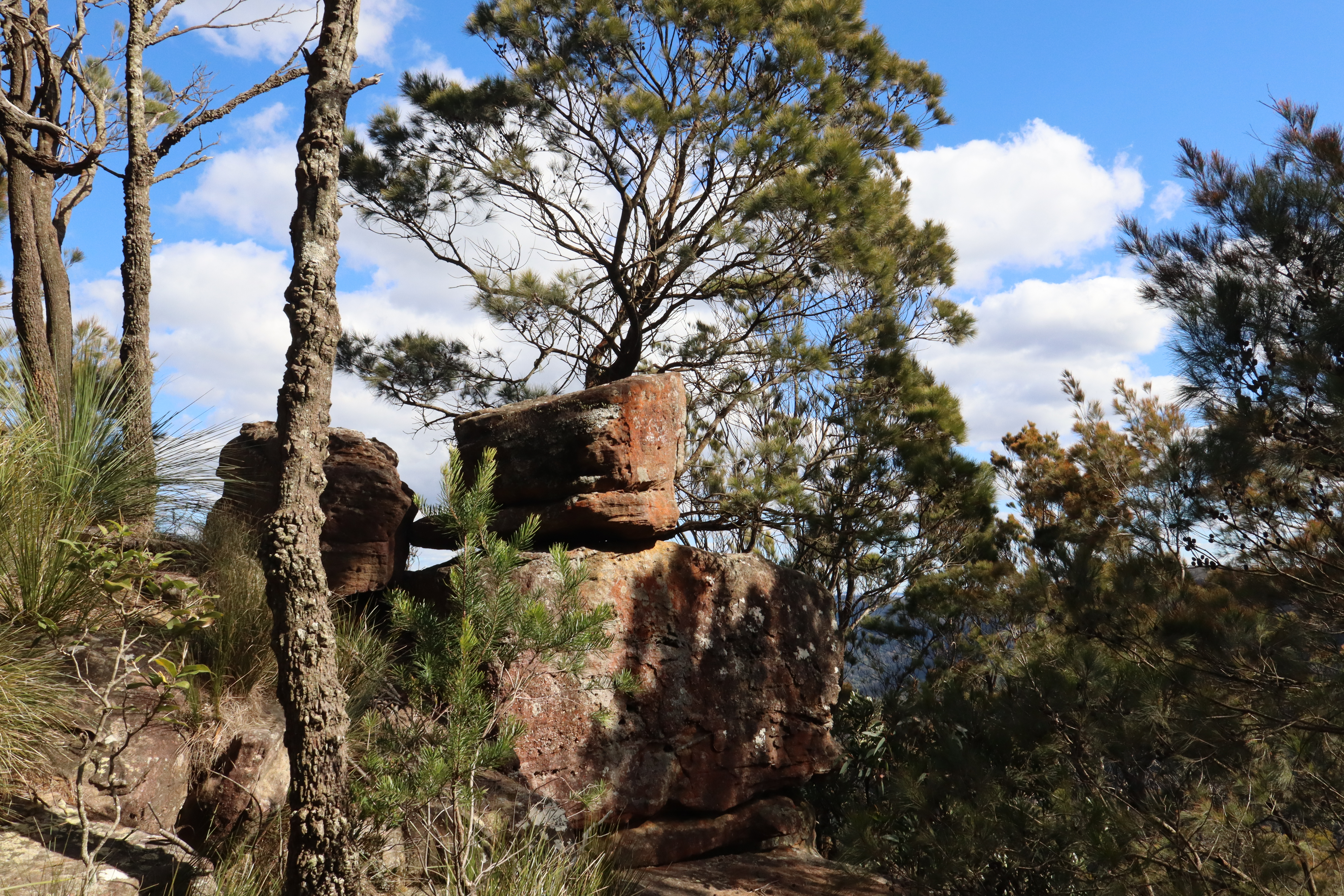
Boulders and she-oaks near the Mount Kembla summit

Mount Kembla is joined to the sandstone cliffs of the Illawarra escarpment, overlooking Wollongong. The summit is 534 metres (1,752 ft) above sea level and is a prominent local landmark. The mountain has a unique collection of flora, being the fusing point for northern and southern types of eucalypt growth and containing many types of rainforest. It also has two orchards on the western slope. American Creek flows down the mountain, past the mine and village.

The mountain is a high sandstone outcrop protruding about 2 kilometres east of the Illawarra Escarpment. It has a summit plateau divided into two sections, the eastern section raised slightly above the western section, forming a small rise at the top. The top of the mountain consists of a narrow ridge, with foothills below extending into the western suburbs of Wollongong.

Many tall trees are found in Mount Kembla and pockets of rainforest grow around Dapto Creek and American Creek. American Creek flows to the north of the mountain from the escarpment and Dapto Creek from the southern side. A prominent foothill lies at the mountain's southeast side, which sits above farmland.

Mount Kembla forms part of the Illawarra Escarpment State Conservation Area, which stretches from Stanwell Park in the north to Wongawilli in the south. The conservation area is managed by the NSW National Parks & Wildlife Service.

== Flora and fauna ==
Flora on the mountain includes blackwood, native peach, bastard rosewood, native cucumber, sandpaper fig, Moreton Bay fig, native ginger, native raspberries and hibiscus. Locally rare species include white beech and Bangalow palm.

Fauna includes marsupials such as wallabies, quolls, and bandicoots, wombats, possums and sugar gliders. There are also a variety of reptiles, including various frog species, water dragons, blue-tongued lizards, diamond pythons, red-bellied black snakes, and broad-headed snakes.

Birdlife includes lyrebirds, kookaburras, superb blue wrens, crimson rosellas, king parrots, rainbow lorikeets, little wattlebirds, grey and pied butcherbirds, black cockatoos, Australian magpies, pied currawongs, Australian ravens, noisy miners, honeyeaters, and eastern whipbirds. In 1804 a logrunner bird was collected on Mount Kembla, this being the first to be scientifically described.

The European and scientific discovery of the koala was made at Mount Kembla and took place between June–August 1803. Specimens were collected and taken to Sydney in August 1803 where they were figured by botanical draughtsman Ferdinand Bauer (1760–1826) and described by noted botanist Robert Brown (1773–1858). Koalas disappeared from the area gradually due to the effect of deforestation and habitat destruction by settlers—however they were noticeably absent after a large fire in 1909 swept the Cordeax Valley and Mount Kembla area. The last report of suspected koala activity was in 1919 in the Cordeaux area.

Introduced lantana weed has become a problem in the bushland of Mount Kembla, as have feral goats and deer.

== Walking tracks ==
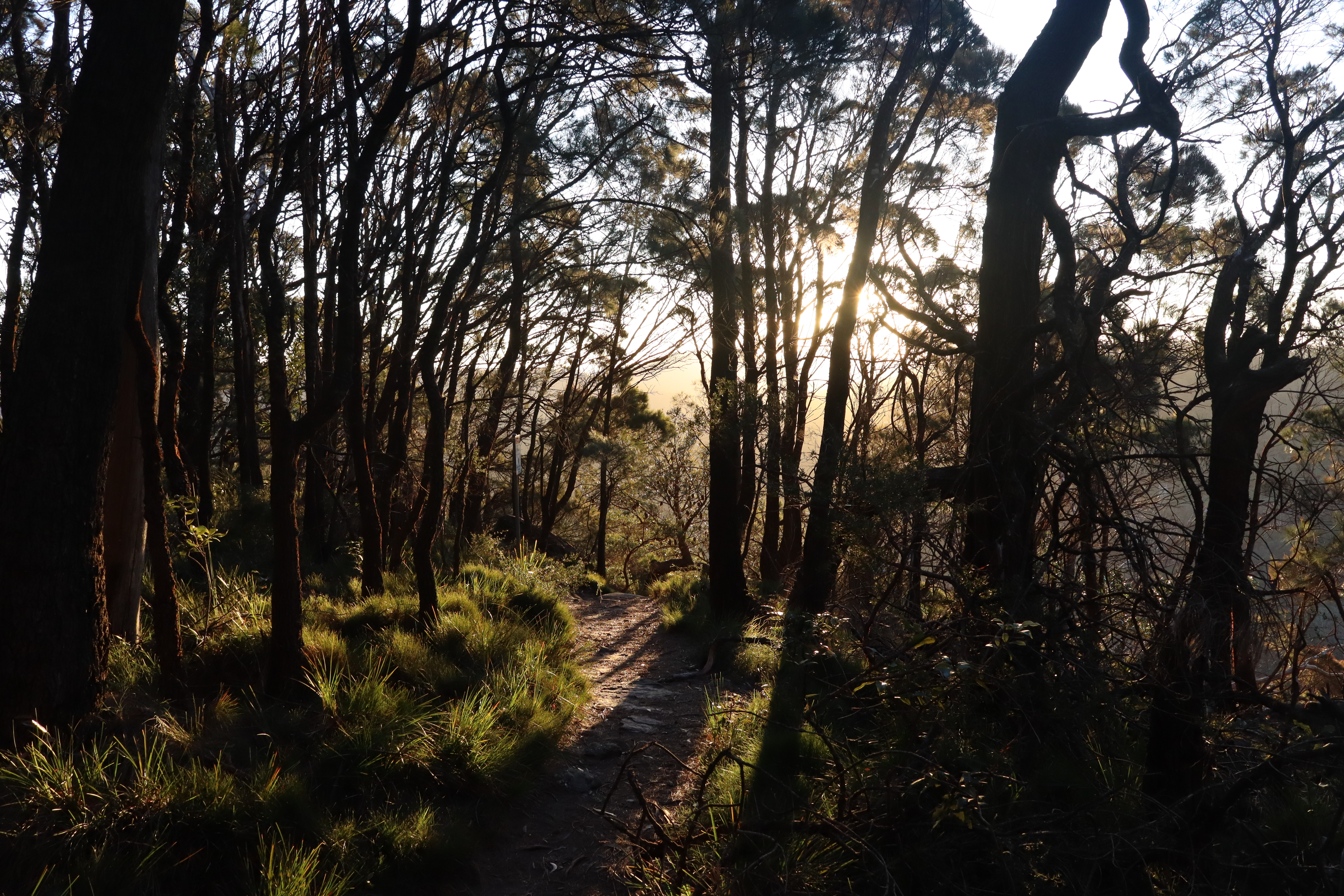
Mount Kembla summit track

Mount Kembla is popular with bushwalkers, and there are several walking tracks in the area.

The Mount Kembla Ring Track follows a circuit around the mountain starting from a carpark on Cordeaux Road. It follows stone steps down into a gully and through palm and fern growth. Two pit pony watering holes can be seen along the eastern section of the track. The northern section passes through canopied Sclerophyll growth. The track ends near Windy Gully Cemetery.

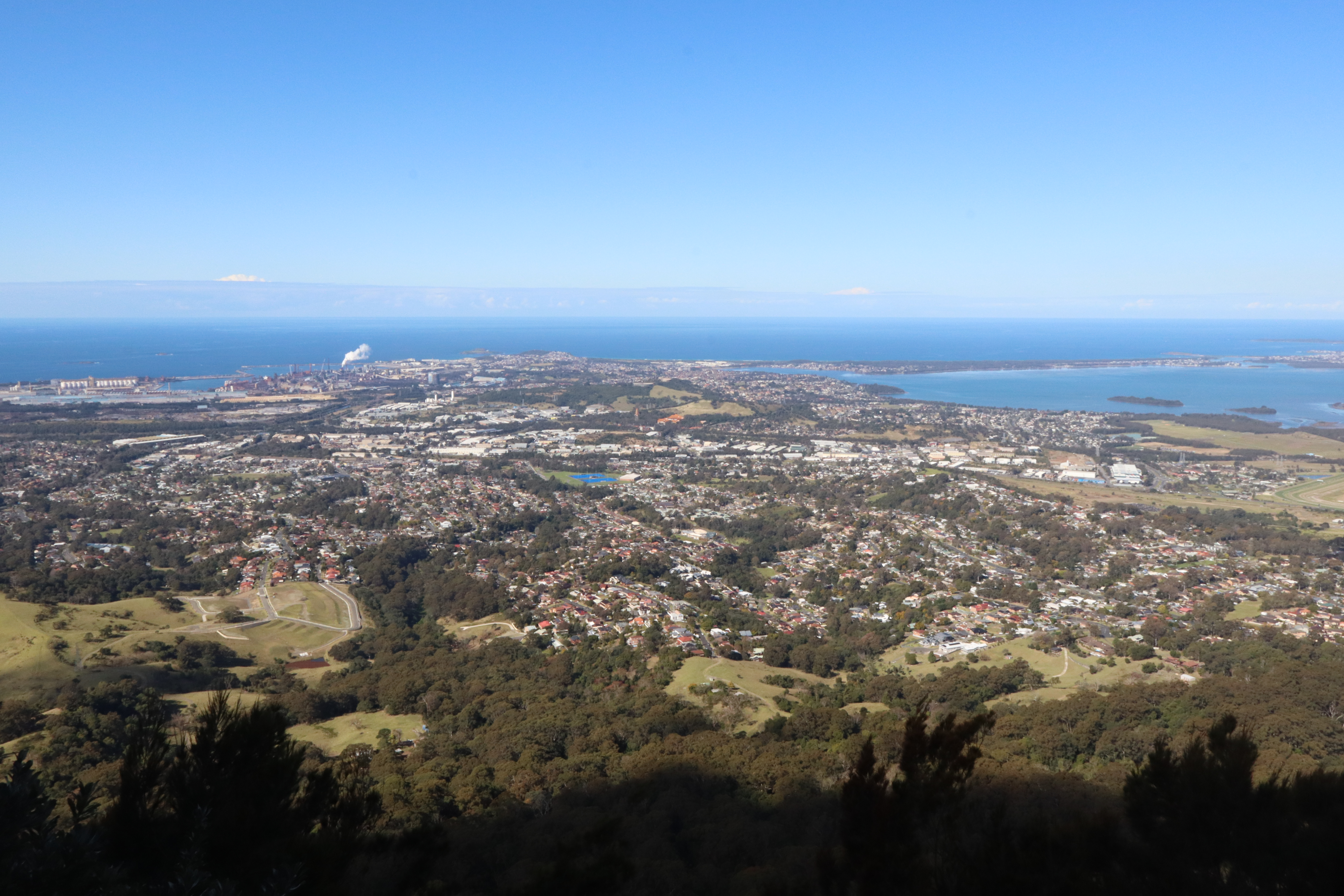
Western view from the Mount Kembla summit in August 2026. Port Kembla and Lake Illawarra are visible.

The Mount Kembla Summit Track follows the mountain ridge to a plateau and finishes at a lookout, which features a sweeping view of the Illawarra from Wollongong in the northeast to Saddleback Mountain in the south. The plateau is reached by climbing a series of boulders. Along the track, there are several rock outcrops with good views of the south and west.

A former bridle track starts on the west side of the Cordeaux Road carpark. It passes through Illawarra rainforest under the edge of the escarpment. Formerly, the track reached the Unanderra - Moss Vale railway line, but the trail is now overgrown several hundred metres before its end.

== Notable people ==
Mount Kembla is known for producing or attracting creative people; painters, poets, writers, photographers and history buffs are inspired by the area. Notable people include:

- Wendy Richardson OAM, a playwright
- John McNamara OAM, a poet and historian
- Fred Moore, a miner and activist.

== See also ==
- List of mountains of Australia § New South Wales
