= Berkeley, New South Wales =

Berkeley
- Suburb
- Coordinates: 34°28′50″S 150°50′46″E
- Country: Australia
- State: New South Wales
- City: Wollongong
- LGA: City of Wollongong
- Location: 92 km (57 mi) from Sydney; 10 km (6.2 mi) from Wollongong; 30 km (19 mi) from Kiama

Government
  - State electorate: Wollongong
  - Federal division: Cunningham
- Elevation: 8 m (26 ft)

Population
  - Total: 7,798 (2021 census)
- Postcode: 2506
Suburbs around Berkeley
| Unanderra | Mount Saint Thomas | Port Kembla |
| Kembla Grange | Berkeley | Cringila |
| Kanahooka | Lake Illawarra | Lake Heights |

Berkeley is a suburb of Wollongong, New South Wales. The suburb is located in Wollongong's southern suburbs, on the northern shore of Lake Illawarra, and is one of the city's most populous suburbs. At the 2021 census, it had a population of 7,798.

== History ==
Historically a farming community situated between the hills and Lake Illawarra, Berkeley became one of the Illawarra's solutions to a public housing shortage in the early years. Subsequently, several public housing developments were established and most of these are still in existence today in certain parts of the suburb. To date approximately close to one in four dwellings consist of public housing owned by Homes NSW. The suburb has however enjoyed significant growth in the last two decades, with younger working families moving into the district in search of new homes. Berkeley's distance from Wollongong and vast space at the time identified it as an attractive option to new families and today much of the farmland is occupied by housing estates marketed as Regency Heights. The Berkeley of today houses a rich mix of Wollongong's community, different from that typically associated with the area in the 1980s.

== Notable people ==
Vincent Massey (1926–2002), biochemist and enzymologist, was born in Berkeley.

== Overview ==
The suburb is home to a small shopping precinct that contains a supermarket, petrol station, pub, post office, community swimming pool, medical centre and other specialty stores/services. A Community Centre provides a meeting place for local residents. By the lake there are stretches of parkland and several jetties which provide locals with lakeside recreation options. The Easts Group owns and operates the local Berkeley Sports and Social Club located just outside the shopping precinct. Fred Finch Park is home to baseball fields and both indoor and outdoor basketball courts, acting as a hub for sports in the local area.

Several of the early streets in Berkeley are named after the original farm owners of the district.

Nan Tien Temple, the largest Buddhist temple in the southern hemisphere, is located in the suburb.

There are currently two primary schools in the area, the Berkeley Public School and Berkeley West Public School. Berkeley South Public School was closed at the end of the 2009 school year due to low attendance and students were reassigned between the other two primary schools. Berkeley is also home to a public high school, the Illawarra Sports High School. Originally known as Berkeley High School, the school changed its name in 1998 in line with becoming a sports-oriented school.

Public transport is provided by Premier Illawarra, a bus company contracted by the Transport for New South Wales to provide services to most of the Illawarra region.

Due to a history of drug abuse problems in Berkeley and the surrounding suburbs, the area houses several specialist drug and alcohol treatment centres, which includes the Wollongong Crisis Centre and Kedesh House. The Lake Illawarra Local Area Command provides police response to the suburb with NSW Ambulance providing response from its Warrawong Station.
