= Royal Botanic Garden, Sydney =

Botanic gardens in New South Wales, Australia

Royal Botanic Garden Sydney
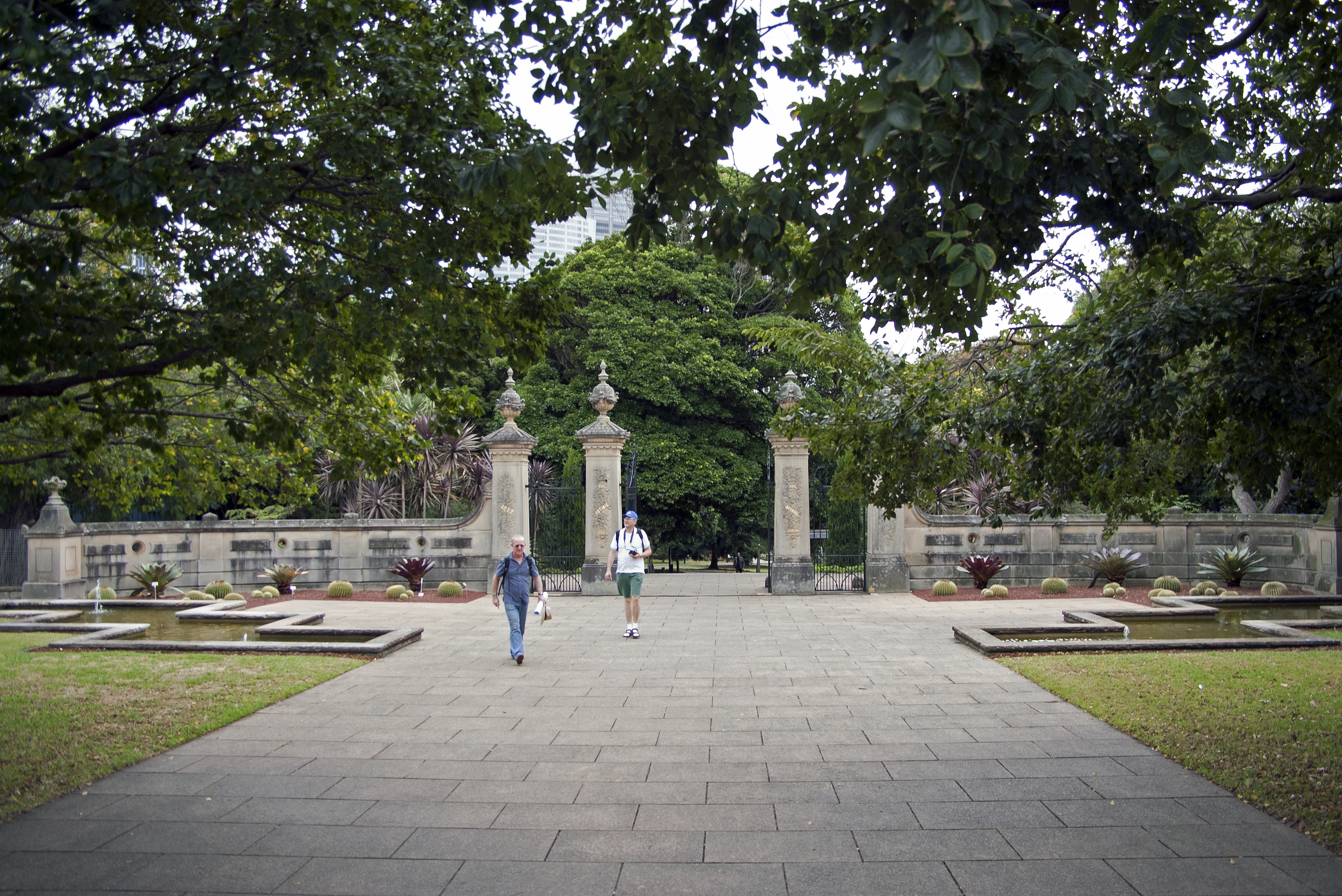
- Entrance to the Royal Botanic Garden from Art Gallery Road

- Location within Sydney
- Type: Botanic garden
- Location: Sydney, New South Wales, Australia (Map)
- Coordinates: 33°51′50″S 151°13′1″E
- Area: 30 hectares (74 acres)
- Created: 1816
- Founder: Governor Lachlan Macquarie
- Operator: Botanic Gardens of Sydney
- Visitors: 3,544,344 (in 2016)
- Open: October: 7.00 am–7:30 pm; November to February: 7.00 am–8.00 pm; March: 7.00 am–6.30 pm; April and September: 7.00 am–6.00 pm; May and August: 7.00 am–5.30 pm; June and July: 7.00 am–5.00 pm
- Status: Open all year
- Public transit: St James, Wynyard, Museum, Martin Place or Circular Quay; Martin Place; Circular Quay; 441; Circular Quay or QVB
- Website: www.botanicgardens.org.au/royal-botanic-garden-sydney

New South Wales Heritage Register
- Official name: Royal Botanic Gardens and Domain; Tarpeian Way; Botanical Gardens
- Type: State heritage (landscape)
- Designated: 2 April 1999
- Reference no.: 1070
- Type: Garden Botanic
- Category: Parks, Gardens and Trees
- Builders: Charles Fraser; Allan Cunningham; Richard Cunningham; Charles Moore; Joseph Maiden; Carrick Chambers

The Royal Botanic Garden is a heritage-listed major 30-hectare (74-acre) botanical garden in Sydney, New South Wales, Australia, event venue and public recreation area located at Farm Cove on the eastern fringe of the Sydney central business district, in the City of Sydney local government area of New South Wales, Australia.

Opened in 1816, the garden is the oldest scientific institution in Australia and one of the most important historic botanical institutions in the world. The overall structure and key elements were designed by Charles Moore and Joseph Maiden, and various other elements designed and built under the supervision of Allan Cunningham, Richard Cunningham, and Carrick Chambers. The garden is owned by the Government of New South Wales and administered by the Royal Botanic Gardens and Domain Trust. The Botanic Garden, together with the adjacent Domain were added to the New South Wales State Heritage Register on 2 April 1999.

The Garden and The Domain are open every day of the year and access is free. Its position on Sydney Harbour, the Sydney Opera House and the large public parklands of The Domain ensure it is one of the most visited attractions in Sydney. The garden is bordered by the Cahill Expressway to the south and west, Macquarie Street to the northwest, Art Gallery Road to the east, and Sydney Harbour to the north.

== Establishment and development ==
The first farm by European settlers on the Australian continent, at Farm Cove, was established in 1788 by Governor Arthur Phillip. Although that farm failed, the land has been in constant cultivation since that time, as ways were found to make the relatively infertile soils more productive. The Botanic Garden was founded on this site by Governor Macquarie in 1816 as part of the Governor's Domain. Australia's long history of collection and study of plants began with the appointment of the first Colonial Botanist, Charles Fraser, in 1817. The Botanic Gardens is the oldest scientific institution in Australia and, from the earliest days, has played a major role in the acclimatisation of plants from other regions. After a succession of colonial botanists and superintendents, including the brothers Richard and Allan Cunningham, both also early explorers, John Carne Bidwill was appointed as the first Director in 1847. Charles Moore was possibly the most influential Director, with his responsibility spanning 48 years, from 1848 to 1896. Moore was succeeded by Joseph Maiden who added much to Moore's maturing landscape, and served for a period of 28 years.

=== Early colonial development (1821–1847) ===
Charles Fraser, Superintendent 1821–1831, was the first botanist appointed to develop the gardens along scientific lines. Fraser made many inland excursions particularly with John Oxley and brought back plants and specimens. Fraser's plantings between 1827 and 1828 from his Brisbane district and northern NSW travels survive, and include hoop pines (Araucaria cunninghamii), weeping lilly pillies (Waterhousea floribunda), a hoop (or Moreton Bay) pine (Araucaria cunninghamii), two swamp oaks (Casuarina cunninghamiana) on the eastern side of the palm grove. On his death in 1831 he was succeeded by Richard Cunningham. His brother, the explorer Allan Cunningham was also a director. A native red cedar Fraser collected in 1822 formerly thought to have been from the Parramatta region has been genetically tested and found to have been collected in the Dorrigo region. This tree grows still near the Palm House (beside Farm Cove Creek in Bed 9).

In 1825 Governor Brisbane directed that the Garden extend west of Farm Cove Creek, for an experimental garden, to acclimatise Australian plants for export and imported plants. Between 1829 and 1838 the wine growing industry of New South Wales began in the Garden with some vines being brought out with the First Fleet (1788), and a large supplementary collection of around 365 vine cultivars donated by James Busby in 1832 (planted early 1833). Busby in fact imported cuttings of over 540 vines, but all those of at least 170 of the accessions were either dead on arrival at Sydney or did not survive through to mid-1834. For three or four years, vines propagated from these plants were distributed throughout the colony, but the collection increasingly fell into neglect and was in a parlous state well before 1840, with very many vines dead and many of the remainder unidentifiable due to the loss of their labels and inadequate record keeping. In the 1830s the Lower Garden area at the head of Farm Cove was developed and the shoreline laid out in an ornamental fashion with serpentine paths. In 1833 four gardens were recognised: the botanic garden (the lower garden at the head of the cove); the fruit garden; the experimental garden and the kitchen garden, still producing food for the Governor's table. Between 1837 and 1845 the (New) Government House was built in The Domain's north (north of the current extent of the Botanic Garden). In 1847 the fig tree avenue of Moreton Bay figs (Ficus macrophylla) was planted, lining main public entry to gardens from Macquarie Street eastward (now the line of the Cahill Expressway).

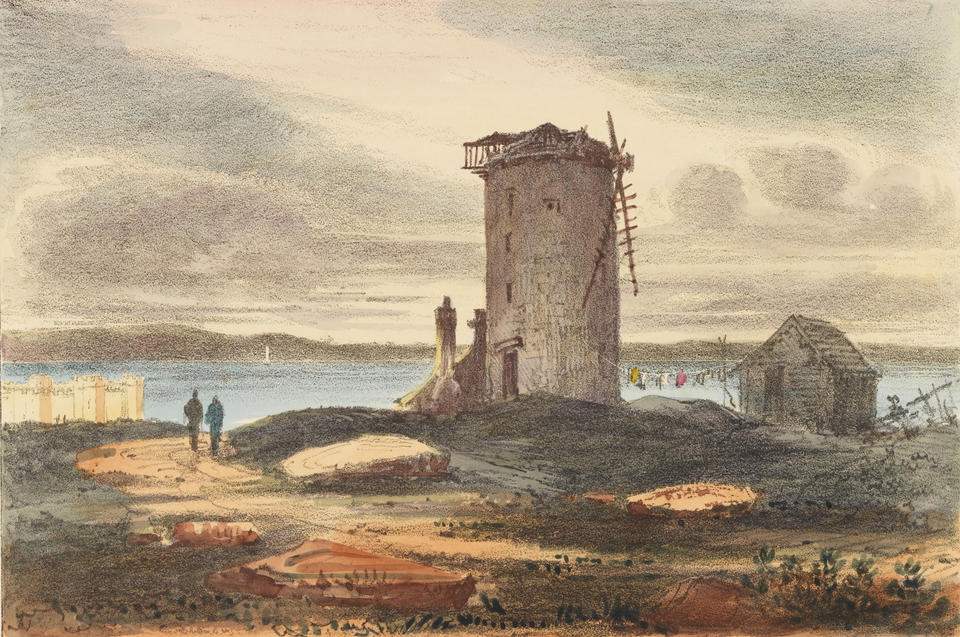
Old Windmill. Government Domain, 1836, lithograph, J.G. Austin

The East India Company windmill stood in The Domain near Government House stables. It was located close to the statue of a huntsman with dogs by Henri Alfred Jacquemart, which is still in the grounds of the Royal Botanical Garden. Built of stone, it was owned by the Government and was used for grinding the grain of the settlers. According to Freeman's Journal, the windmill was built by the East India Company who were granted land around Farm Cove. The Governor of New South Wales later took forcible possession of the mill which resulted in a drawn-out lawsuit between the company and the government. During the dispute the Collector of Internal Revenue, Mr Wm. McPherson hired a manager to live in the cottages next to the mill. At this time, where the Bent-street entrance now is, was occupied as a large dairy, kept by Mr W. Stone. There was a large gate near the dairy; it stood a bit in from Bent-street, and faced Macquarie-street, with two large Norfolk Island pines on either side. This was the entrance to the company's mill, but it could not be called a public entrance in the accepted meaning, it being on private property. Finally, in 1835 Sir Richard Bourke had the mill taken down and removed.

=== Expansion under Charles Moore (1848–1896) ===
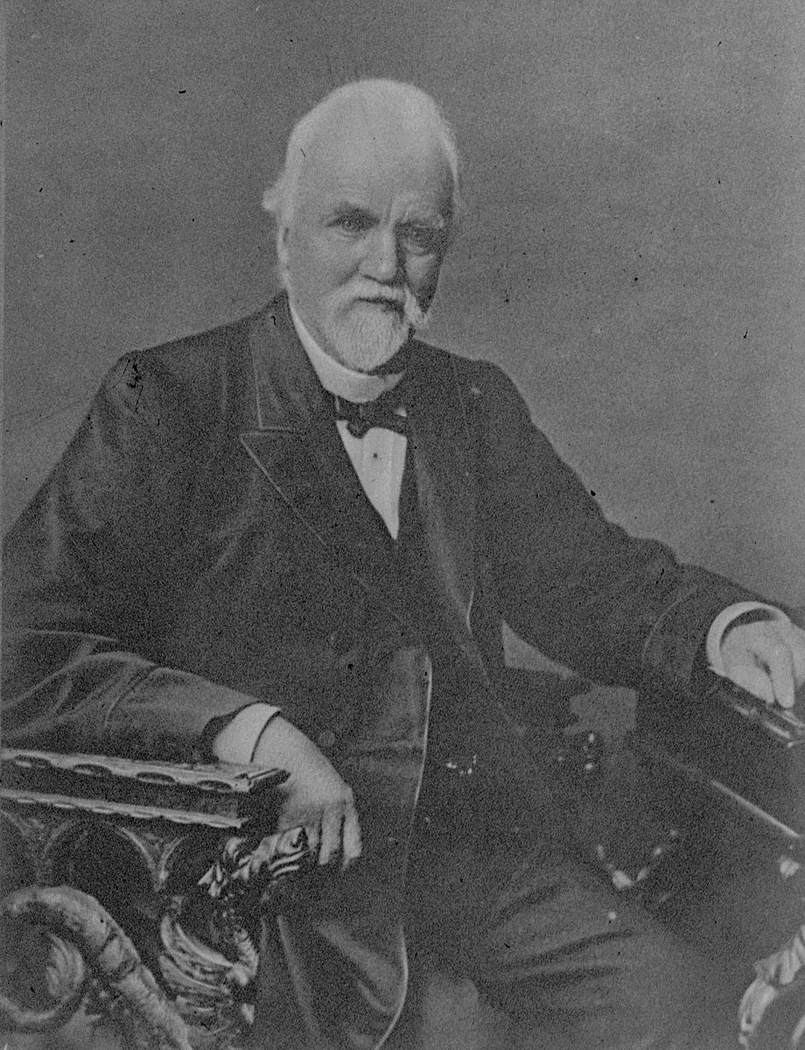
Charles Moore

In 1848 John Carne Bidwill was appointed (the first such title) Director, by Governor Fitzroy. Meantime in England horticulturist Charles Moore (1820–1905) was appointed Director by the English Government. Bidwell was succeeded the following year by Moore. Bidwill was offered the post of Commissioner of Lands, Wide Bay. Moore was a Scotsman who had trained in the Botanic Gardens of Trinity College Dublin. Moore remained Director for 48 years (1848–96) and did much to develop the Botanic Gardens in their modern form. He boldly tackled the problems of poor soil, inadequate water and shortage of funds to develop much of the Gardens as we see them today. The Palm Grove at the heart of the Garden is a reminder of his skill and foresight, as is the reclaimed land behind the Farm Cove seawall which significantly expanded the area of the Garden. Moore renovated paths throughout the upper gardens, built new paths in lower garden and added 1.2 hectares (3 acres) were added to the lower gardens between 1848 and 1858. Between 1848 and 1879 Moore organised construction of the sea wall and reclamation of Farm Cove's tidal flats (work proceeded in two stages) to expand the Lower Garden, the wall being built of stone recycled from demolished Old Government House in Bridge Street, and a long walk was established along Farm Cove. Ornamental ponds in the lower garden were laid out using Farm Cove creek, water supply for upper gardens was aided by water pipe installed from Macquarie Street.

Other work completed under Moore's extensive tenure included:

- 1850s – vista pavilions added in gardens, one with a thatched roof;
- 1852 – the Sydney-based herbarium collection started;
- 1857 – a small portion of the Governor's kitchen garden (Upper Garden) was converted as part of the Botanic Garden;
- 1860 – an aviary opened (site of current succulent/cacti garden) after public lobbying;
- 1860 – the original grape vines were uprooted;
- 1862 – the Palm grove was established near the Middle Garden, summer houses built in gardens. A zoo was added to aviary area. The zoo was Sydney's first and operated in the Gardens from 1862 until 1883, when most of it was transferred to Moore Park. During these years much of the remnant natural vegetation of the surrounding Domain was removed and planted as parkland. The Moreton Bay figs, one of the major elements of this planting, continue to dominate the landscape. In the same year there was considerable plantings of NSW/Queensland rainforest tree species, and palms;
- 1863 – cottage built near Governor's Bathing house for Government House gardener;
- c. 1865 – The Domain gate lodge and gates built, (Hospital Road, Prince Albert Road), Victoria Lodge gate house and gates was built (first stage) at east of Gardens near Mrs Macquarie's Point
- Late 1860s – main part of Governor's kitchen garden (Upper garden) given up as an addition to the Upper Garden;
- 1870 – Governor's private gates built (now Opera House gates);
- 1870s – demolished the convict barracks built in Cunningham's time, and old glasshouses in former Governor's kitchen garden to make open grassed areas of Upper Garden;
- 1871 – 2 hectares (5 acres) of the former Governor's kitchen garden was converted to Botanic Gardens, used as a nursery and propagating ground;
- 1873 – main entry gates built, off Fig Tree Avenue (east of Bent Street, now Cahill Expressway);
- 1874 – Italianate style two-storey Superintendent/Director's residence (now the Cunningham building) with tower was built, near Woolloomooloo gates);
- 1876 – Palm house glasshouse built in Middle Garden; and
- 1878 – single storey herbarium and overseer's residence built.

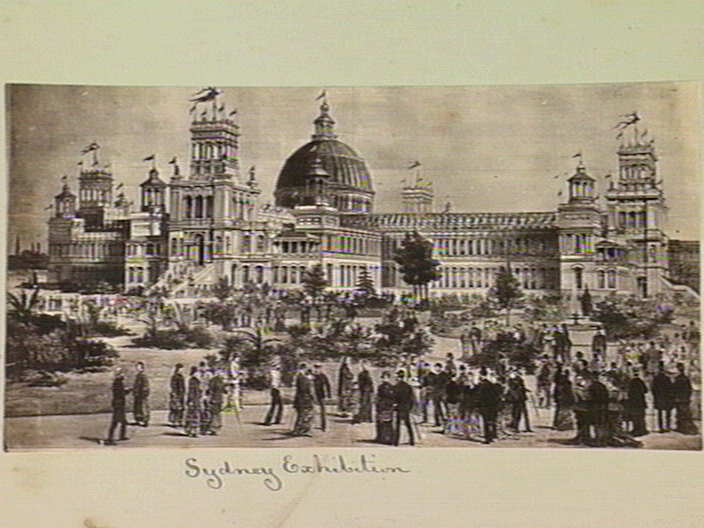
The International Exhibition of 1879 at the Garden Palace

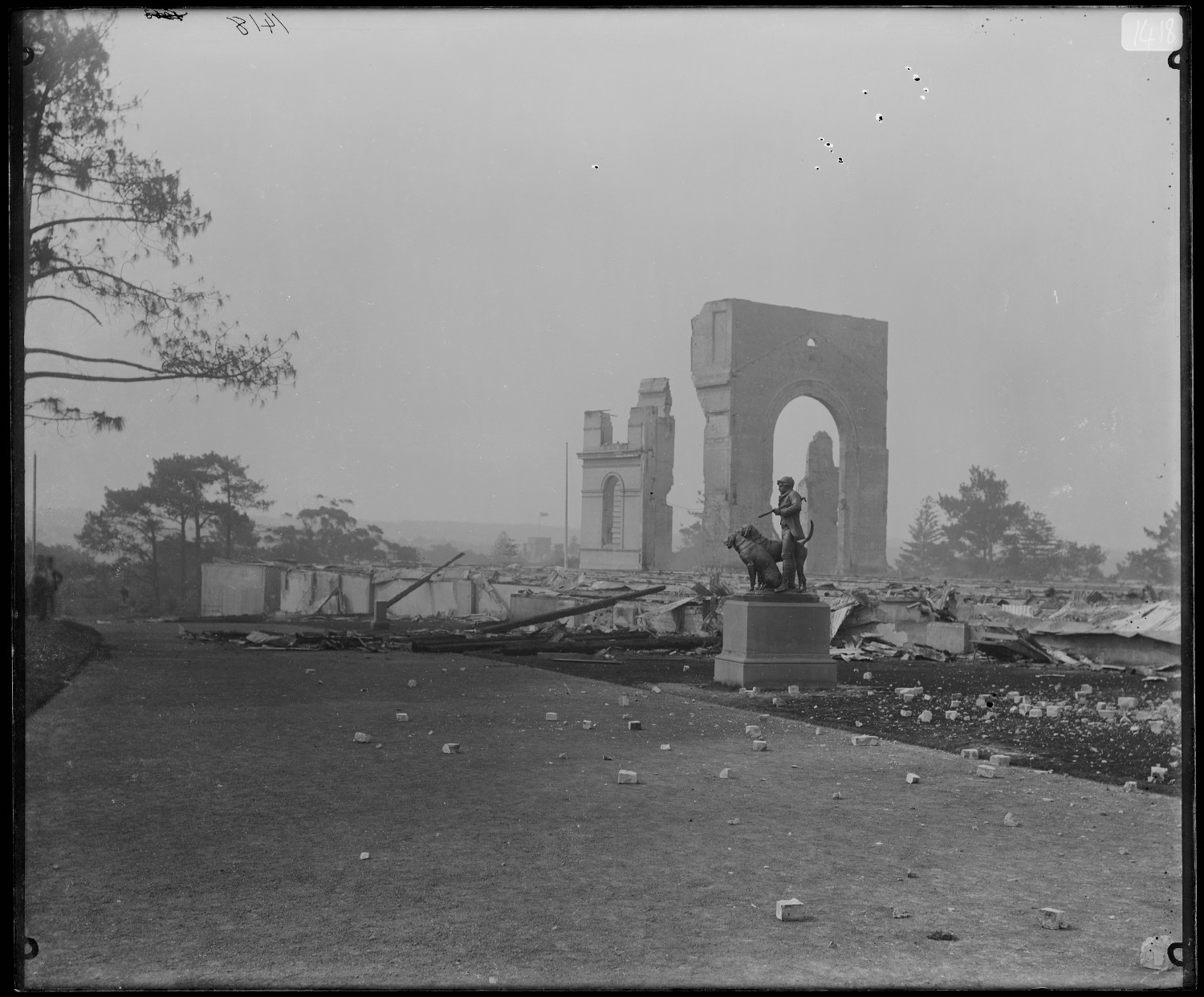
After the fire – The Garden Palace

The Garden Exhibition Palace was built on land between the Government House stables (now the Conservatorium of Music) and Governor Bourke's statue, an area until then used for grazing. The Palace was built to a design by Government Architect James Barnet for the first Australian International Exhibition. It was the epitome of the High Victorian style, complemented by the surroundings new gardens. Its giant dome was 30 metres (100 ft) in diameter surmounted by a lantern 200 feet (61 m) above the ground'. Under the dome was a statue of Queen Victoria; there were four corner towers, and a floor area of over 3 hectares (8.5 acres), making it a major landmark in the city landscape. he International Exhibition held in the Palace attracted over one million visitors, displaying products of the arts and industry, museum collections from the library of the Linnean Society (botany and natural sciences), and 0.4 hectares (0.99 acres) exhibition of specimen displays from the Museums Collection of the Technological, Industrial and Sanitary Museum of NSW, (organised by its then Curator, Joseph Maiden) (the museum eventually became the Museum of Applied Sciences later the Powerhouse Museum), and its surrounding "instant" gardens of lawns, bedding and shrubberies around it, near Macquarie Street/Bent Street. However, the building was destroyed by fire in 1882. After the clean up 8 hectares (19 acres) of new gardens were added to the RBG "Palace Garden"). Joseph Maiden moved and displayed the remnants of the exhibition fire to a pavilion in The Domain which became the official museum, incorporating a herbarium.

In 1880 a monkey house was built as part of the zoo. The same year, Tarpeian Way, including a stone stairway of 53 steps, was cut out of the rocky escarpment north of Bennelong Point, forming a south east boundary to the gardens. From The Sydney Morning Herald, 4 October 1880:

'Originally the Tarpeian Way was that rocky point near the fort on which the citizens were wont to assemble to witness regattas. The point is one which commands a view as extensive as that obtainable from Mrs. Macquarie's chair. The ruggedness of the rocks has succumbed to the artisan's skill, and instead of the rough boulders which used to exist, the rock presents a smooth face, about thirty-five feet in height, and several hundred foot in length, and a well graduated sweep from Messrs. Flood's stores, in Macquarie Street, to within a short distance of the Garden gates. On the top also, the rocks have been faced for an equal length, and formed into what is called the Tarpeian Way; and the stone from here, and also from the side, has been utilised in forming the substantial sea-wall being extended round the Gardens to the Chair. So that here there has been a double attempt to beautify nature. On coming from the Gardens one reaches the Tarpeian Way through pillars of beautifully-toned stone and by ascending fifty-three well formed wide stone steps. The Way itself may be regarded as the highest level pathway of the street, and precautions have, by the erection of a dwarf wall and iron railing, been taken to prevent people falling over the rock. By-and-bye the Way, which at present is simply gravelled, and has a watercourse along it, will be asphalted; and the face of the rock Mr. C. Moore intends shall be beautified with creepers in a manner similar to that adopted in the Argyle Cut. The citizens have been relieved of nearly all expense in connection with the matter, the whole work having been effected by the Government. All the citizens have had to pay for is the inscription of the name on the pillars at the two entrances. Eventually, we are informed, the way will be widened by the annexation of a small point of ground, which at present is enclosed by a fence, although for all purposes of foot traffic it is sufficiently wide already. This, then is, the work which now forms such an imposing feature in the approach to the Gardens.

'Its history is as follows : When Mr. J. S. Farnell, the present member for St. Leonards, first assumed the position of Minister for Lands, he was induced by Alderman C. Moore to visit the locality in which it is situated, and to inspect the plans which Mr. E. Bradridge, the late City Surveyor, had prepared for carrying it out. Mr. Moriarty, the Engineer for Harbours and Rivers, under whose direction the work has been executed, was also present. Mr. Farnell seems to have been deeply impressed with the necessity for the work, and a sum of 6000 pounds was placed on the Estimates for carrying it on. Objections were at first raised against the width of the way being taken from the Government House grounds; but after some deliberation, and when it was explained that it would be only utilised by pedestrians, they were waived, and the work was permitted to proceed. The classic name chosen by Mr. Alderman Moore, and sanctioned by the Sydney Municipal Council, seems to have been impressed on Mr. Moore's mind, when, during his visit to Rome, a few years ago, he stood upon the Tarpeian Rock itself.

'Tarpeia was the daughter of Tarpeius the governor of the Roman citadel of the Saturnian Hill, afterwards called the Capitoline. She was tempted by the gold of the Sabine bracelets and collars to open a gate of the fortress to Tatius and his Sabines. As these entered they threw upon her their shields, and thus crushed her to death. She was buried on the hill, and her memory was preserved by naming the rock after her. A legend still exists in Rome to the effect that the fair Tarpeia ever sits in the heart of the hill, covered with gold and jewels, and bound by a spell.

In "Coriolanus" Shakespeare refers more than once to the rock. Brutus says, "Marcius is worthy of present death," lo which his brother tribune Sicinius Velutus replies, "Therefore, lay hold of him; bear him to the rock Tarpeian, and from thence into destruction cast him;" and further on "He shall be thrown from the Tarpeian Rock with rigorous hands." Coriolanus himself indomitably says, "Or pile ten hills upon the Tarpeian Rock that the precipitation might down stretch below the beam of sight; yet will I still be thus to them." Judging from these and other passages the ancient Romans had a liking, which is now happily out date, for pronouncing "the steep Tarpeian death." Lord Macaulay also refers to the same classical ground.

— The Sydney Morning Herald, 4 October 1880

Scottish gardener Alexander Grant was born in 1845 at Cullen, Scotland and served an apprenticeship in the gardens of Cullen House in Banffshire. Before migrating to Australia in 1878 he followed his profession in several Scottish gardens, including the Botanic Gardens in Edinburgh. Grant arrived in the colony in 1878 and worked first at Yaralla, Concord for the Walkers for some considerable time, then at Rosemont, Woollahra for Alexander Campbell MLC, then for Mr Tooth at the Swifts, Darling Point, which he planned and laid out. There is no record of where Grant was living while working at Yaralla and Rosemont, though from 1881 he lived at Willow Cottage in Point Piper Road – west side (later Ocean Street), Paddington until he moved to quarters in the Botanic Garden, Sydney in 1882 for work there. It is likely that the positions at Yaralla and Rosemont both included quarters for a single man and that only after he married Margaret Stevenson in January 1880 was he obliged to find alternative accommodation (Willow Cottage).

Towards the end of his time as Director, Moore, together with Ernst Betche, published the Handbook of the Flora of New South Wales, further establishing the Botanic Garden as a centre for the science of botany.

From 1882 on Director Joseph Maiden added lighting (e.g.: on the sea walk on Farm Cove), seating, lavatories, drinking fountains and pathways. In 1883 the zoo was relocated to Moore Park; and 2 hectares (5 acres) of Outer Domain were incorporated into the Lower Garden, completing the ring of waterfront along Farm Cove. During the 1880s the Tarpeian Rock was a prominent, dramatic and significant sandstone cliff landscape feature on the north west boundary of the Domain facing Bennelong Point and the Sydney Opera House, cut for the extension of Macquarie Street. The Rock derives its name from the famous Tarpeian Rock on the Capitoline Hill in Rome from where prisoners were hurled to their deaths in ancient times. A stairway gives access from close to the Sydney Opera House to the top of the rock and The Domain. An early carving in the sandstone cliff is located about 3 metres (9.8 ft) above the fifth step from the base of the cliff. The carving reads "The Tarpeian Way." It possibly dates from the time of construction in the 1880s.

Between 1896 and 1901 Director Maiden installed new lighting, seating, lavatories, fountains and pathways. Lighting along the sea walk and the lower garden installed, making the ring of water front of the lower gardens complete. In 1897 the Governor Phillip fountain was built near Macquarie Street/Garden palace gates. In 1899 a new herbarium building (second storey added by Govt. Architect Vernon to existing building, ground floor adapted as lecture hall and library, museum and admin centre) was built; now the Anderson Building.

=== Developments in the twentieth century ===
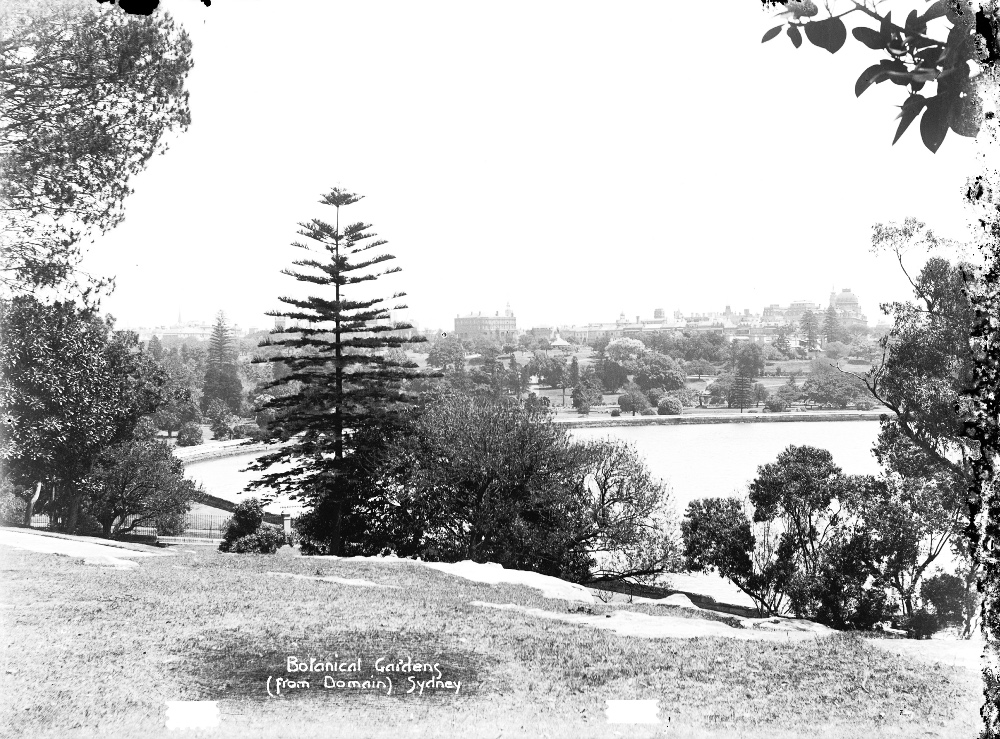
Royal Botanic Garden c. 1908 (Source: State Library of NSW)

Moore was succeeded by Joseph Henry Maiden who, during his 28-year term, added much to Moore's maturing landscape. He organised the construction of a new herbarium building, opened in 1901 (today part of the Anderson Building), and made major improvements to The Domain. However, the Botanic Garden suffered from loss of staff positions during the World War I, and in the Great Depression of the 1930s, the position of Director was lost. Both the Herbarium and the living collections languished.

In 1901 Maiden had an obelisk erected in a central pond, housing the relocated remains of Allan Cunningham from the Devonshire Street Cemetery. Maiden also drained and sewered the gardens. Between 1908 and 1916 the Sydney Conservatorium of Music was created by adapting the former Governor's Stables in the Western Domain. In 1912 the Palm House new superstructure was completed, designed by Government Architect George McRae. By 1916 there were 72.6 hectares (179 acres) of space with the Botanic Garden and The Domain. In 1926 the Spring walk was replanted.

In 1936, on the site of the former aviaries/zoo, in the eastern section of the Garden, a succulent garden was created, near the Herbarium. In 1938 the Pioneer Memorial Women's' Garden opened, laid out in sunken circular area under the centre of the former (1879–1882) Garden Palace dome. Laid out by Andersons & Co. of Sydney. In 1940 the aviary was removed.

From 1958 until the 1960s the Cahill Expressway was extended, bisecting The Domain and the Botanic Garden, partly destroying Fig Tree Avenue (first entrance, planted 1847) and loss of 24 palm trees and 12 other trees lost. A new Garden entrance was made on Macquarie Street with pools and prostrate plants, and recycled sandstone and iron gates from the post-Garden Palace fire. This entrance leads to the Palace Gardens. The Botanic Garden and The Domain were sewered for the first time since 1792. From 1945 Robert Anderson worked to reunify the Herbarium and Botanic Garden. In 1959 the title 'Royal' was granted, following the landing of Queen Elizabeth II in Farm Cove, this being the first site in Australia on which a reigning monarch had stood.

As Director, Knowles Mair (1965–1970) achieved reunification and the Royal Botanic Garden began its return to eminence. In 1968 the Herbarium was combined with the Royal Botanic Garden. From 1969 further reconstruction and planting after completion of Cahill Expressway and The Domain Parking station. Australian and New Zealand native plants were extensively used, in the plantings near the Bent Street/Macquarie Street entrance (opposite the State Library) and Woolloomooloo gates near Mrs Macquarie's Road. Many glasshouses were removed in the 1970s under Director Mair, and the new Pyramid Glasshouse, built in 1970–71, designed by Ancher, Mortlock & Murray. The first of its kind in the world, it contained a spiral staircase to allow visitors to observe all levels of tropical plant growth within.

In 1972–1985, Dr Lawrence Johnson, Director, proposed the "thematic" planting scheme in evidence today. NSW and Queensland rainforest trees collected by Fraser, Allan and Richard Cunningham, and Charles Moore scattered throughout the Garden were supplemented by a new section of tropical and subtropical rainforest flora near the Pyramid glasshouse. The palm collection, which is planted in three separate groves in the Garden, was thinned of duplicate species, particularly in Moore's original palm grove, and new species were added. The fig (Ficus) collection, mainly in the lower garden, was rationalised and centred on the slope below Government House, with many additional species added. A garden bed of local native species was added near the Cunningham building in the Upper garden, and the long bed of native small trees and shrubs along the boundary of the gardens on Macquarie Street was thickened with new plantings. A collection of eucalypts on the lawns of the Lower Garden north of the Macquarie Wall was under planted with a new collection of cycads, many relocated from the original Moore Palm Grove. A Myrtales bed near the Twin ponds in the Lower Garden was added.

Directors Dr John Beard (1970–1972) and Dr Lawrence Johnson (1972–1985) further developed the organisation. The breadth of activities increased over these decades with the formation of the Friends of the Royal Botanic Garden; educational and ecological programs; the Flora of New South Wales; the scientific journals Telopea and Cunninghamia and programs of computerised documentation of both the living and herbarium collections.

Between 1970 and 1980 the new succulent and cacti garden was built on the site of the former aviary/zoo near Mrs Macquarie's Road in the east. In 1978 the administration of the Botanic Garden and National Herbarium of NSW were transferred from the Department of Agriculture (where they had been administered since 1908) to the Premier's Department. In 1972, a carpark for the Sydney Opera House was not built after the Builders Labourers Federation placed a green ban on the site.

In 1980 the Royal Botanic Gardens Trust Act was passed by Parliament, seeking to prevent further erosion of the grounds and excisions of land (the 72.6 hectares (179 acres) in 1916 had diminished to 63.04 hectares (155.8 acres) in 1980). Also in 1980 Centennial Park, which until then had been administered by staff of the Botanic Gardens since Moore's directorship, became autonomous under its own Trust.

In 1982 the new Herbarium building was built under Director Johnson opened (named the Brown building in honour of colonial botanist Robert Brown), linking the former Herbarium (now called the Maiden Theatre and Moore Room) building and the 1870s former Superintendent/Director's residence. The former Herbarium was adapted to a visitors' centre, shop and exhibitions space (now the Moore Room, within the then renamed R. H. Anderson Building), and the former Director's residence, named now the Cunningham building, was adapted for office use by staff. The complex was opened on 6 November 1982 by then Premier Neville Wran, QC MP. The Brown building had three levels housing the herbarium collection in 55,000 specially designed red plastic boxes, plus scientific staff offices, a laboratory, scanning electron microscope and full drying room and library. In July 1982 a general meeting established the Friends of the Botanic Gardens and members' events (to raise funds for the Botanic Garden) commenced in December 1982.

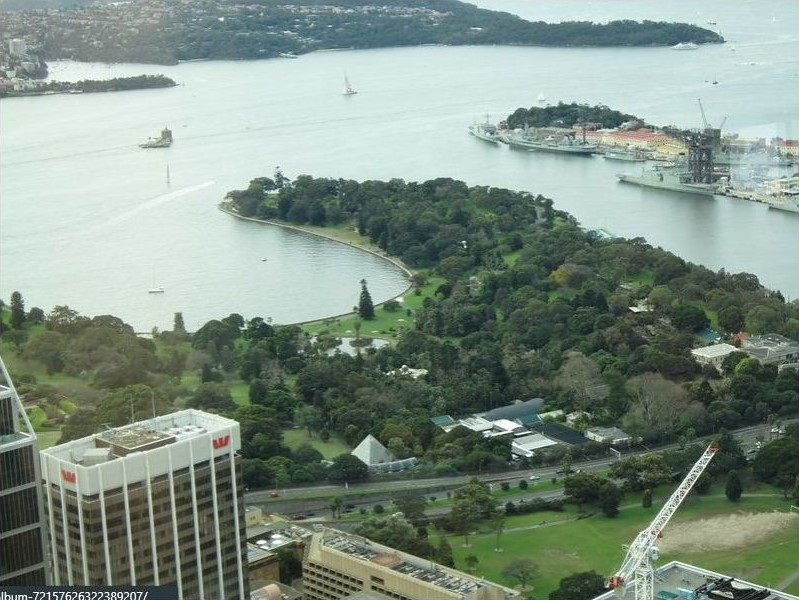
The Gardens with the Pyramid glasshouse bottom centre, 2011

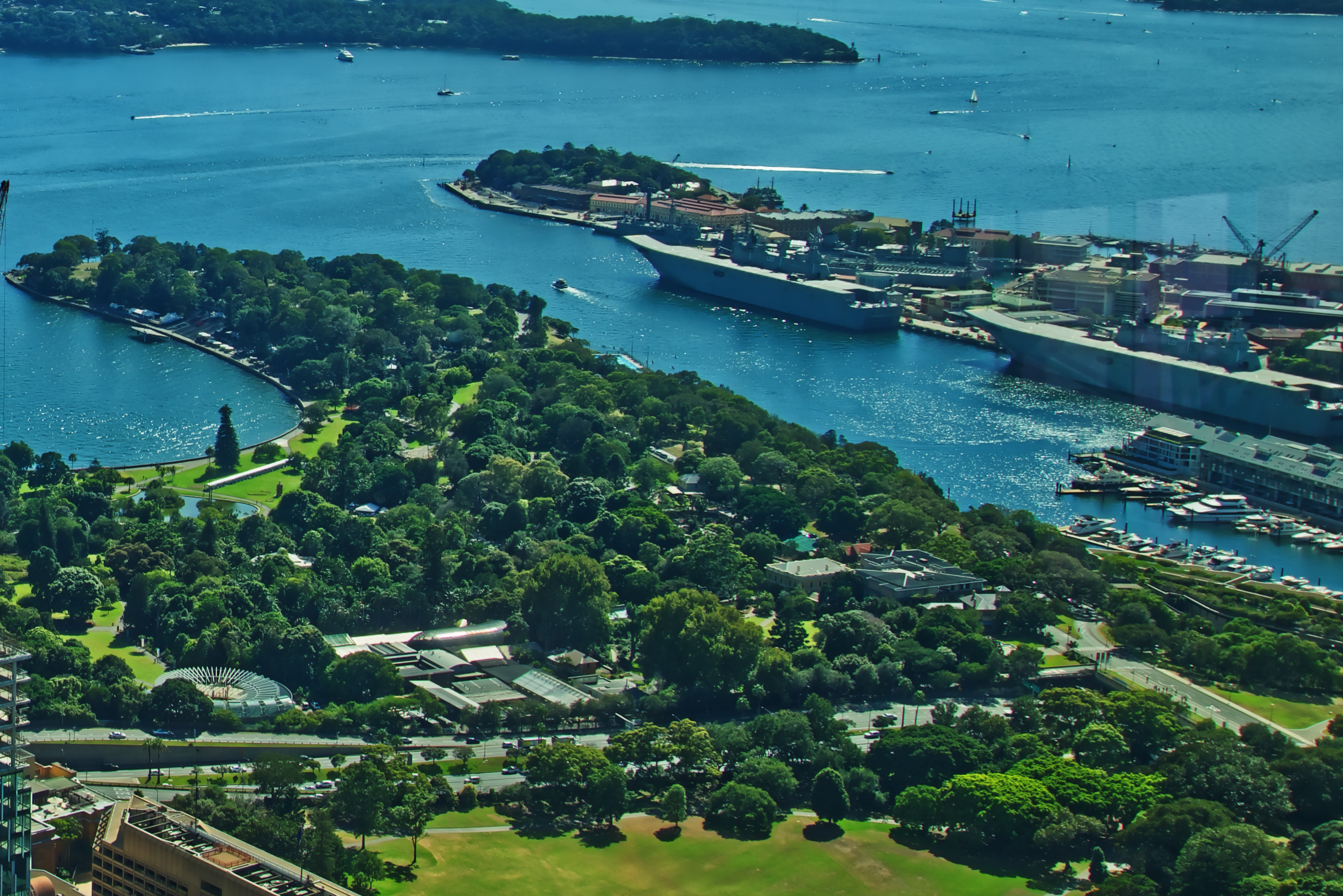
The Gardens with the Calyx bottom left, 2019

In 1987 and 1988 under Director Carrick Chambers, two satellite botanic gardens areas were opened, Mt. Annan (subsequently renamed the Australian Botanic Garden Mount Annan on Narellan Road near Campbelltown featuring native plants, and Mount Tomah (subsequently renamed the Blue Mountains Botanic Garden on the Bells Line of Road in the northern Blue Mountains, featuring cool-climate plants. Both were formally opened in 1988 as part of Australia's Bicentennial celebrations. During 1988 and 1989 a new rose garden was built near the Bridge Street gates (since removed). A new curved "Arc" glasshouse was built adjoining (east of) the Pyramid glasshouse, which was intended for ferns. It has since been adapted for tropical plants. In 2015 the Pyramid was demolished to make way for "Calyx" the new display and tropical plant centre. The curved "Arc" glasshouse is being adapted as part of the same works. The Royal Botanic Gardens celebrated its 175th anniversary in 1991. During Professor Chambers' ten years as Director, the Rose Garden (1988), the Fernery (1993), the Herb Garden (1994), and the Oriental Garden (1997) were opened and the Rare and Threatened Species Garden (1998) was commenced to further enrich the experience of visitors. The Royal Botanic Garden Foundation was established to seek a wider range of support for future needs.

During the 1990s Asian themed plants garden added in Lower Garden below kiosk and east of Twin ponds. A new fernery designed by John Barbeceto was built in the Middle Gardens (on the site of two former shade houses) adjoining the gardens nursery area and palm grove. A new herb garden was built in the western side of the Lower gardens below the Conservatorium. Considerable upgrade works were undertaken in the run up to the 2000 Sydney Olympic Games, including adaptation of existing buildings for new central shop and toilets. The Cadi Jam Ora – First Fleet Encounters garden was created north of the Palm House in the Middle Garden area. John Lennis (1952–2015) as Aboriginal Education Officer was responsible for the content, "flavour" and involvement of Aboriginal people in this garden. During 1992 and 19933 the Palm House glasshouse was reconstructed to its 1912 form and adapted to become an exhibition space. About 50% of its original glazing was recycled on the south side, also c. 1920s patterned glass was reused. In the mid-1990s a fourth level was added to the Robert Brown building (National Herbarium), providing more work spaces and shelving for 20,000 more red herbarium boxes and a sloping roof to stop leaks.

From 1996 to 1998 the Rare & Endangered Garden, was laid out north of the Herbarium, growing and displaying plants under threat in the wild or out-of-fashion in cultivation. Jeremy Coleby-Williams was instrumental in establishing this. Also in 1997–98 the HSBS Oriental Garden was established west of the lotus pond in the middle garden. Its site has Asian associations dating from 1917. In 1998 the Wollemi pine (Wollemia nobilis) was discovered in a remote gorge in Wollemi National Park by Phillip Noble, triggering an innovative propagation campaign to secure this species in ex-situ cultivation. An early specimen was planted on the site of the main intersection of paths between the middle garden, Cadi Jam Ora – First Encounters and the Rare and Endangered Gardens.

=== Developments in the twenty-first century ===
In 2000 the toilet block in the Palm Grove was adapted and extended to become the Garden Shop, renamed the Palm Grove Centre. During 2000 to 2001 the Conservatorium of Music was redeveloped with new underground extensions, demolition of trial grass beds and incorporation of new roof garden areas to gardens over the new Conservatorium. A new land bridge was built (completed in 2005) over the Cahill Expressway/Eastern Distributor redevelopment, linking the Art Gallery of NSW, Mrs Macquarie's Road, The Domain and Botanic Garden, with small additional land area and new native plantings to The Domain. In 2003 a Fig tree avenue (Cahill Expressway median) was removed. Originally it was planted in 1847 in the brief directorship of John Carne Bidwill). The rose garden was also removed for redevelopment, the Spring Walk plantings (azaleas, etc.) were removed for fumigation/fallowing of soil.

In 2005 the fourth on-site Rose Garden near the Conservatorium and its adjoining pergolas were altered with additions made to both to allow functions, set up and preparation facilities, and a new amenities block. From 2006 the Cacti and Succulent Garden was partially revamped by Jamie Durie, celebrity horticulturist. The Central Gardens Depot was also redeveloped, with repair of significant heritage glasshouses, new glasshouses, store and staff areas.

From 2011 onwards the relocation of a growing colony of roosting grey-headed flying foxes (bats) in the Palm Grove has resulted in slow renewal of that area. The roosting activities of the bats had caused the death of a number of highly significant trees and previous attempts using noise, sprinklers and lights had proved ineffective in encouraging the animals to move. In Autumn 2014 Palm Grove was restored, with over 1300 palm species being donated by Illawarra businessman and conservationist Colin Wilson, after he saw the damage flying foxes had caused. Efforts to grow this collection will help secure the survival of many very rare species. The Palm Grove was once internationally recognised as one of the best in the world. The goal was to restore it to equal or surpass its past glory and give an opportunity to see a wide range of palms. At their peak some 22,000 grey-headed flying foxes roosted in the Palm Grove and Gardens. The former was their favoured spot. They killed 28 mature trees, 30 palms and many understorey plants. The Royal Botanic Gardens and Domain Trust commenced a successful flying-fox relocation programme in 2012.

In July 2015 the Minister announced organisational changes to transform the Royal Botanic Gardens and Domain Trust into a more efficient and responsive organisation. He revealed the name of the new Biome project will be "The Calyx", which opened in 2016. He also announced a 26% increase in agency budget over 2014–15 estimates.

In 2016 the Royal Botanic Garden celebrated its 200 years anniversary with various events to commemorate key educational, horticultural, scientific and cultural experiences of those two centuries. Fireworks displays ushering in the New Year, significant new exhibitions and collaborations with other cultural institutions.

== Royal Botanic Gardens and Domain Trust ==
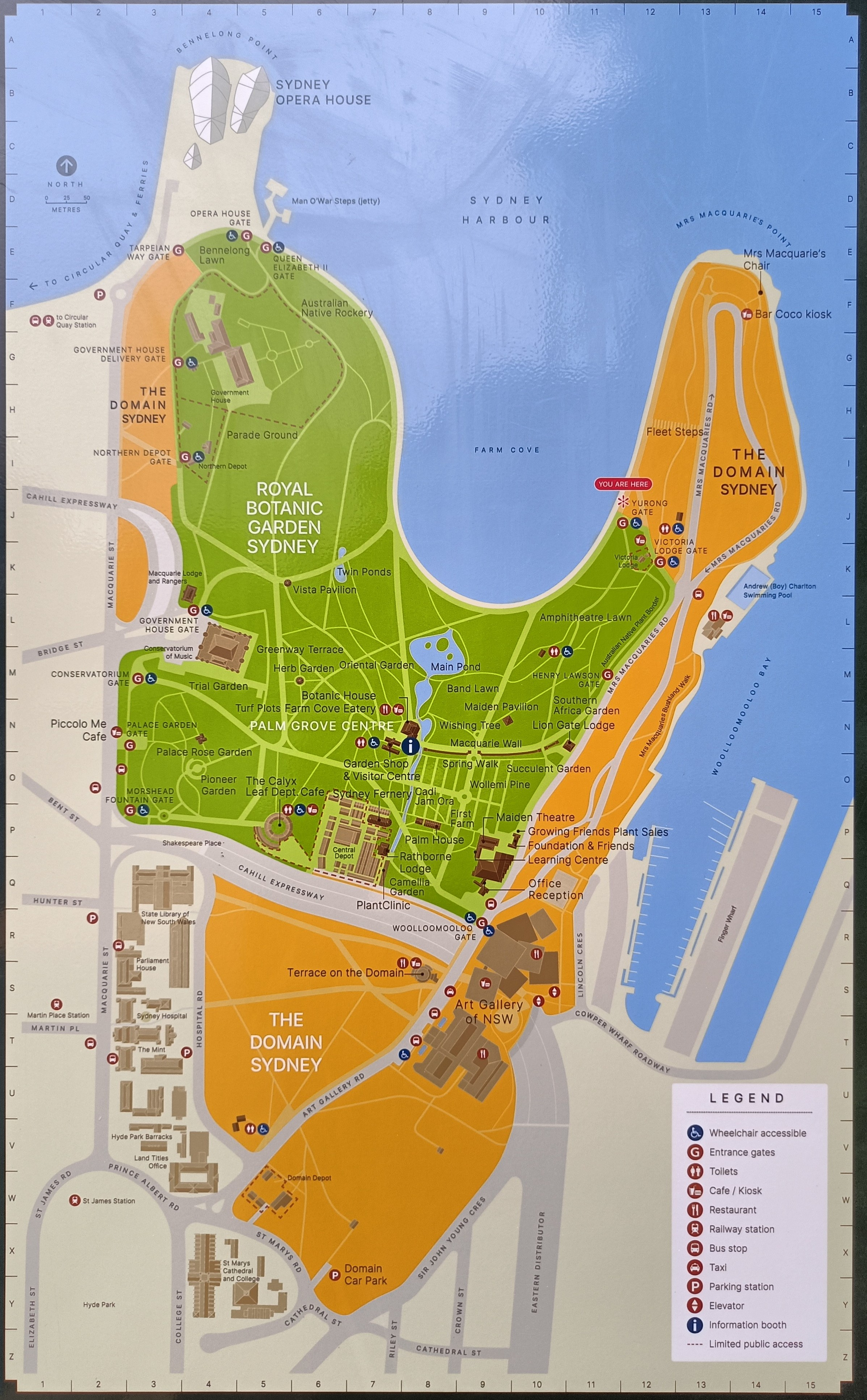
The Gardens and the Domain

The Garden comes under the responsibility of the Royal Botanic Gardens and Domain Trust, established in 1980 by act of the New South Wales Parliament. The Domain Leasing Act 1961 was repealed and An Act to constitute the Royal Botanic Gardens and Domain Trust was passed, defining its powers, authorities, duties and functions. The trust is also responsible for the adjoining public open space of The Domain as well as the Australian Botanic Garden Mount Annan in western Sydney and the Blue Mountains Botanic Garden Mount Tomah in the Blue Mountains. While the Trustees provide oversight of the lands under legislative guidelines, the day-to-day operational management of the Garden is undertaken by staff. In 2014 it was announced that the Royal Botanic Gardens and Domain Trust would be known as the Botanic Gardens & Centennial Parklands, widening responsibilities to take in the heritage-listed Centennial Parklands that includes Centennial, Moore and Queens parks.

== Description ==
The Royal Botanic Garden consist of 29 hectares (72 acres) of closely cultivated land surrounded by 51 hectares (130 acres) of open parklands comprising The Sydney Domain. The Garden forms a large natural amphitheatre, wrapped around and sloping down towards the 'stage' of Farm Cove. It is divided into four major precincts called the Lower Gardens, the Middle Gardens, the Palace Gardens and the Bennelong precinct. Within the four major precincts are many smaller gardens and features as well as large amounts of lightly wooded lawn areas. Located approximately in the middle of the four precincts is the Palm Grove Centre which offers a restaurant, cafe, visitors centre and bookshop. A large and complex public botanic garden, largely of late 19th-century character; being not only an historic site of the first importance but containing within it numerous structures which have been nominated separately by the National Trust of Australia (NSW). A predominantly nineteenth century character of landscape layout strengthened by large mature trees. Traditionally designated as four areas reflecting its development.

The single most distinct landscape feature in the Garden is the historic hand-hewn sandstone seawall that curves around Farm Cove from Mrs Macquarie's Point to the Opera House, delineating the garden from the harbour and providing a focal point for visitors, joggers and photographers.

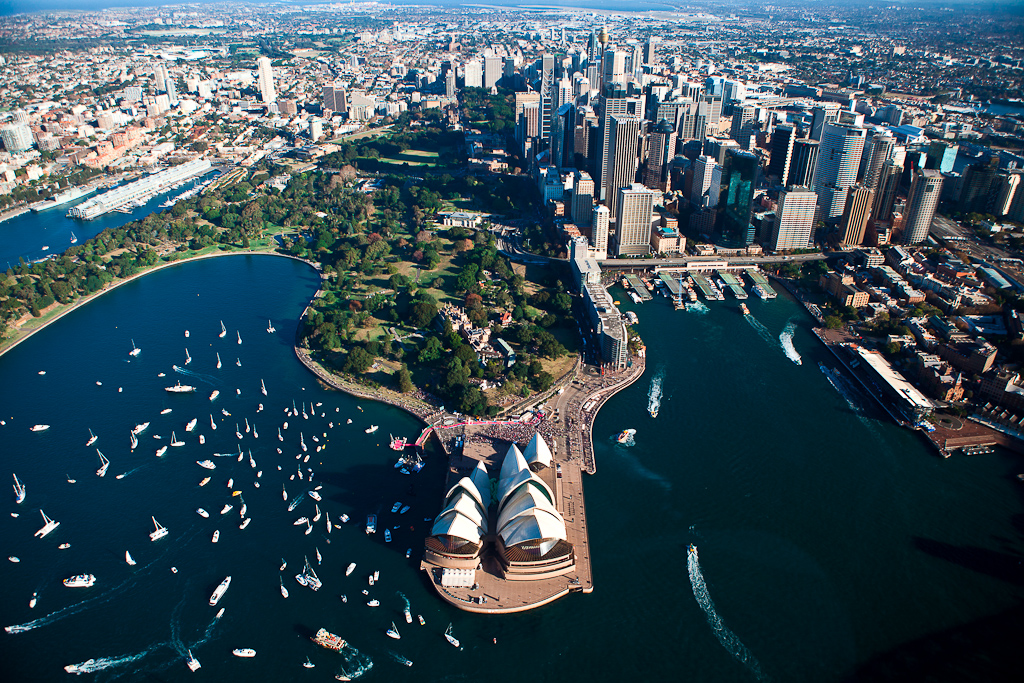
The Garden around and behind Farm Cove

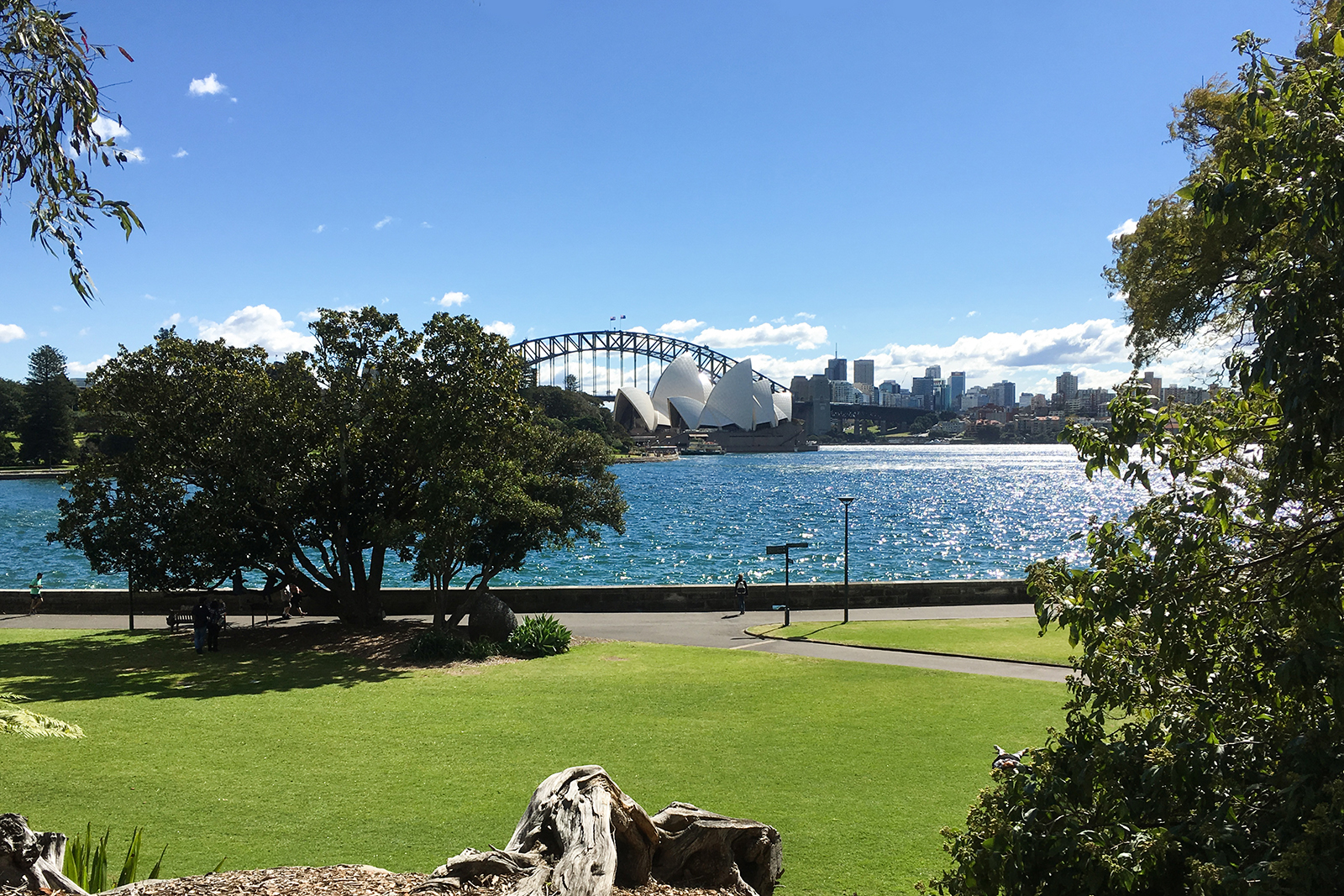
Farm Cove

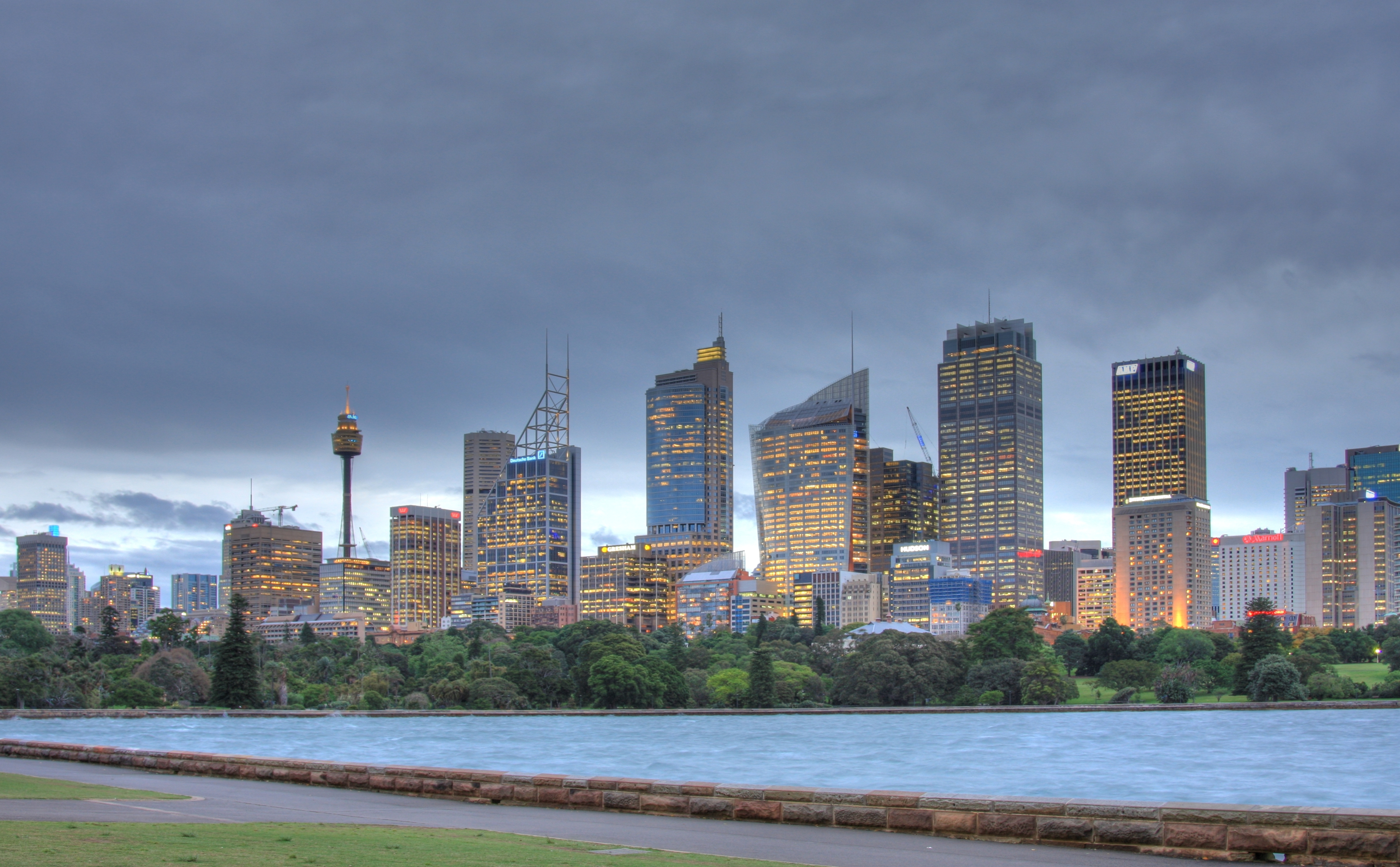
The Garden from Mrs Macquarie's Point

The layout of the Gardens is exceptionally important, each area (the Middle garden, the Lower Garden, the Palace Lawn etc.) reflects an important stage in the development of the Garden and the current fashion in landscape design almost from the founding of the colony. The squared beds of the Middle Garden are traditionally believed to reflect the first furrows and shortly thereafter the first garden plots of the new settlement. The old Garden Palace grounds is the area bordering Macquarie Street and the Conservatorium of Music (former Government House stables). The Middle Garden is the first farm site. The Upper garden comprises the southern section housing administrative offices and National Herbarium on Mrs Macquarie's road as well as the nursery and depot area bordering the Cahill Expressway. The Lower Garden comprises the rest of the area extending north of the Middle Garden to Farm Cove.

The Garden Palace grounds being the highest point have excellent views and are maintained as lawn areas, garden beds, Australian shrubs and turf species. The area was originally enclosed by a paling fence for grazing the Governor's stock. An ornamental fence was constructed along Macquarie Street and in the grounds stood the Garden Palace built 1879 which was destroyed by fire in 1882.

The Middle Garden is now the most closely cultivated section of the gardens where both native and exotic species are well labelled. It included the spring walk famous for its azalea display, one of the finest collections of outdoor palms in the world and a 1970s succulent garden. Some of the Lower Garden was laid out by Charles Fraser and features ponds which are frequented by waterfowl including Australian Black Swans which breed successfully in the environment.

=== Lower Gardens ===
Charles Moore directed the reclamation of and expansion of the "Lower Garden" into Farm Cove, extending the gardens' pleasure grounds with curving pleasure walks, tree and shrubbery plantings. This work took place over 30 years, resulting in a gardenesque parkland which retains much of its original layout and composition today. Within this layout there are collections of plants of note, including from the Canary Islands, New Zealand and the Pacific Islands. The lower gardens feature the Band Lawn, the main Ponds, the HSBC Oriental Garden, the Yurong, Victoria Lodge, Henry Lawson Gates and the Maiden Pavilion.

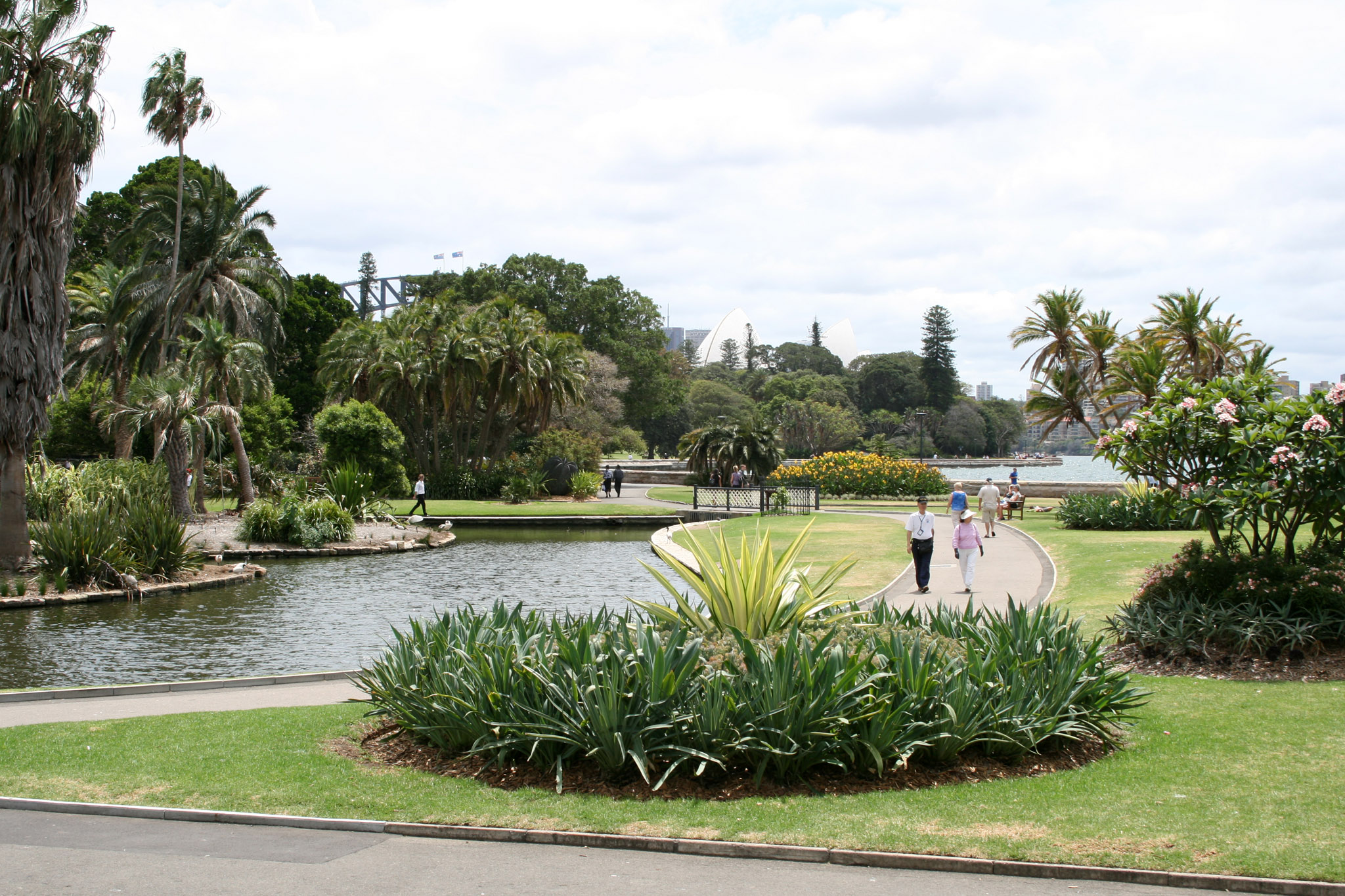
The lower gardens

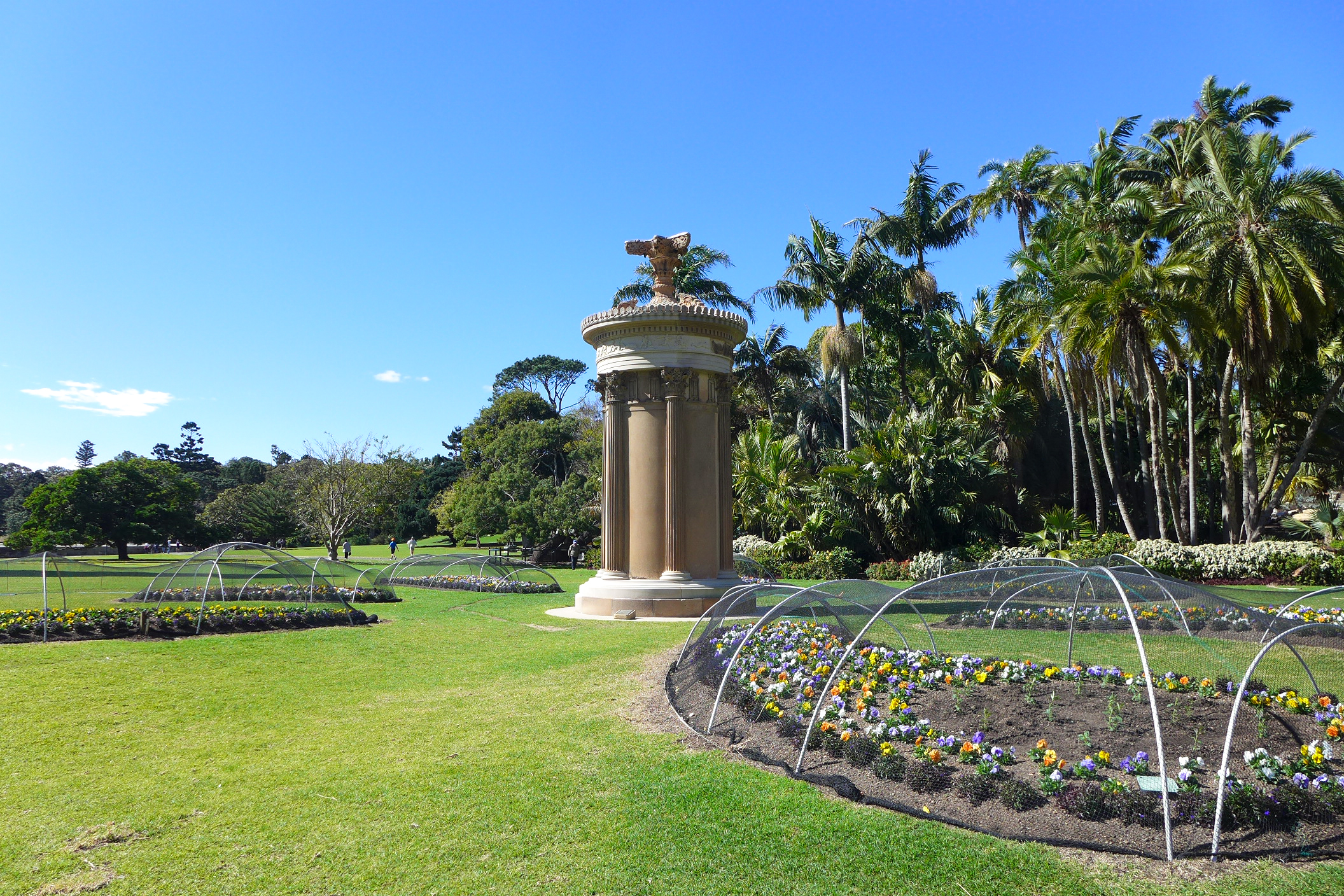
Replica Choragic Monument of Lysicrates

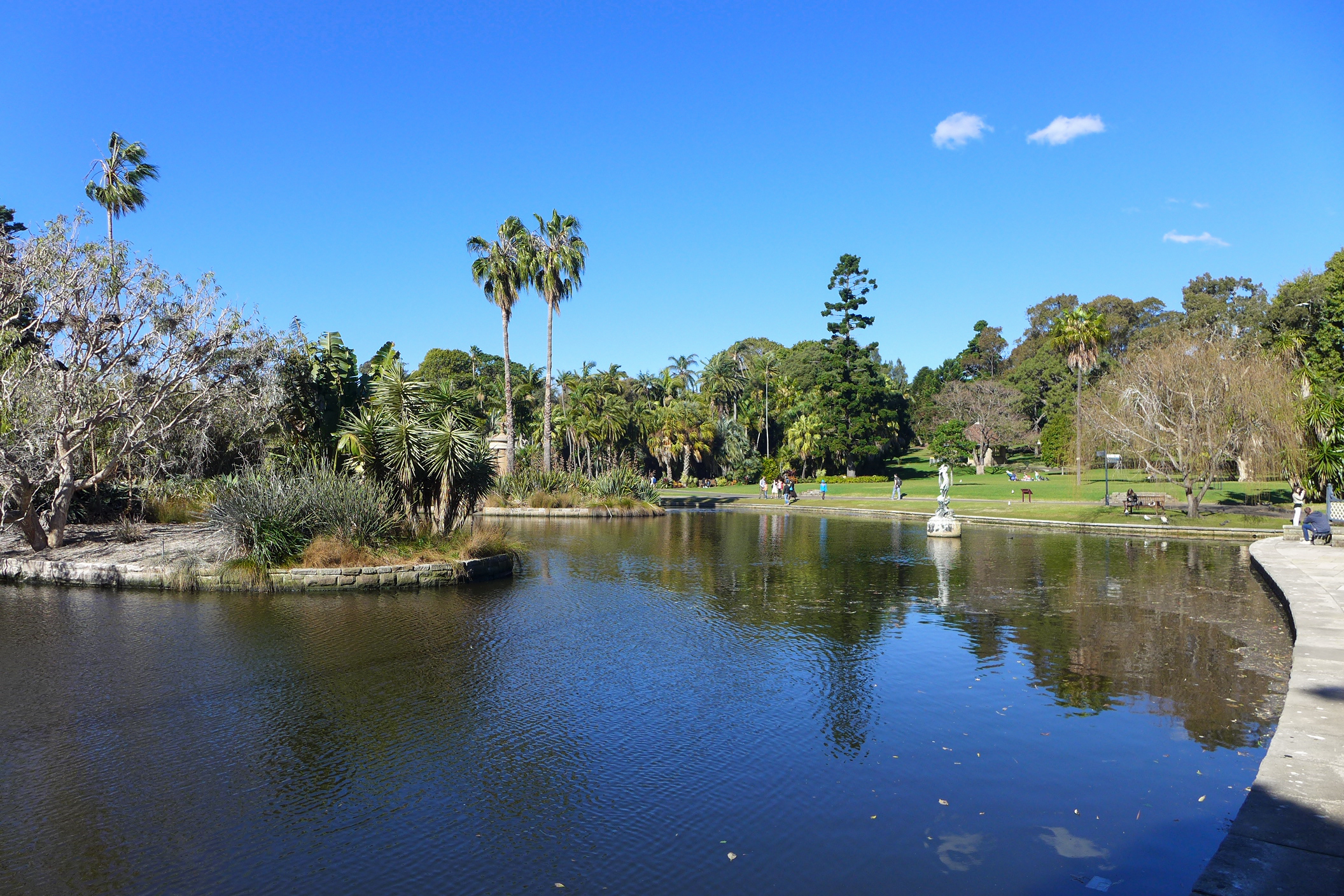
The main ponds in winter

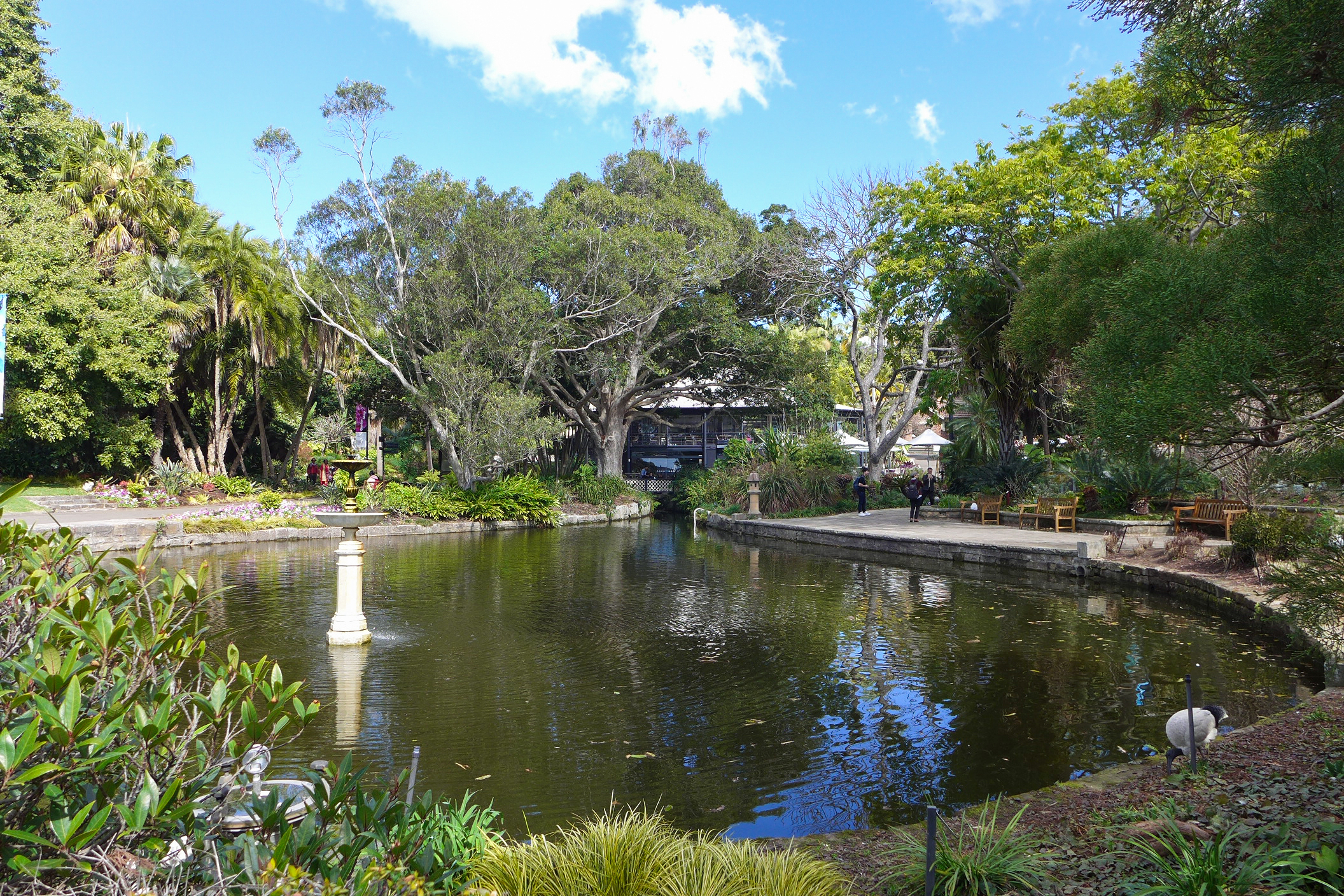
Lotus Pond in winter

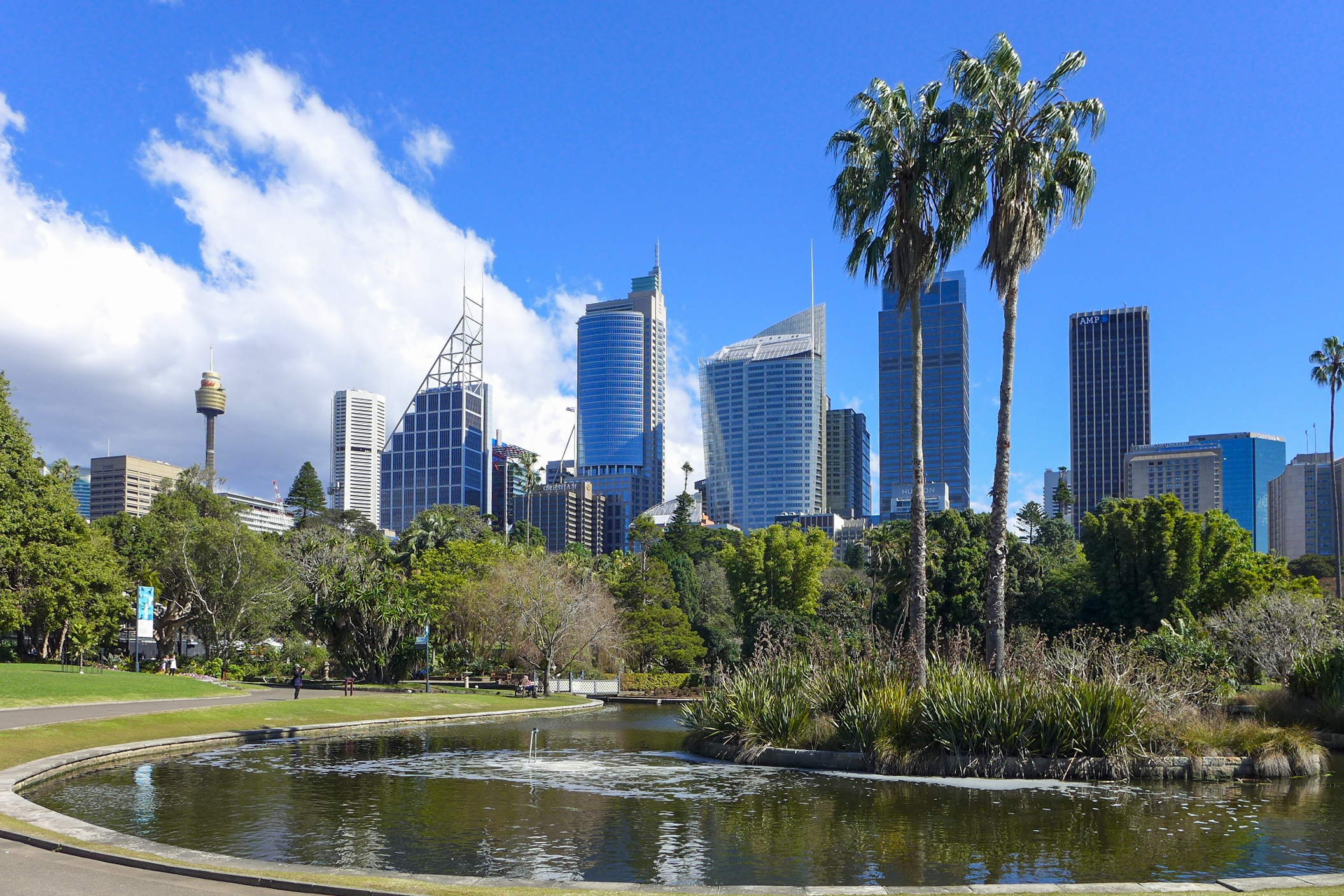
Main ponds looking towards the city

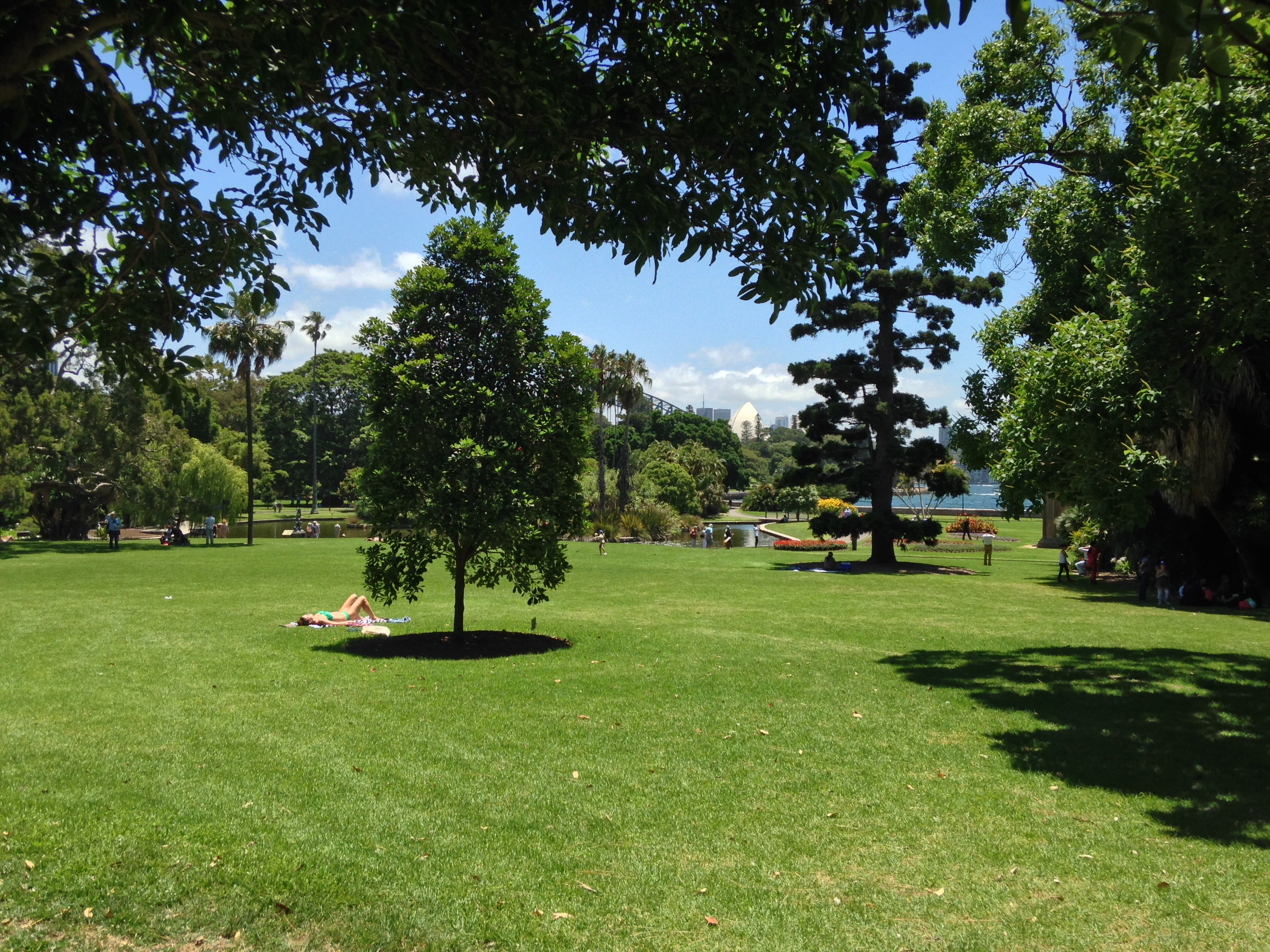
The Band Lawn

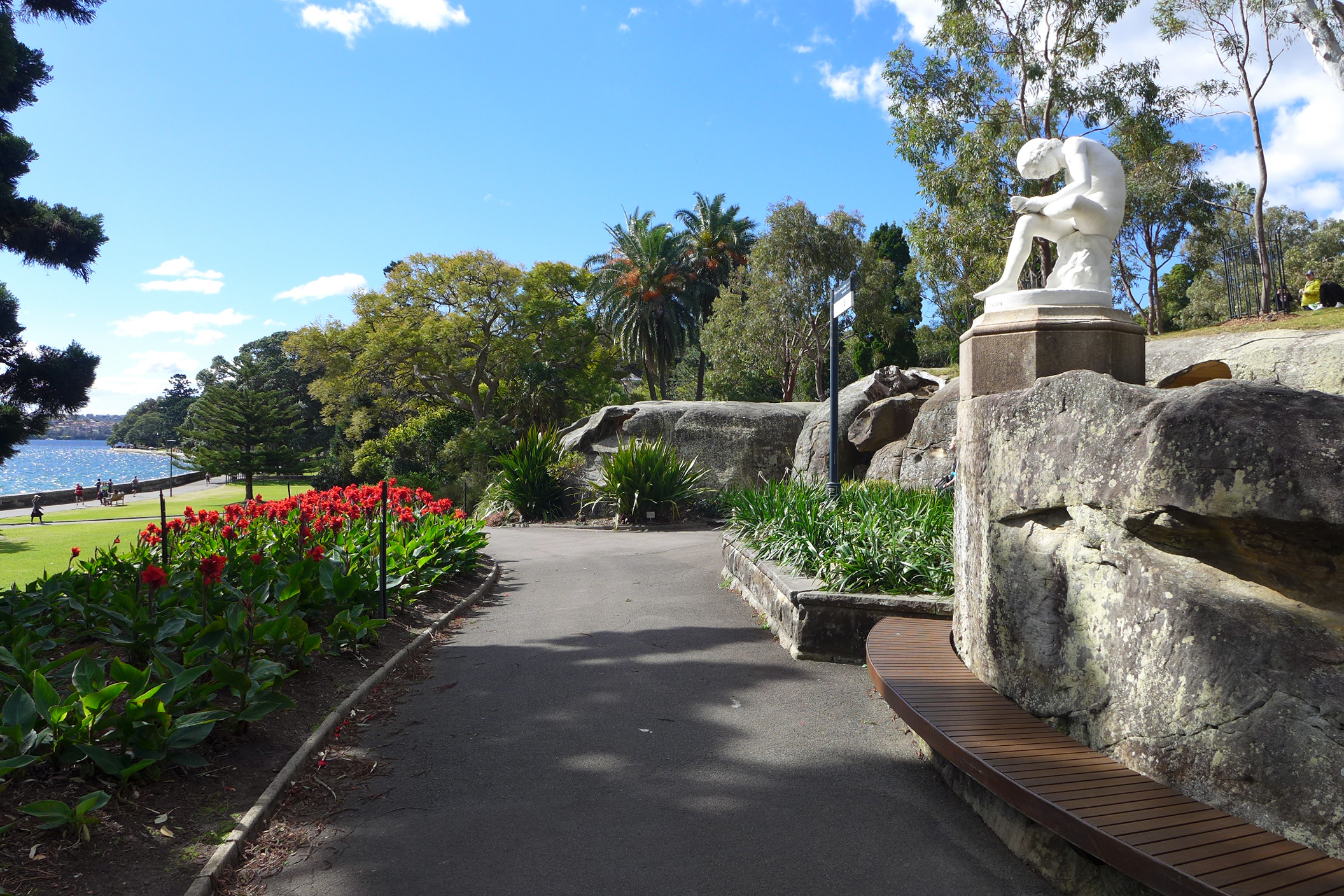
Boy Extracting Thorn Statue

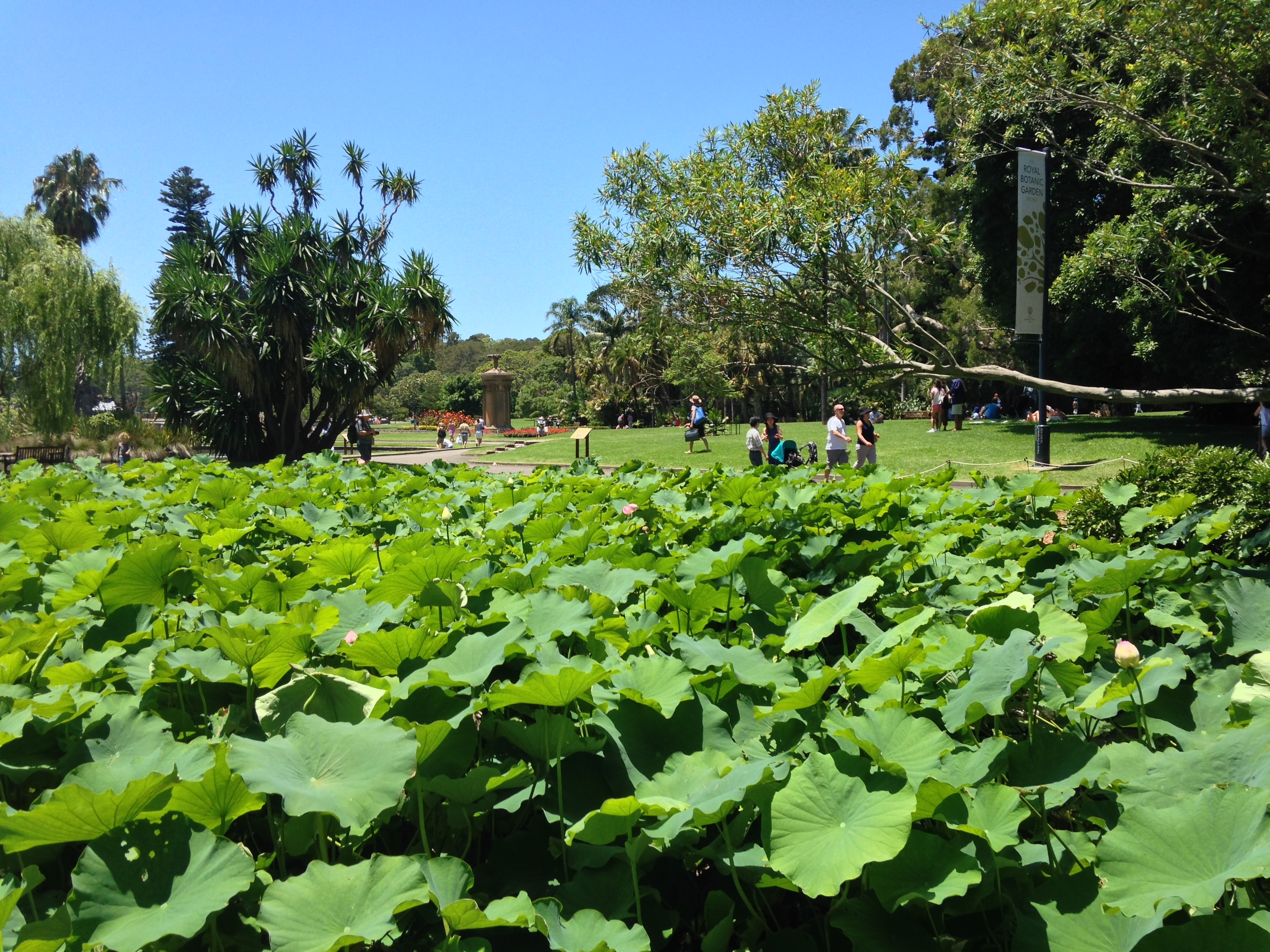
The ponds in summer, full of water plants

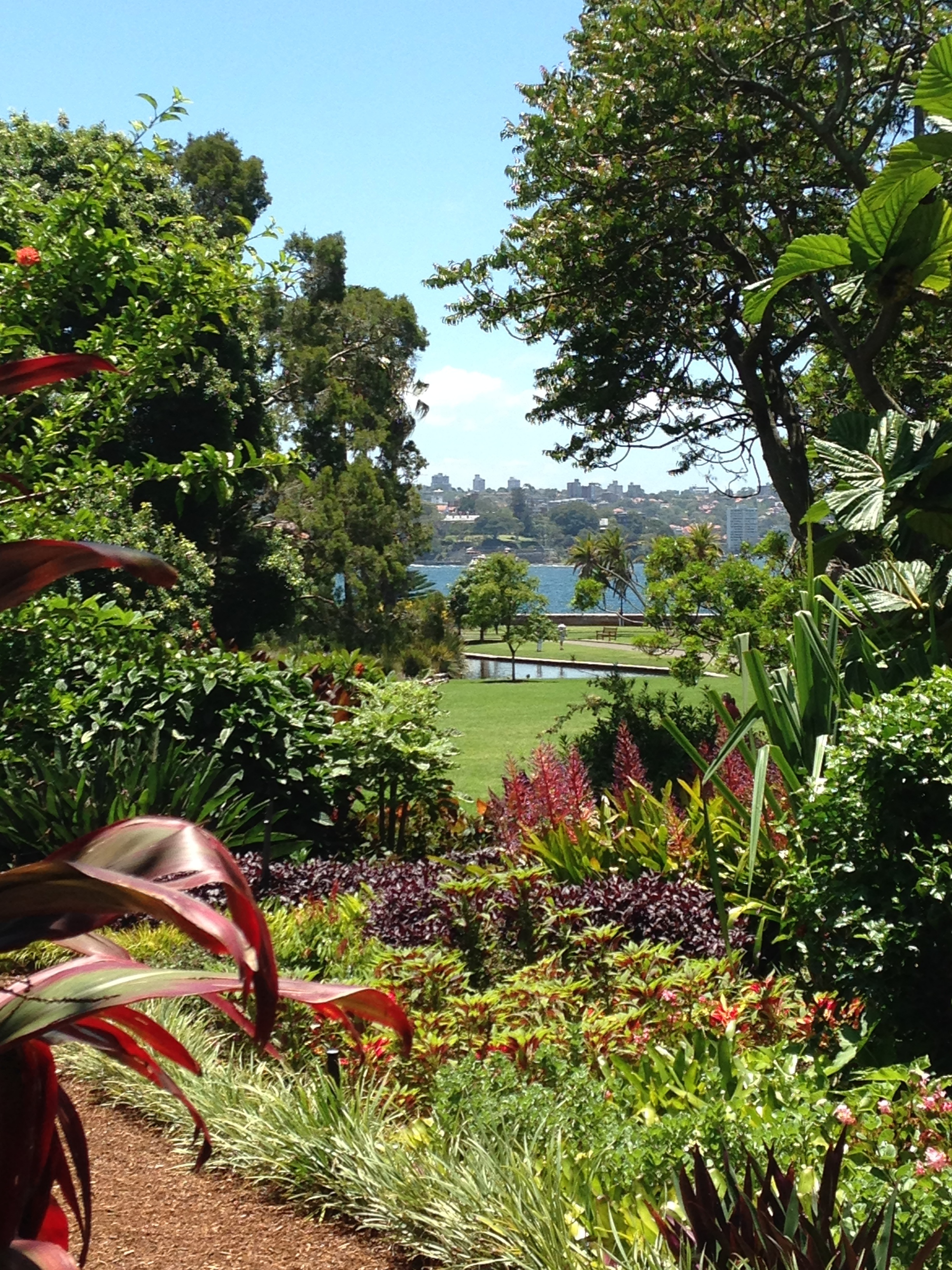
Glimpses of the harbour

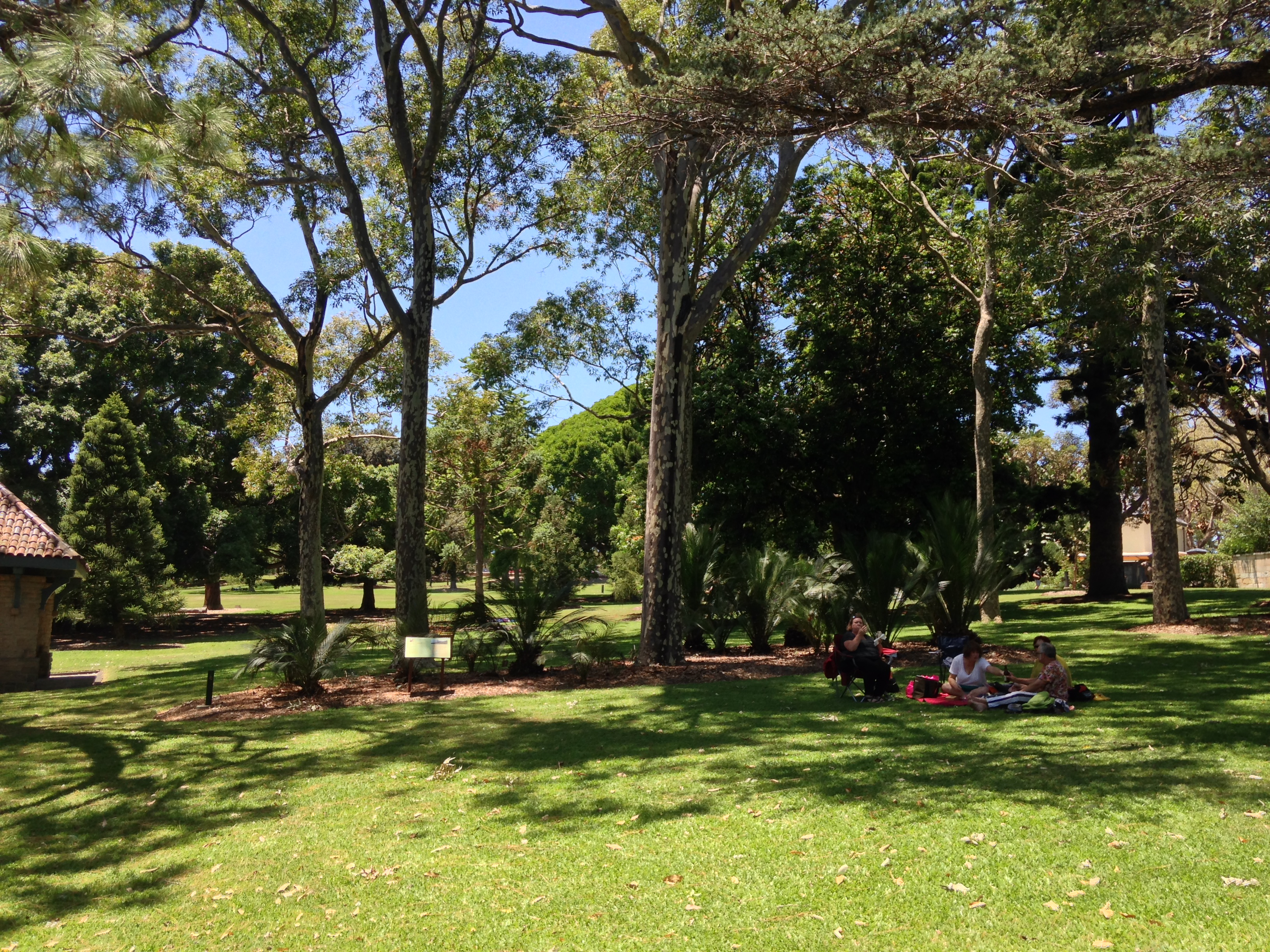
Picnic lawns

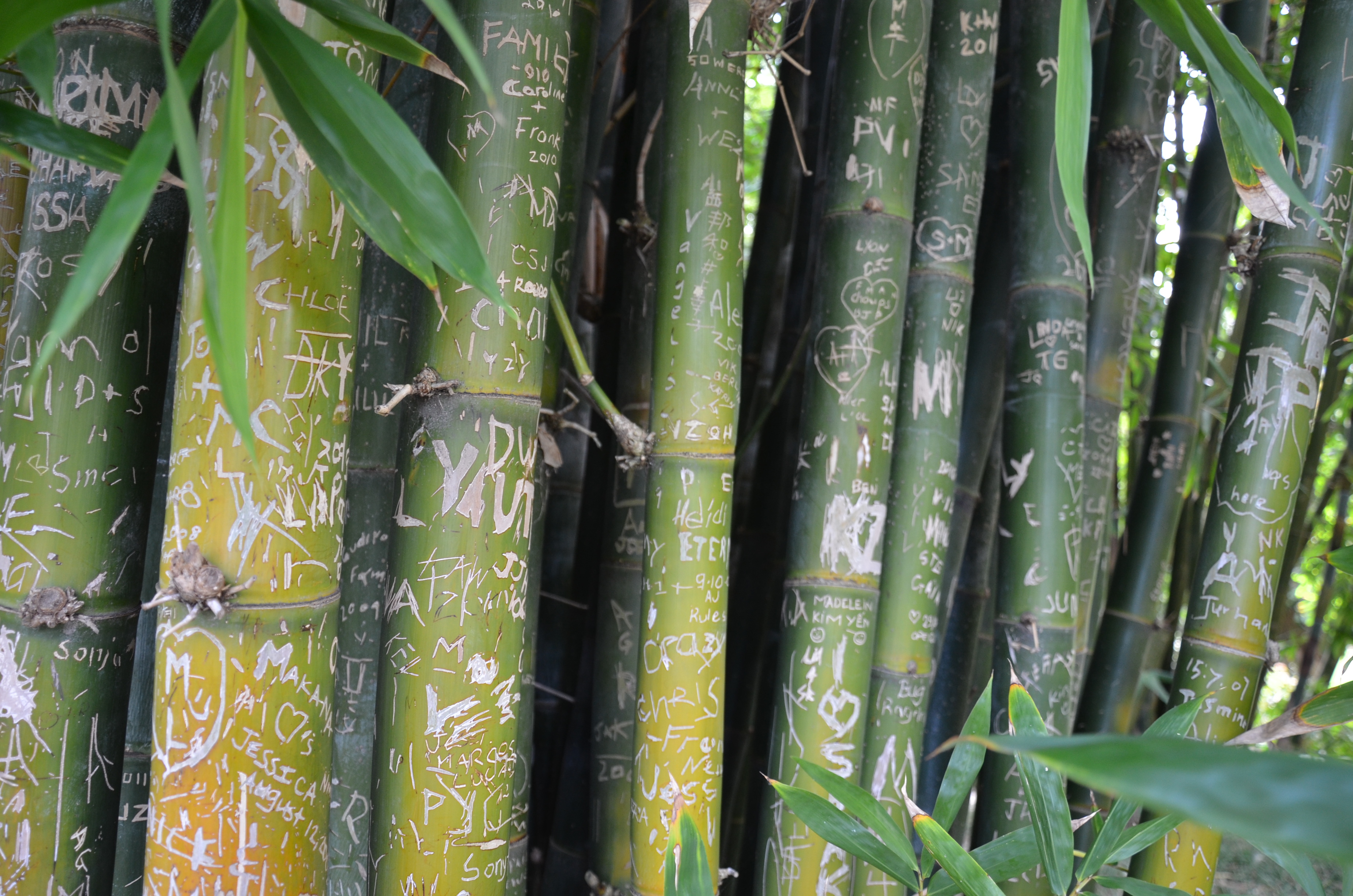
Writings in bamboo plant at Royal Botanic Garden, Circular Quay, Sydney

=== Middle Gardens ===
The long rectangular beds have evolved from the rectangular beds of the earliest garden. The land before the first Government House and Bennelong Point was laid out in the manner of an English park, the Botanic Garden was treated in a purely functional way. The gate in the wall which Macquarie had completed in 1816 to protect the garden from the harbour, and which now separates the Middle and Lower Gardens. Fraser's plantings in what is now called the "Palm Grove", made between 1827 and 1828 from his Brisbane district and northern NSW travels survive, and include hoop pines (Araucaria cunninghamii), weeping lilly pillies (Waterhousia floribunda), a hoop pine (Araucaria cunninghamii), two swamp oaks (Casuarina cunninghamiana) on the eastern side of the palm grove. On his death in 1831 he was succeeded by Richard Cunningham. His brother, the explorer Allan Cunningham, was also a director. A native red cedar Fraser collected in 1822 formerly thought to have been from the Parramatta region has been genetically tested and found to have been collected in the Dorrigo region. This tree grows still near the Palm House (beside Farm Cove Creek in Bed 9).

Charles Moore planted the Palm Grove which has an internationally significant collection of palms and rainforest species in the Middle Garden. The middle gardens feature the Palm House, the Wollemi Pine, the Succulent Garden, the Rare and Threatened Plant Garden, the Herbarium & Plant Sciences Building, the Lion Gate Lodge, the Begonia Garden and the Macquarie Wall and Spring Walk.

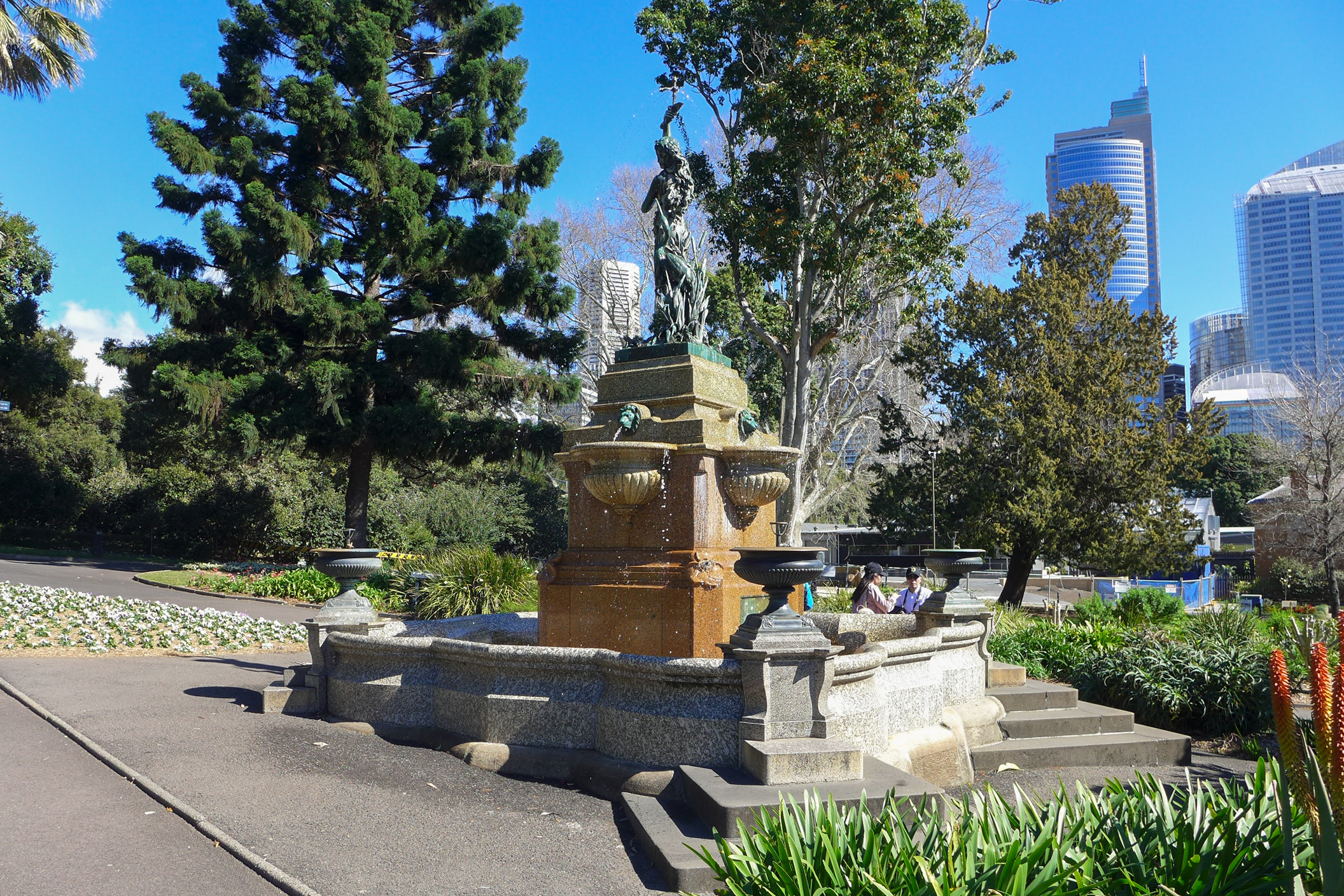
Entrance Fountain

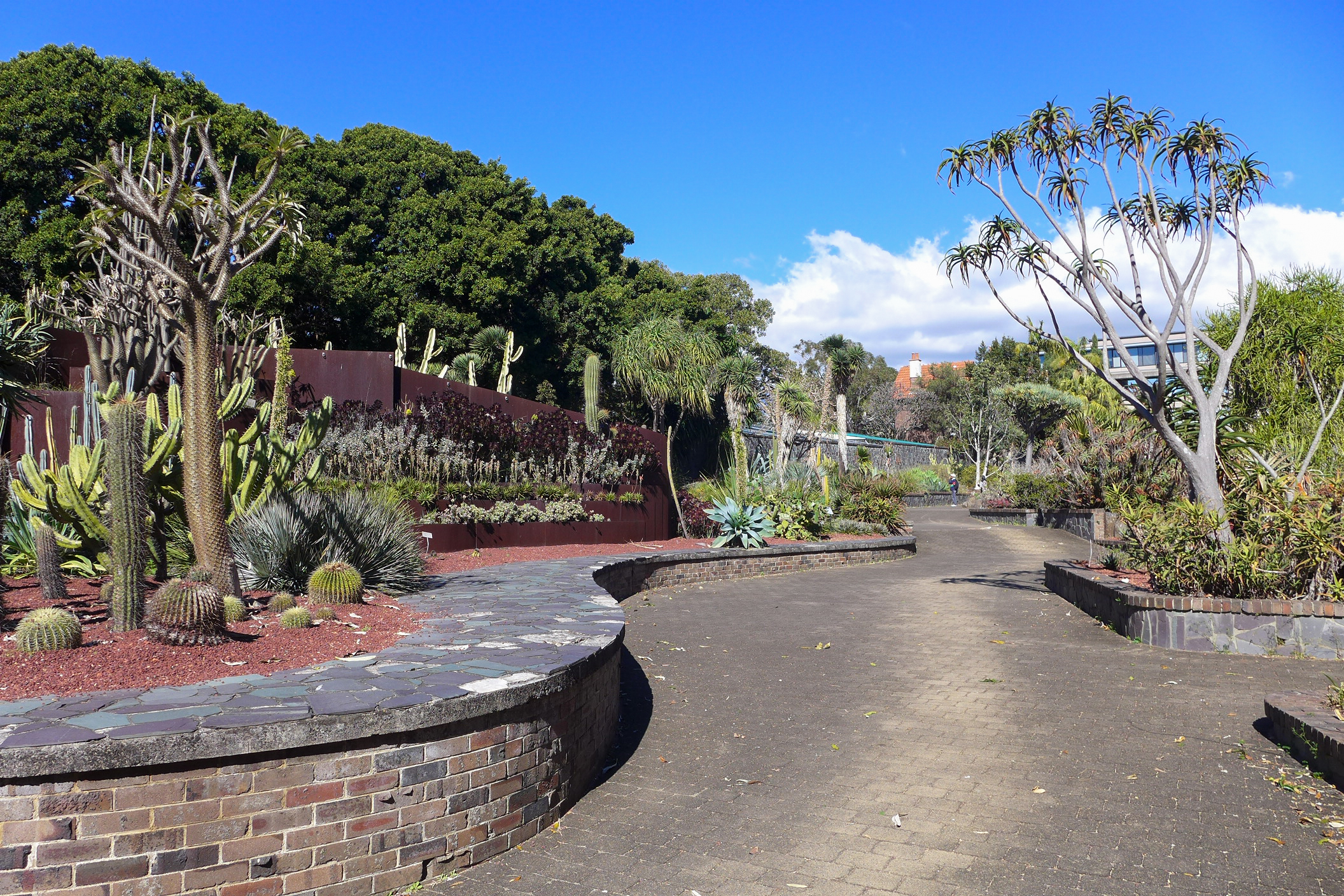
Succulent Garden

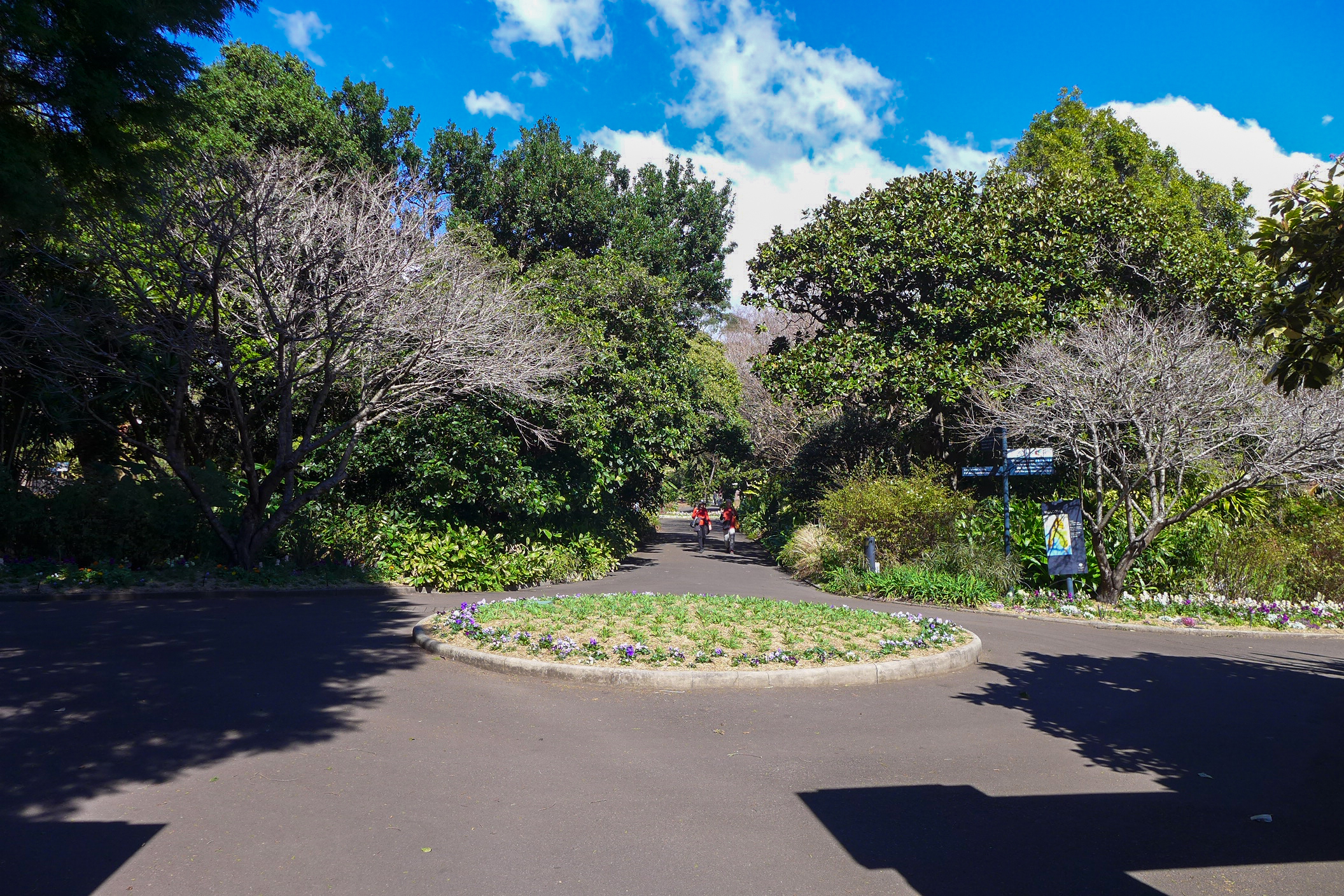
Garden

=== Palace Gardens ===
The Palace Gardens feature the Calyx, the Rainforest Walk, the Pioneer Garden, the Morshead Fountain Gate, the Palace Garden Gate, the Rose Garden & Pavilion, the Turf Plots, the Old Mill Garden, the Herb Garden and the Sydney Conservatorium of Music.

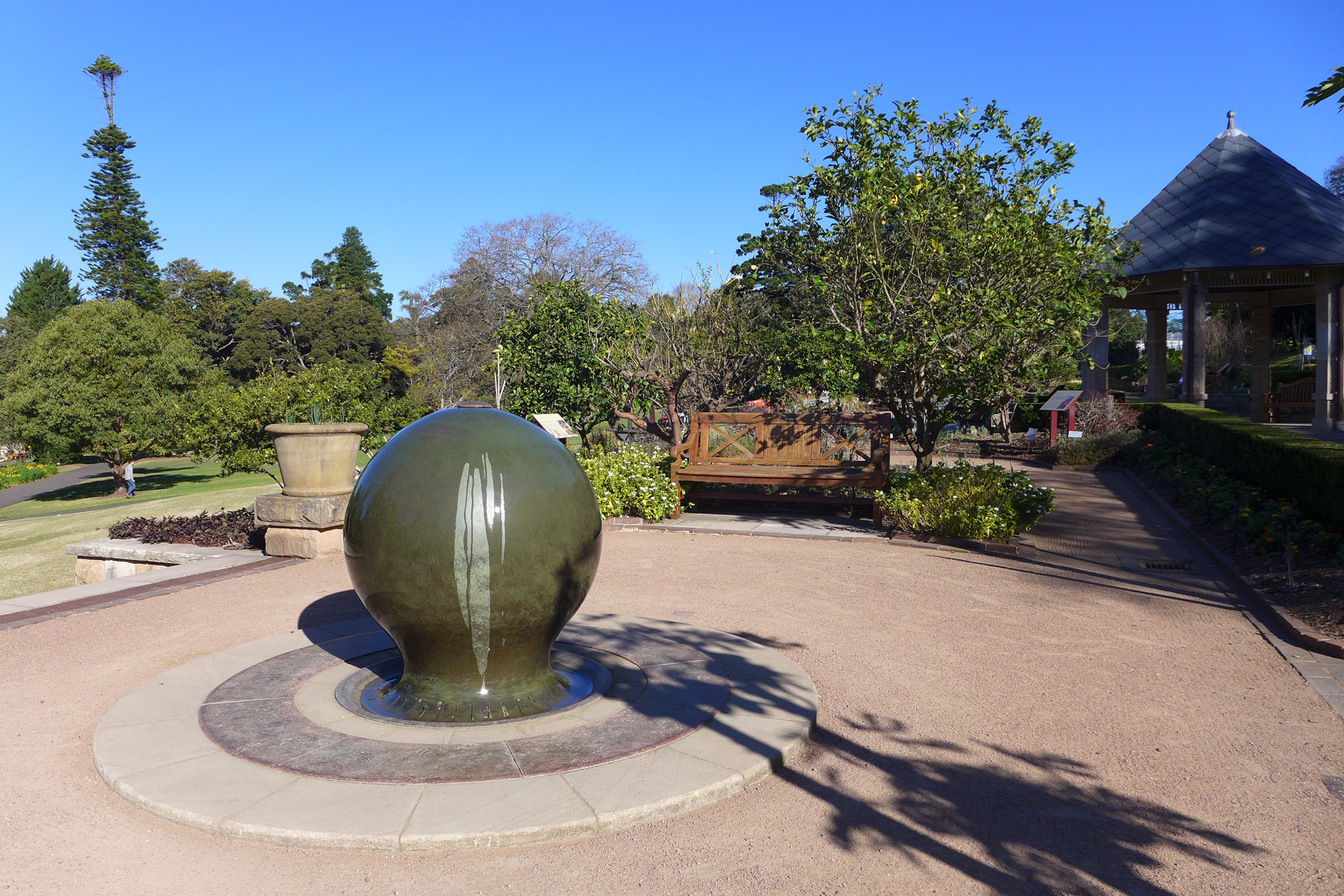
Sandstone Pavilion – Herb Garden

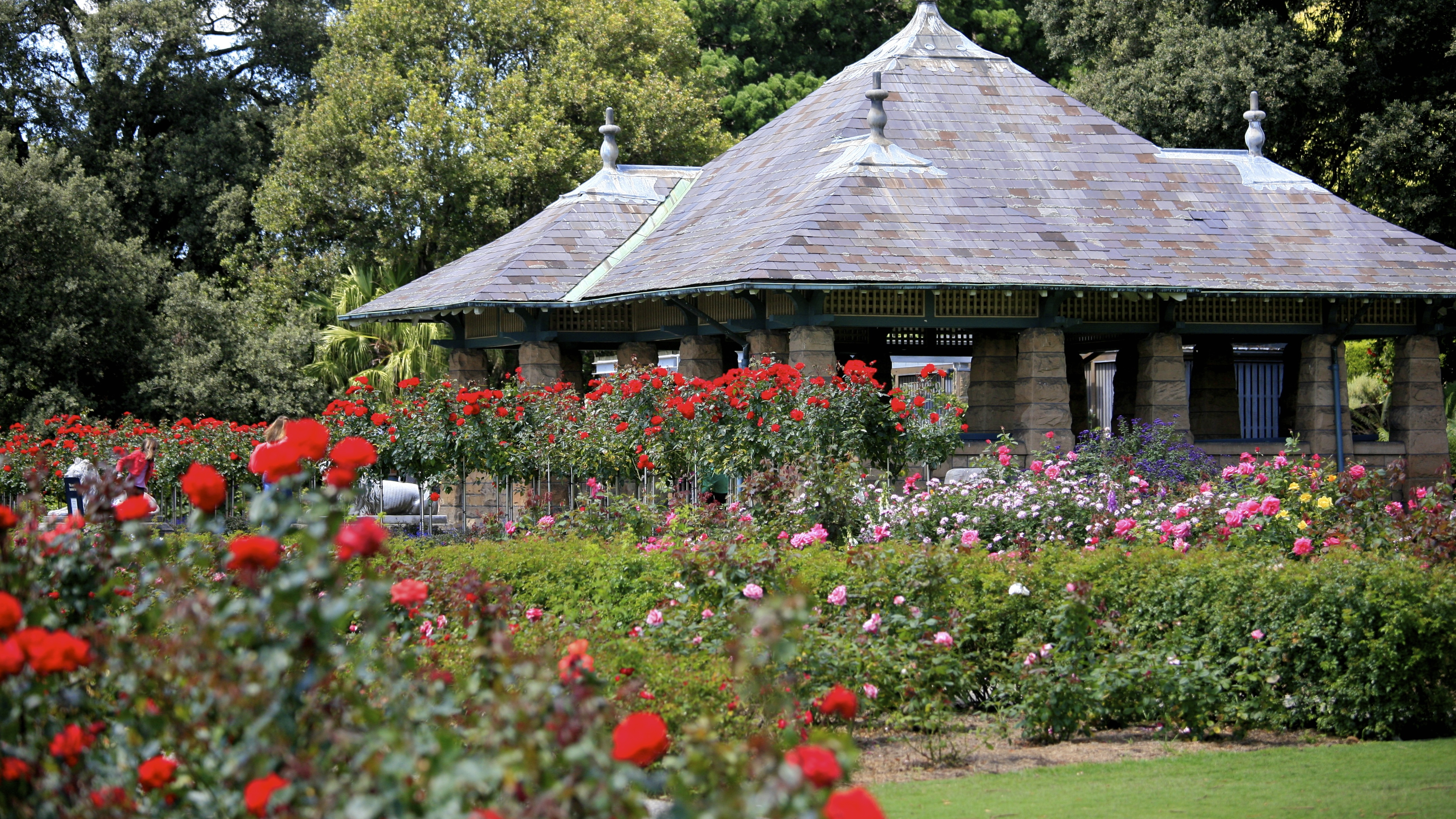
The Rose Garden

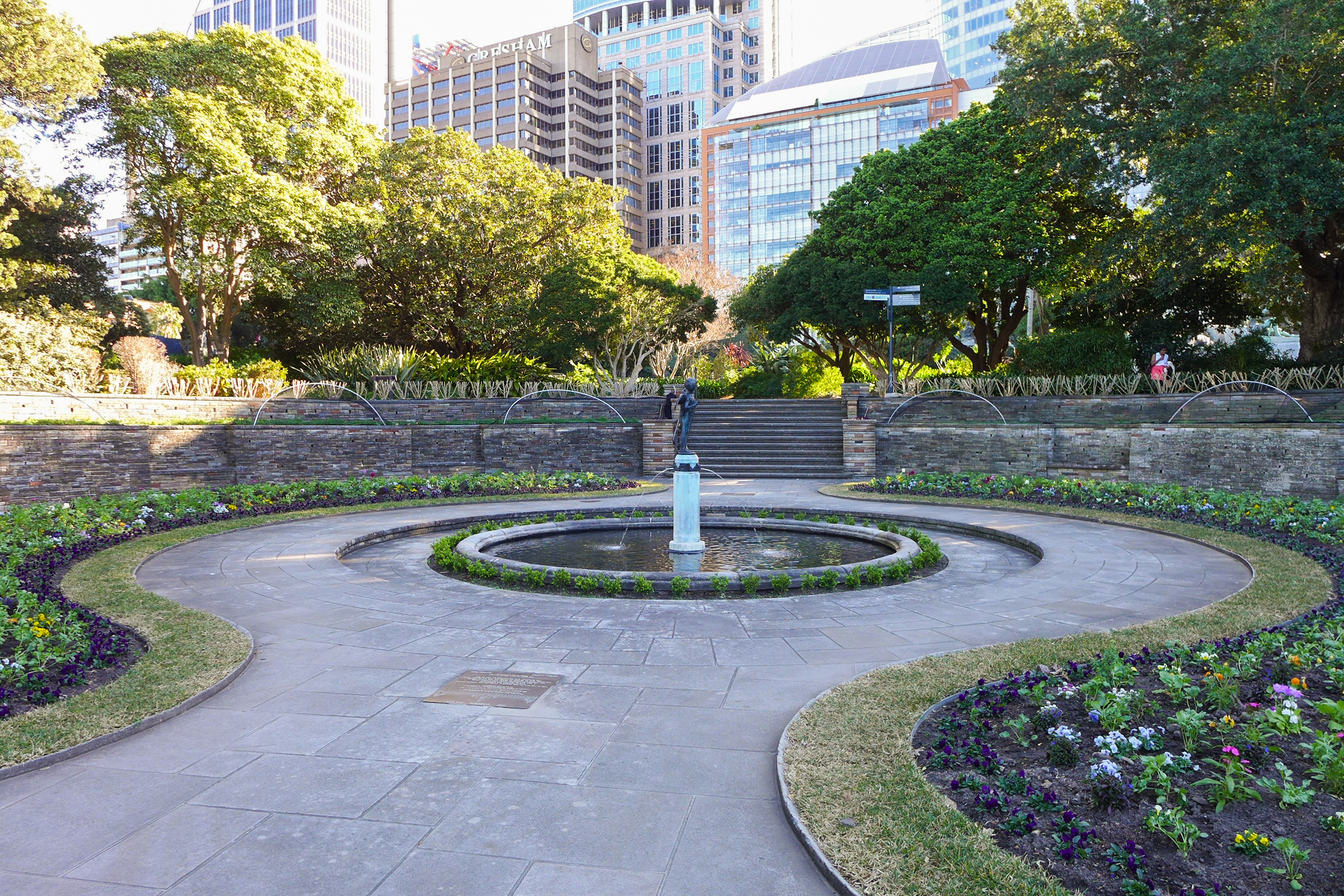
Cupid Statue

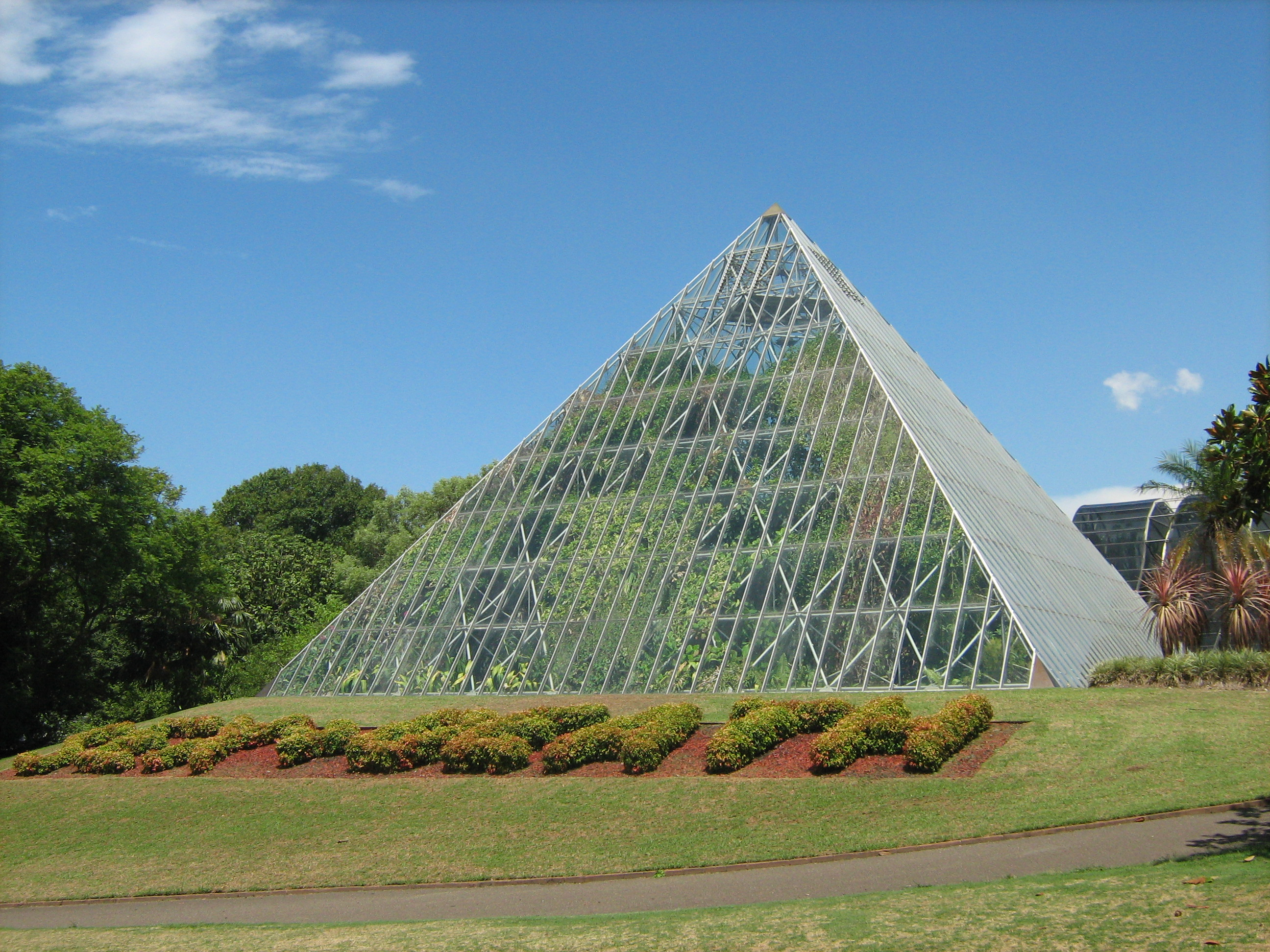
The Tropical Centre pyramid (2008)

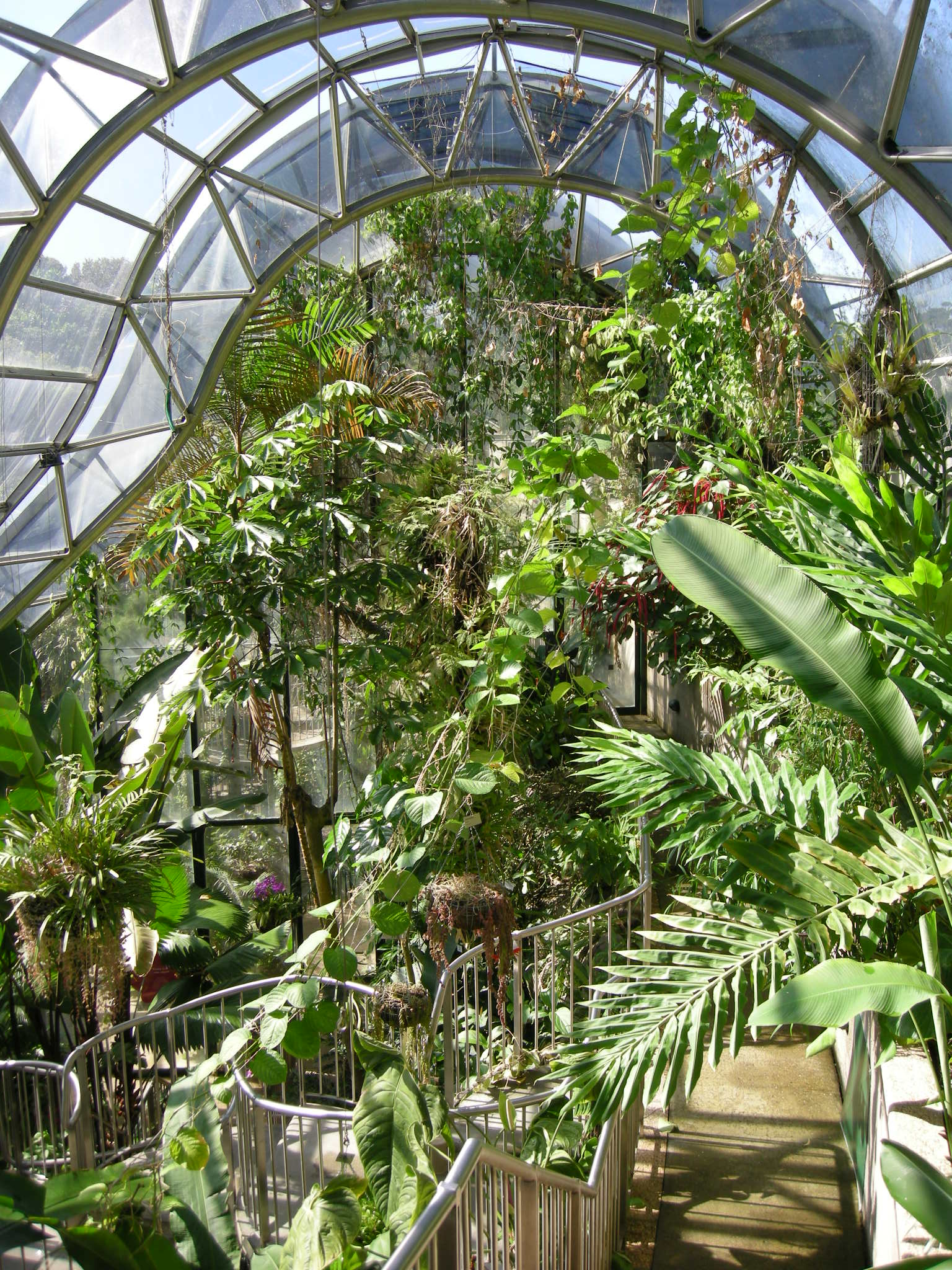
Inside the Tropical Centre

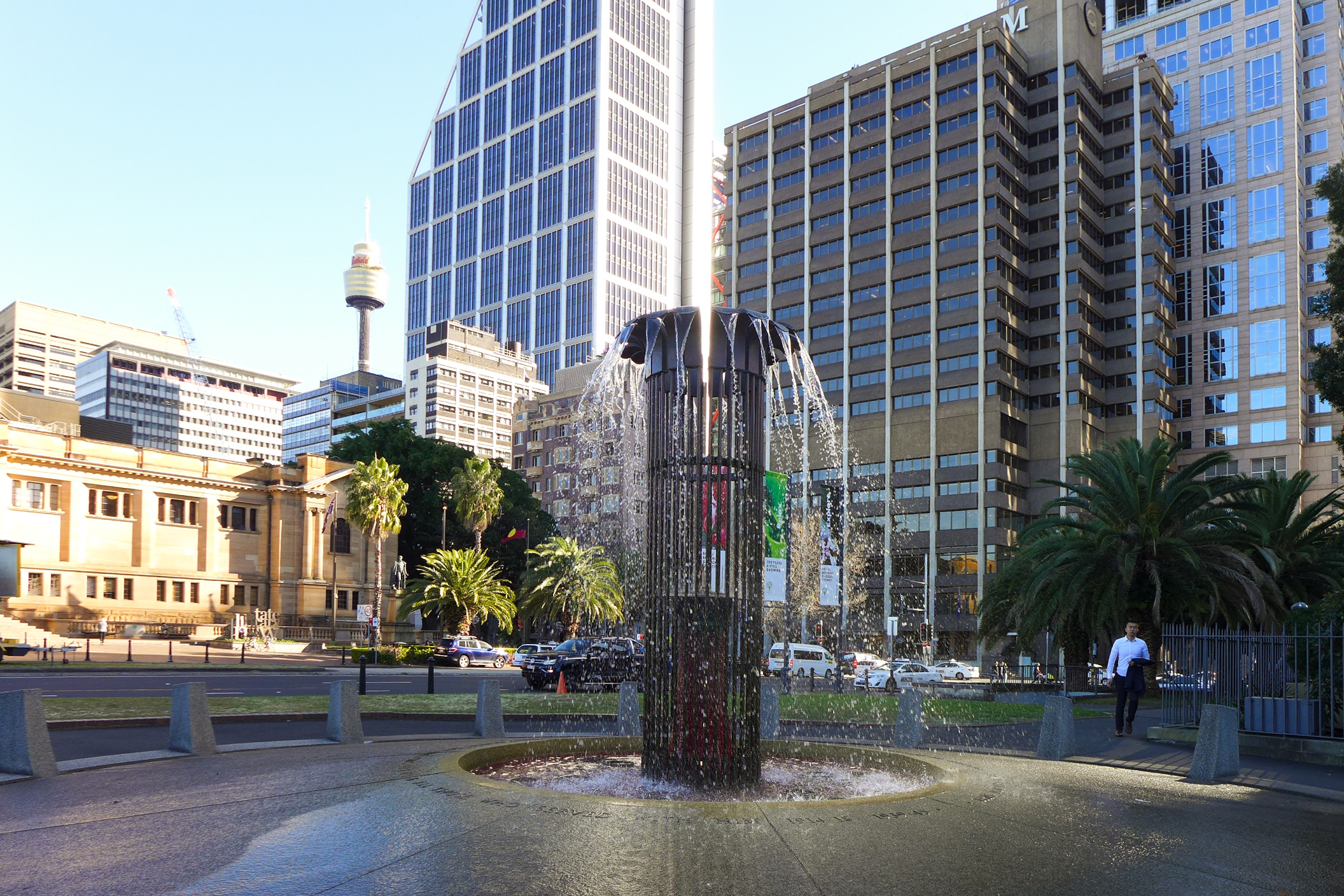
Morshead Fountain

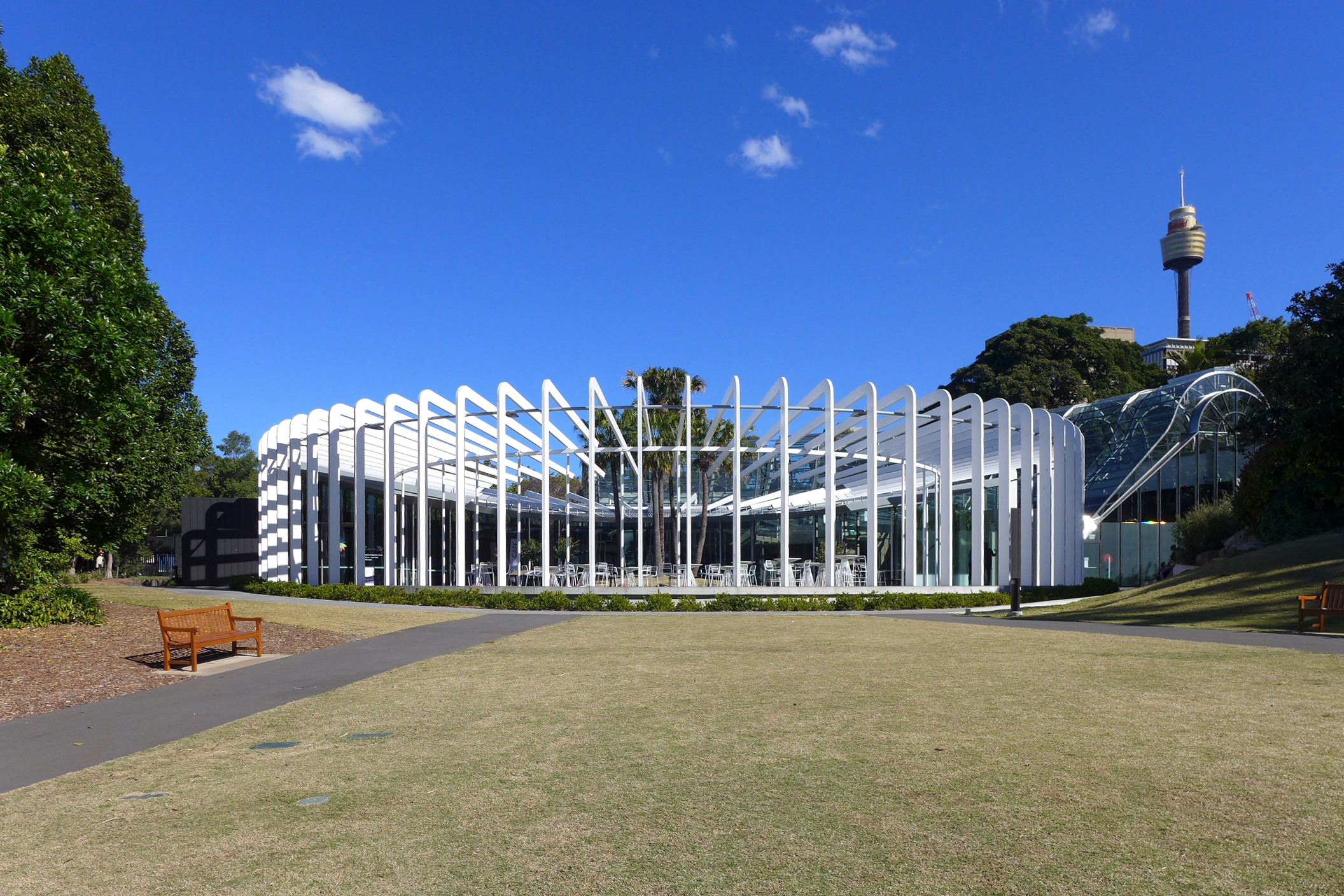
The Calyx glass house and function centre

=== Bennelong Precinct ===
The Bennelong Precinct contains Government House, the Parade Ground, the Australian Native Rockery, Bennelong Lawn and the Queen Elizabeth II Gate.

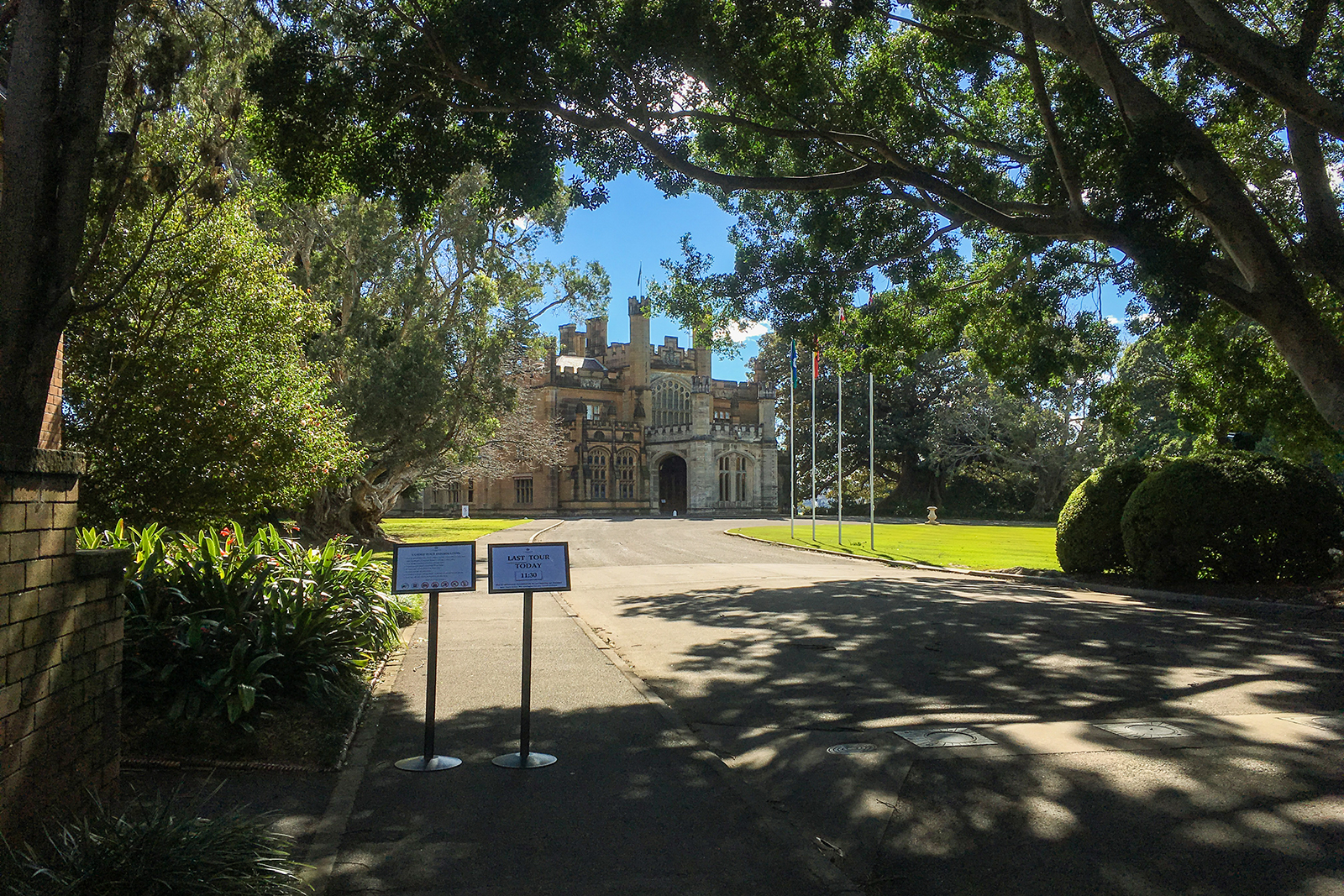
Gateway to Government House

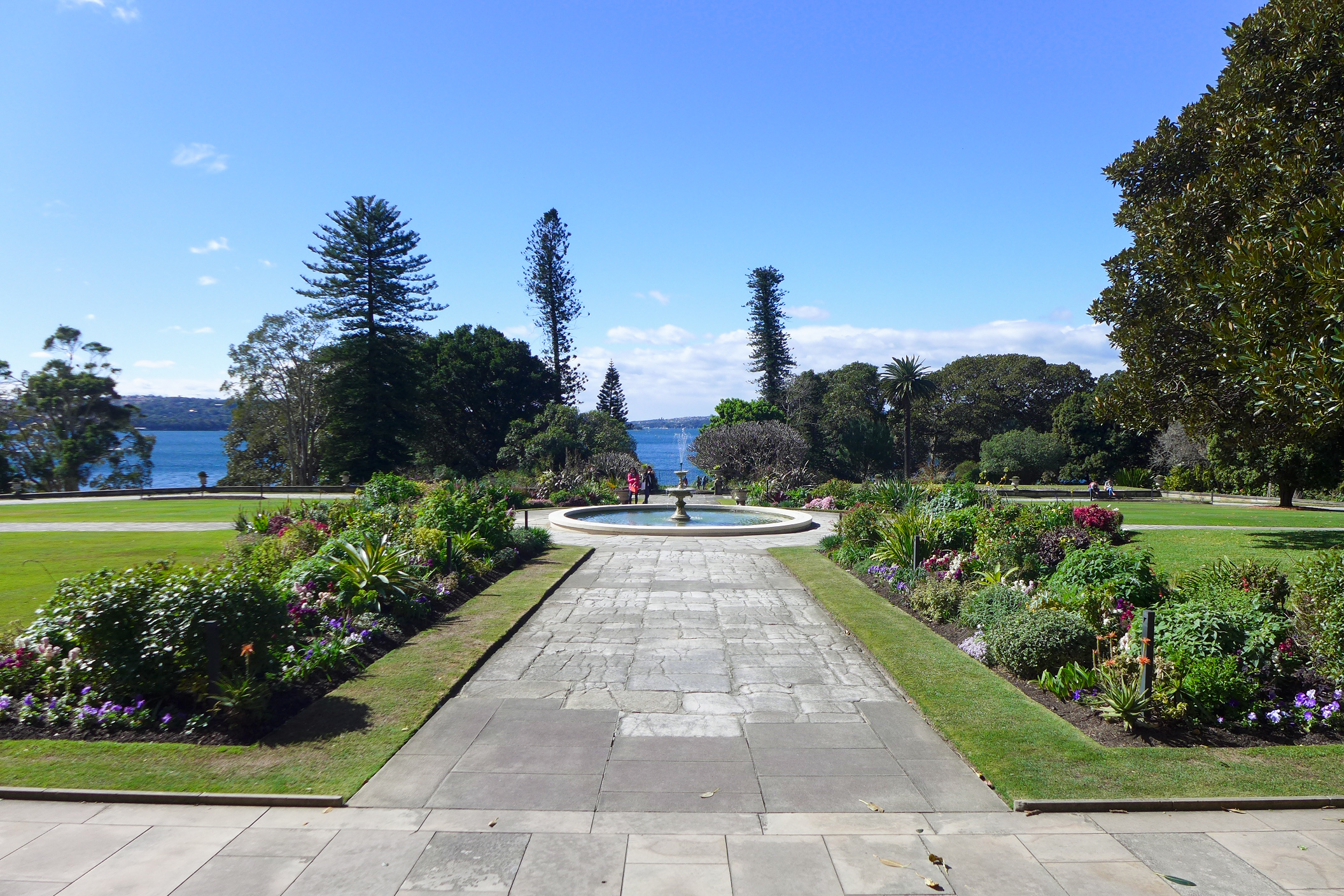
Government House gardens

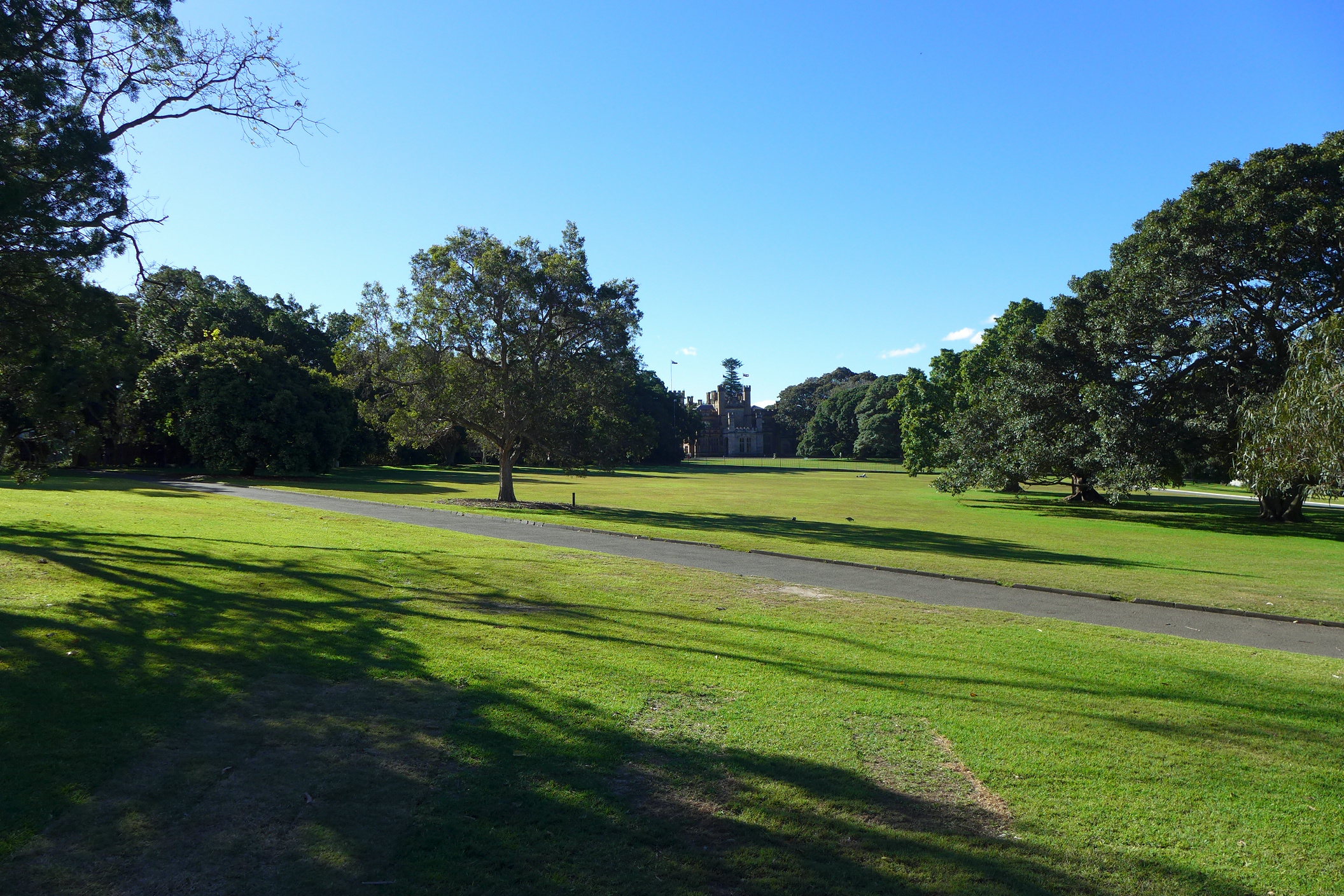
the Parade Ground

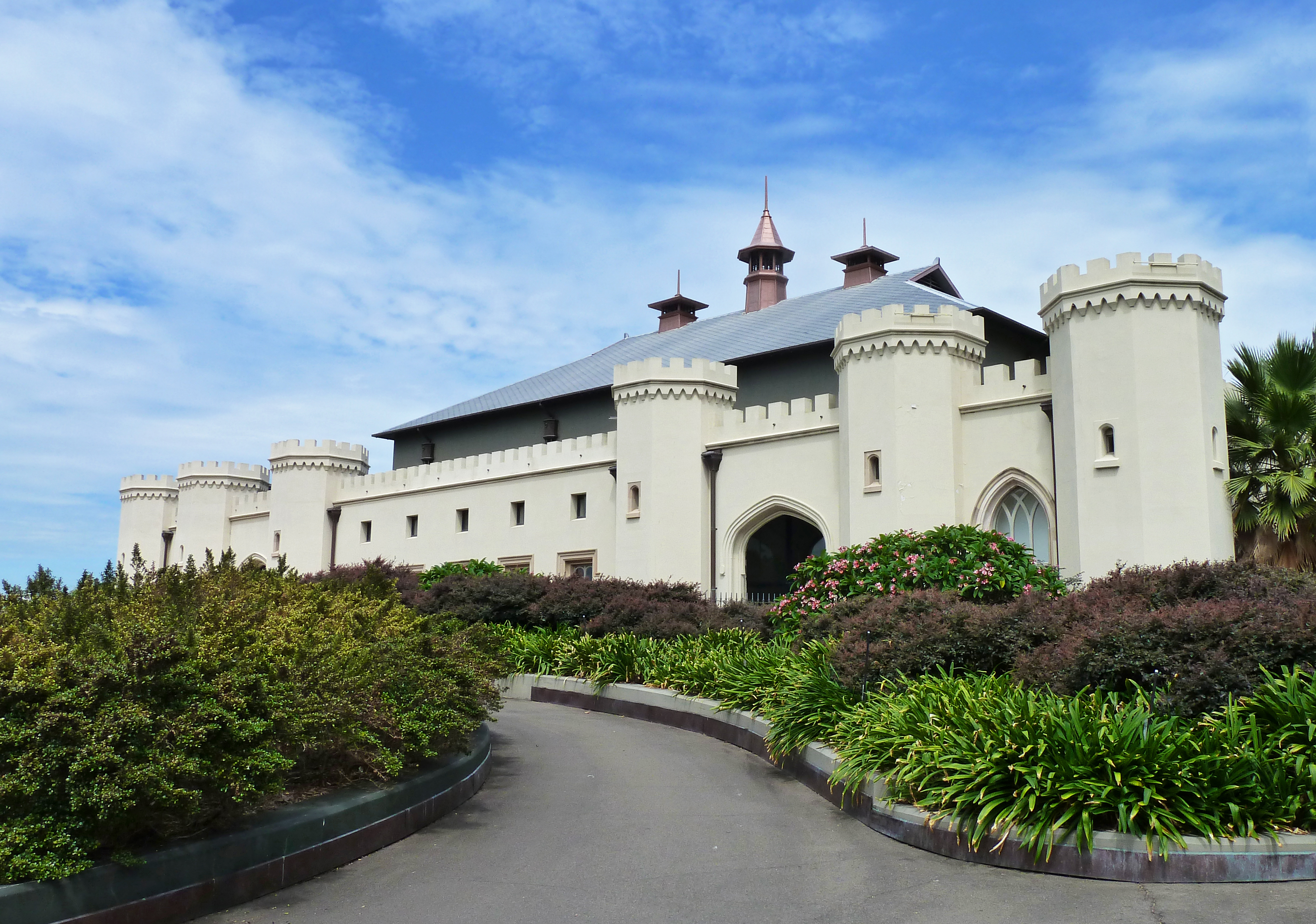
The Conservatorium of Music nestled in the Garden

=== Palm Grove Centre ===
The Palm Grove Centre features the Palm Grove itself, a Cafe, Garden Shop and the Botanic Gardens Restaurant.

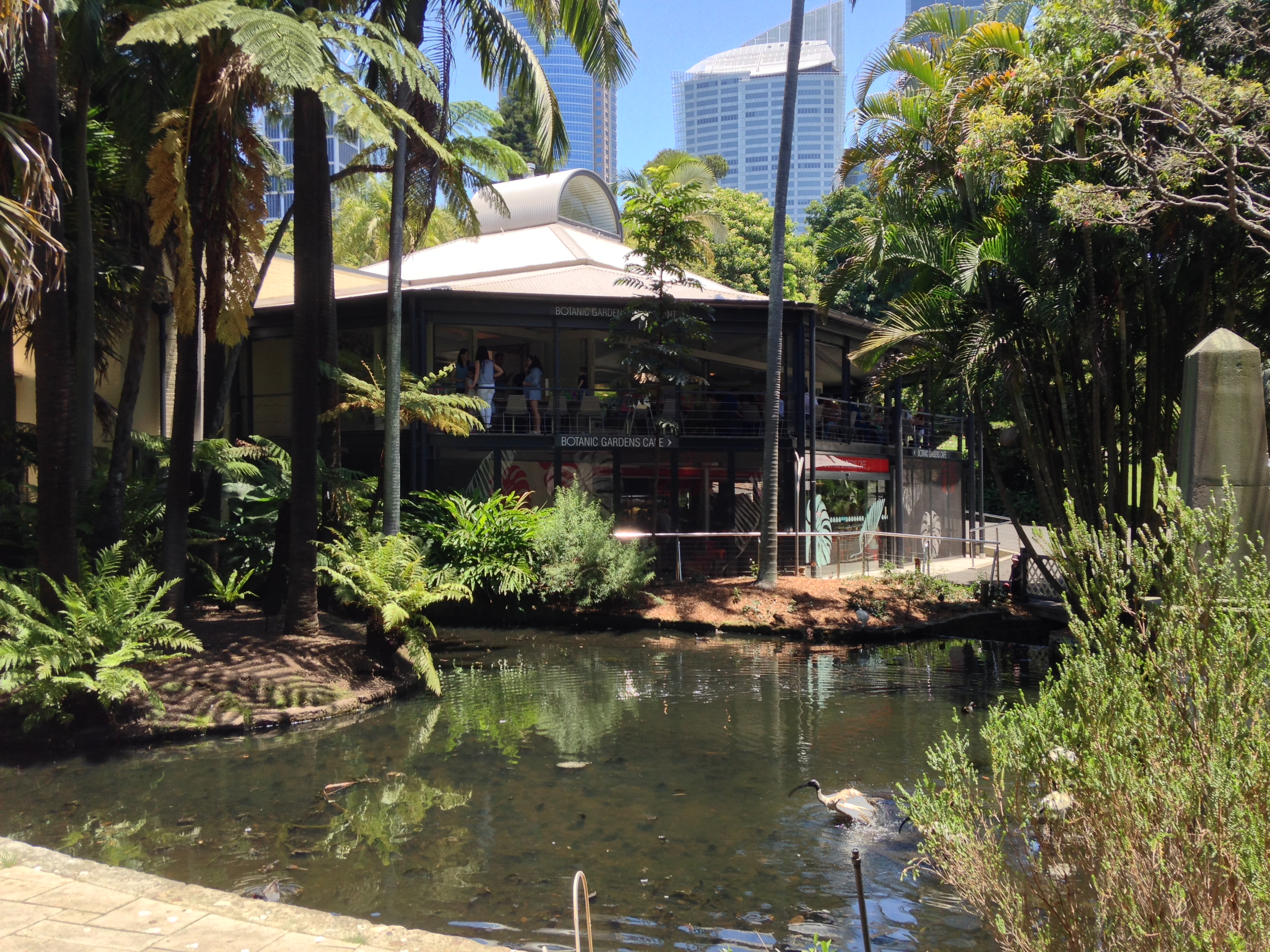
Cafe and Restaurant

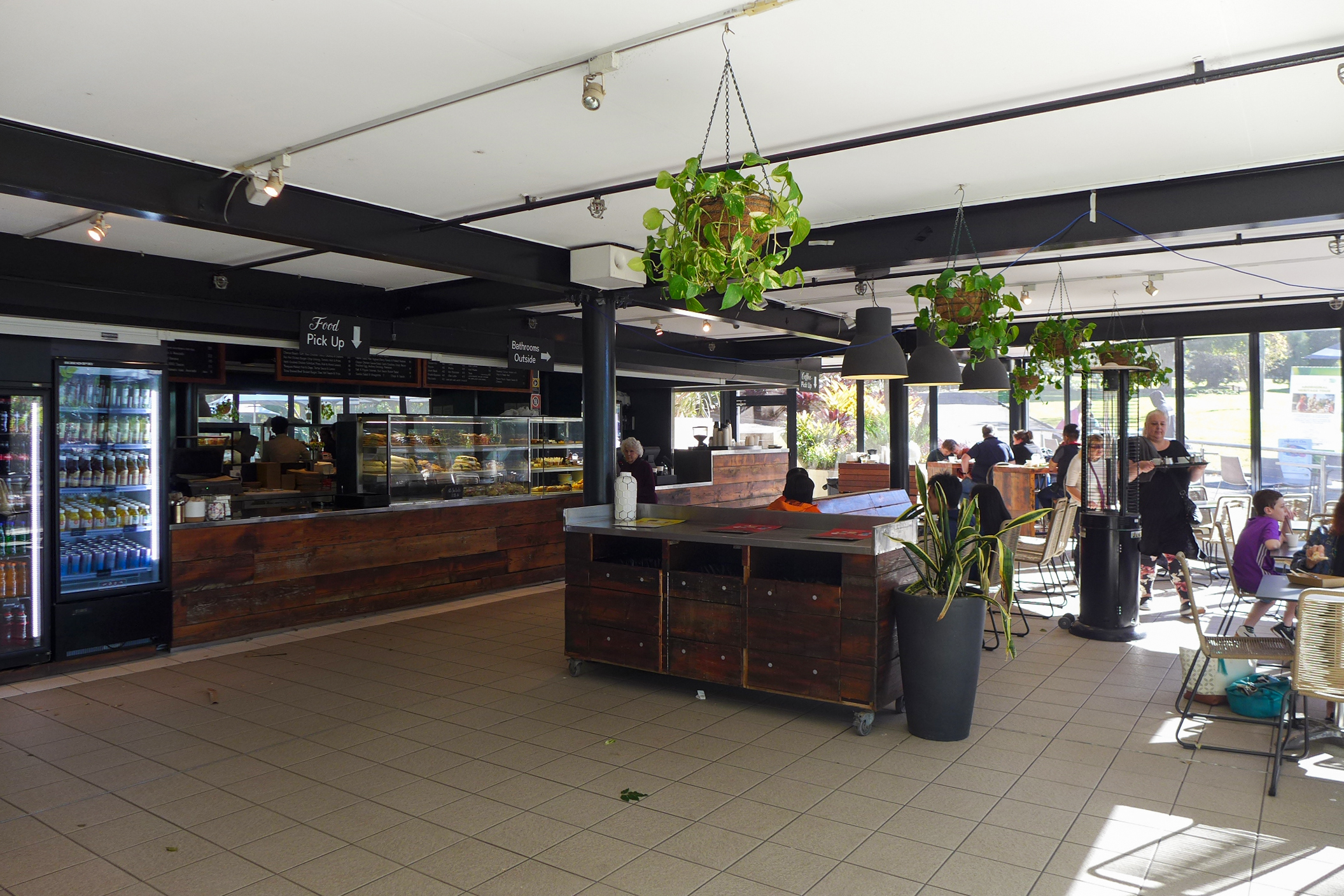
Cafe and Restaurant interior

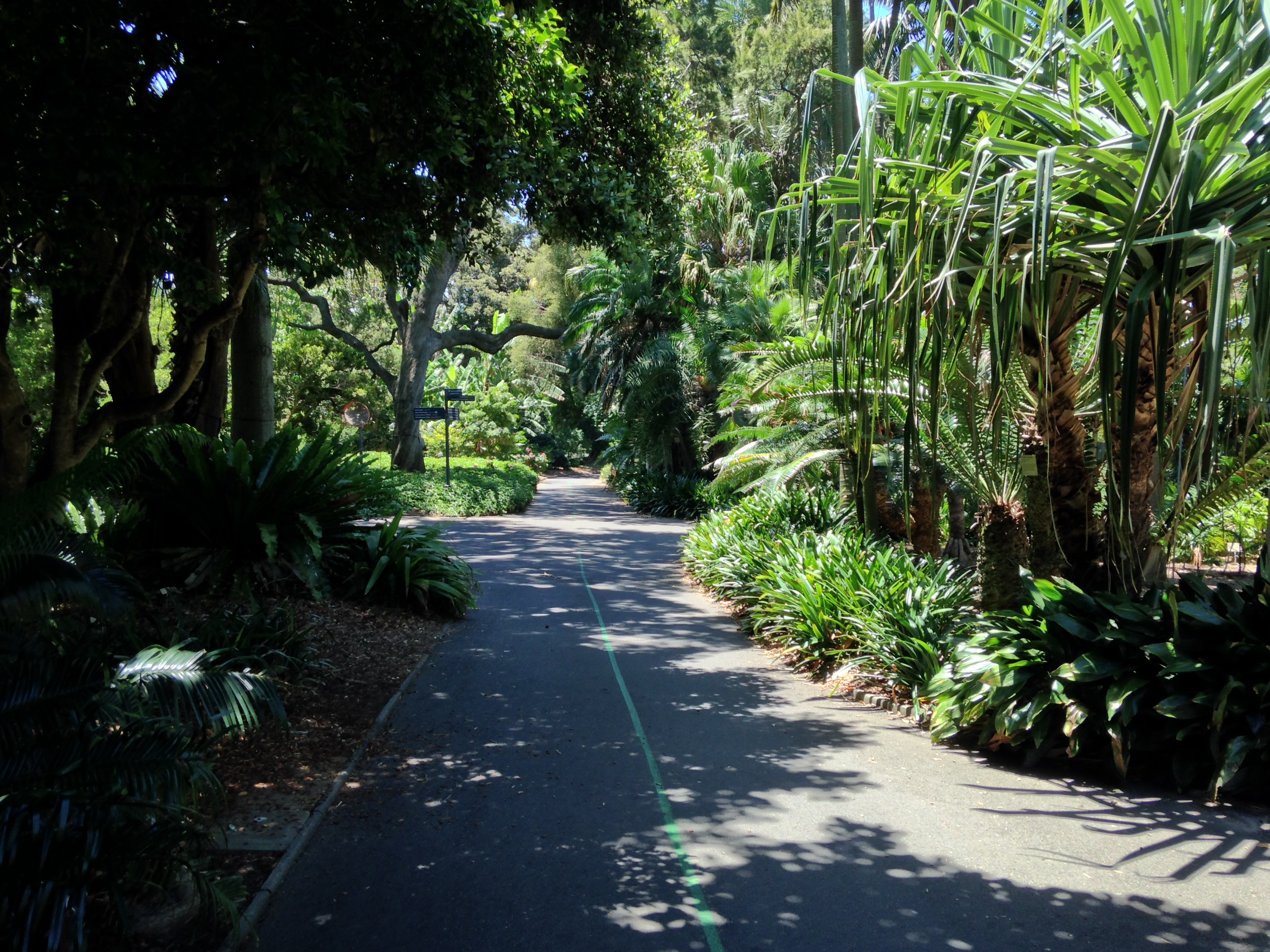
The Palm Grove

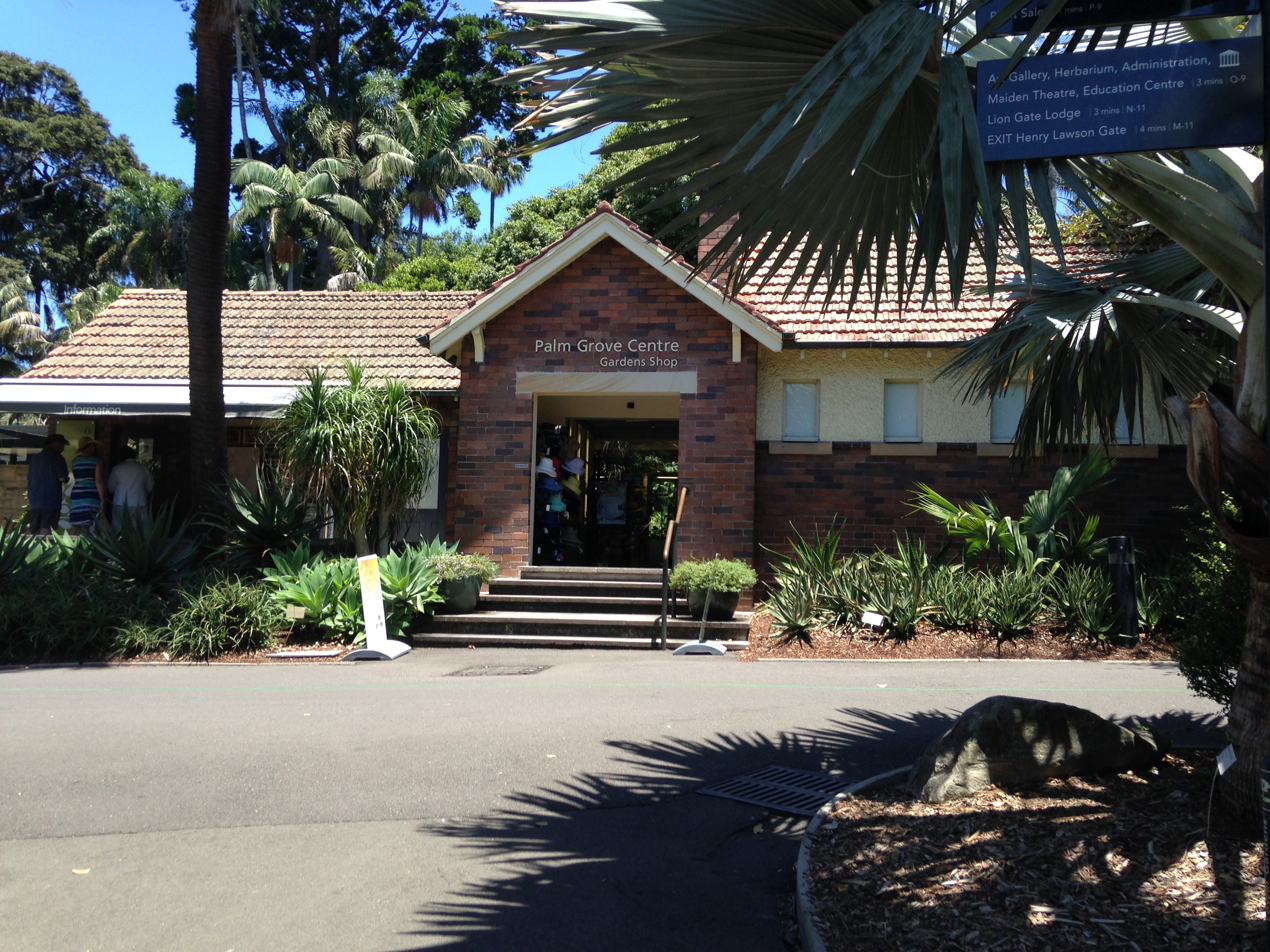
The Garden Shop

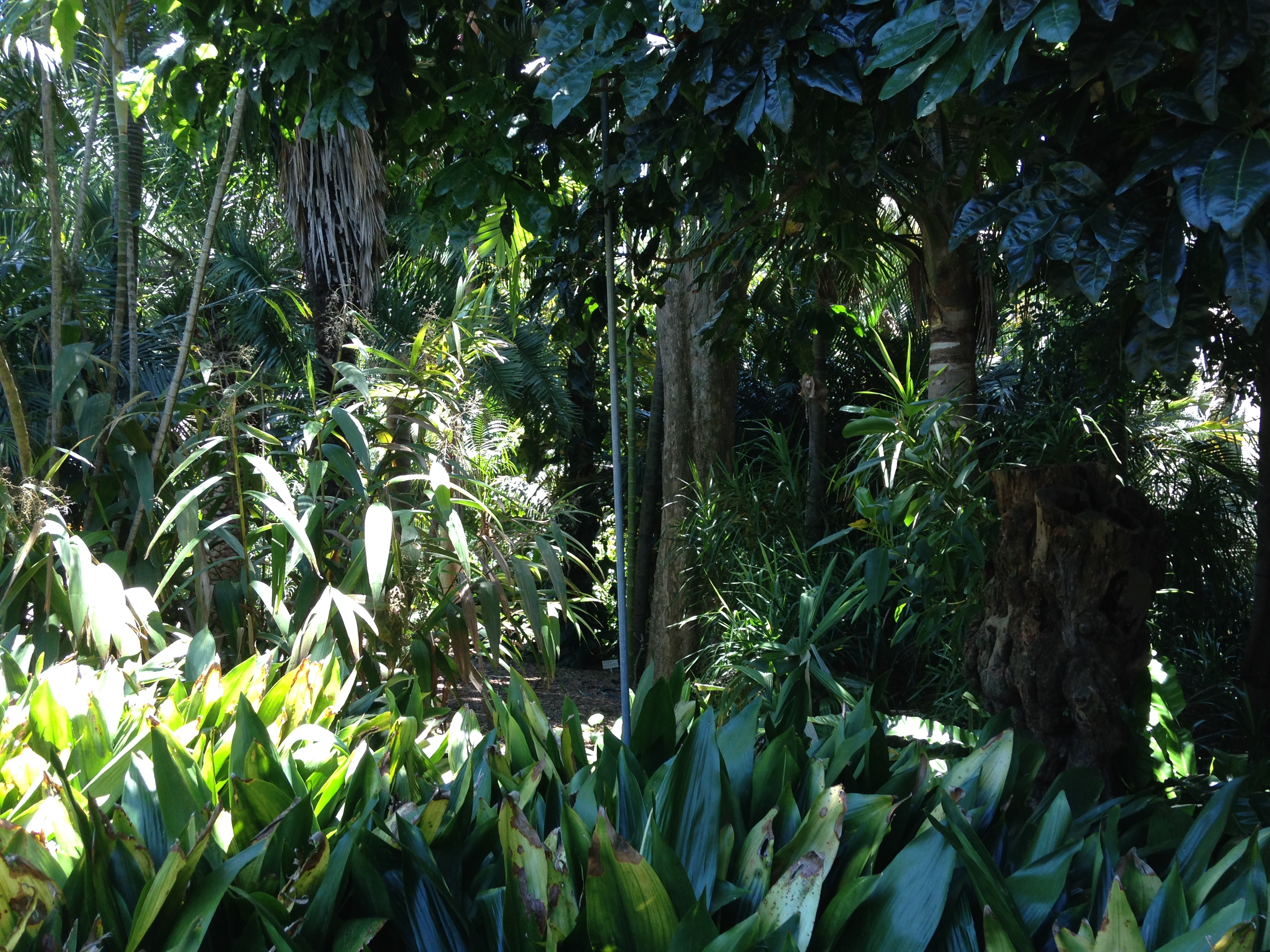
Typical vegetation in the Palm Grove

== Daniel Solander Library ==
The library at the Royal Botanic Gardens was established in 1852. It is named after Daniel Solander (1733–1782) who was a student of Linnaeus and held positions at the British Museum, including working in the library. He was employed in 1768 by Joseph Banks to accompany him on HMS Endeavour on James Cook's first voyage to the Pacific. On their return to England in 1771 he became Banks' botanist and librarian.

The library is the oldest botanical research library in Australia. The library has a collection of horticultural, botanic and taxonomic literature and is located within the National Herbarium of New South Wales which has samples collected by Banks and Solander on the voyage with James Cook amongst more than 1.2 million plant specimens.

== Flying foxes ==
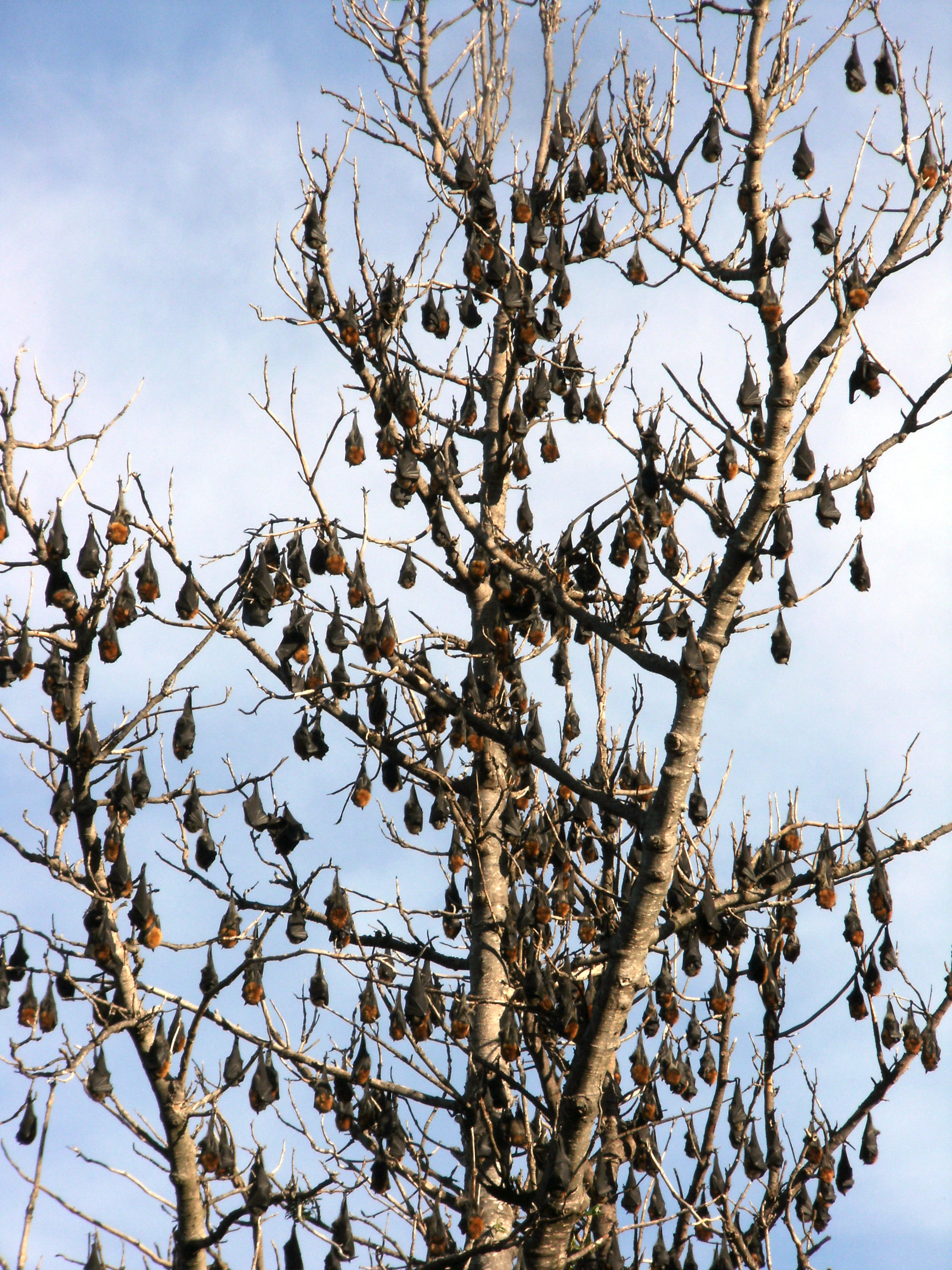
Flying foxes at the Botanic Garden

The Royal Botanic Garden was for decades home to a large colony of native grey-headed flying foxes, a large species of fruit bat. The colony (estimated to be over 20,000 strong at times) caused significant damage to the trees used for roosting, especially around the Palm Grove Centre where dozens of historic trees were killed or severely damaged.

In May 2010, the trust announced a plan to evict the colony from the gardens by driving them away with repeated playing of extremely loud recorded noise. This plan was subsequently held up for several years by court action instigated by an animal welfare group but approval was finally given to the trust to proceed in June 2012. By June 2013 the bats had entirely left the Garden and the damaged trees had started to recover.

In 2014, many of the bats displaced from the garden were found to have moved to a native bushland site on the north coast of New South Wales, which was scheduled to be destroyed for an upgrade of the Pacific Highway, the main road linking Sydney with Brisbane. The destruction of the forest and displacement of that colony became a publicly contentious environment-versus-development issue in early 2014 and the building of the road was delayed pending a court-ordered federal government environmental assessment.

== See also ==
- Australian Botanic Garden Mount Annan
- Auburn Botanic Gardens
- Blue Mountains Botanic Garden
- Macquarie Culvert
- National Herbarium of New South Wales
- The Domain, Sydney
- Parks and gardens of Sydney
- Geography of Sydney
