= Stone Fleet (New South Wales) =

Ships used for industrial purposes in Kiama, Australia

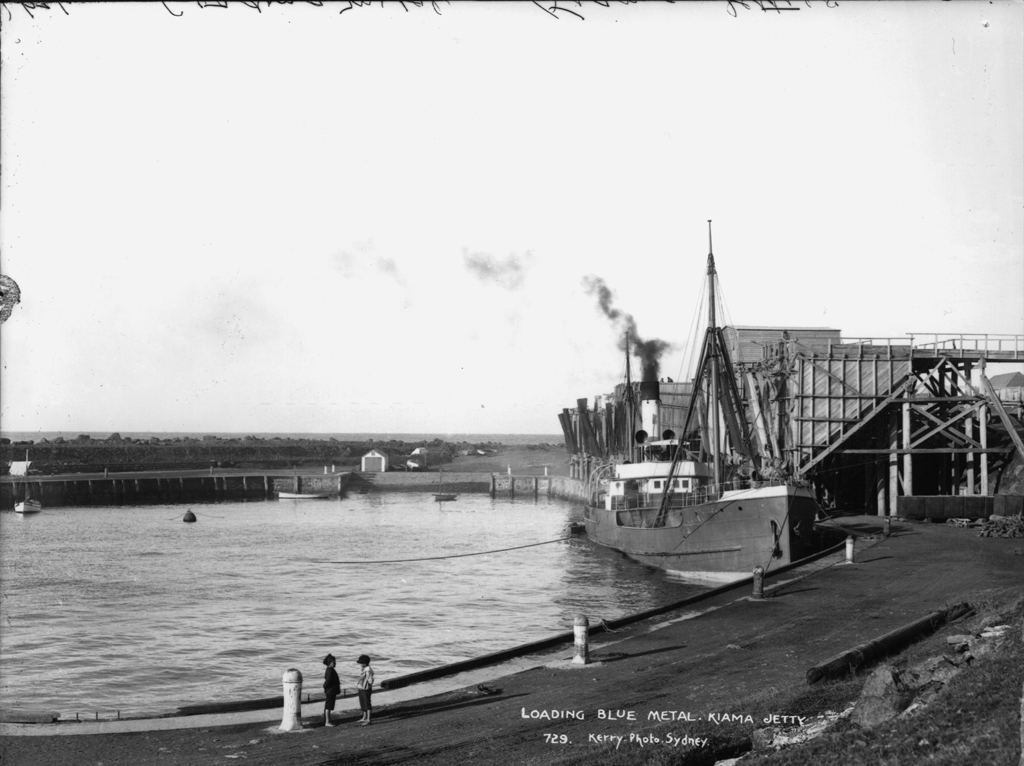
Kiama loading crushed stone at the Robertson Basin, Kiama (unknown date, but between 1902 and 1917)

The Stone Fleet was the colloquial name for the small coastal ships that carried crushed-stone construction aggregate ('blue metal') to Sydney from the Illawarra ports of Kiama and Shellharbour and the nearby ocean jetties at Bombo and Bass Point.

The coastal shipping trade carried on by these ships was known colloquially as the 'Stone Trade' or 'Blue Diamond Trade'. The trade ended finally in 2011.

== The 'Stone Trade' or 'Blue Diamond Trade' ==
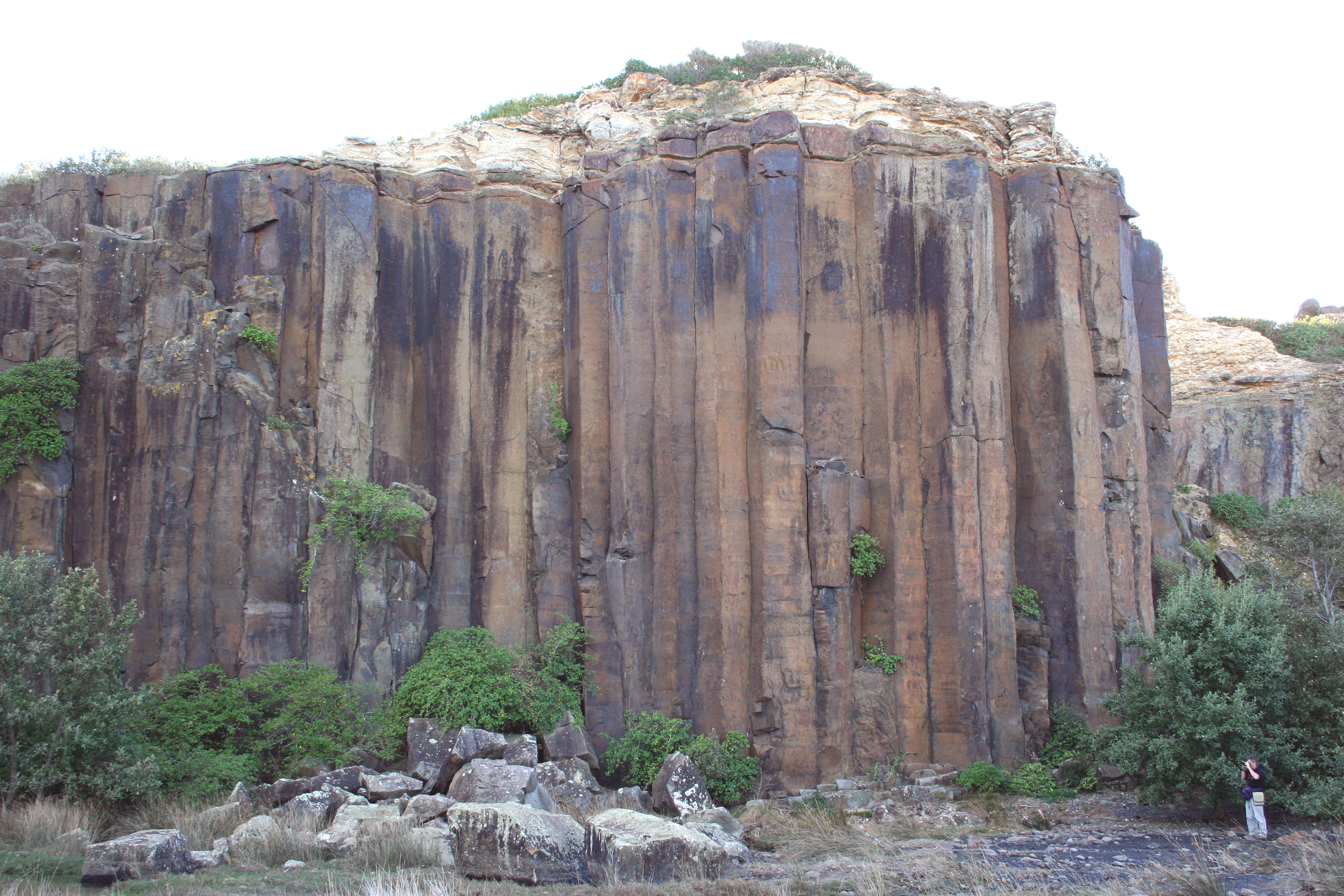
Columnar basalt at Bombo Quarry.

The predominant bedrock in the Sydney metropolitan area is sedimentary rock—Hawkesbury Sandstone with some isolated areas of shale. Crushed stone was needed as aggregate for concrete, road making, and as ballast for railways and tramways. Sandstone and shale are totally unsuited to such purposes, which typically use crushed igneous rock. There are some intrusions of igneous rocks in the Sydney area, particularly at Prospect Hill and Hornsby, but these isolated outcrops, although later quarried, were insufficient to meet demand.

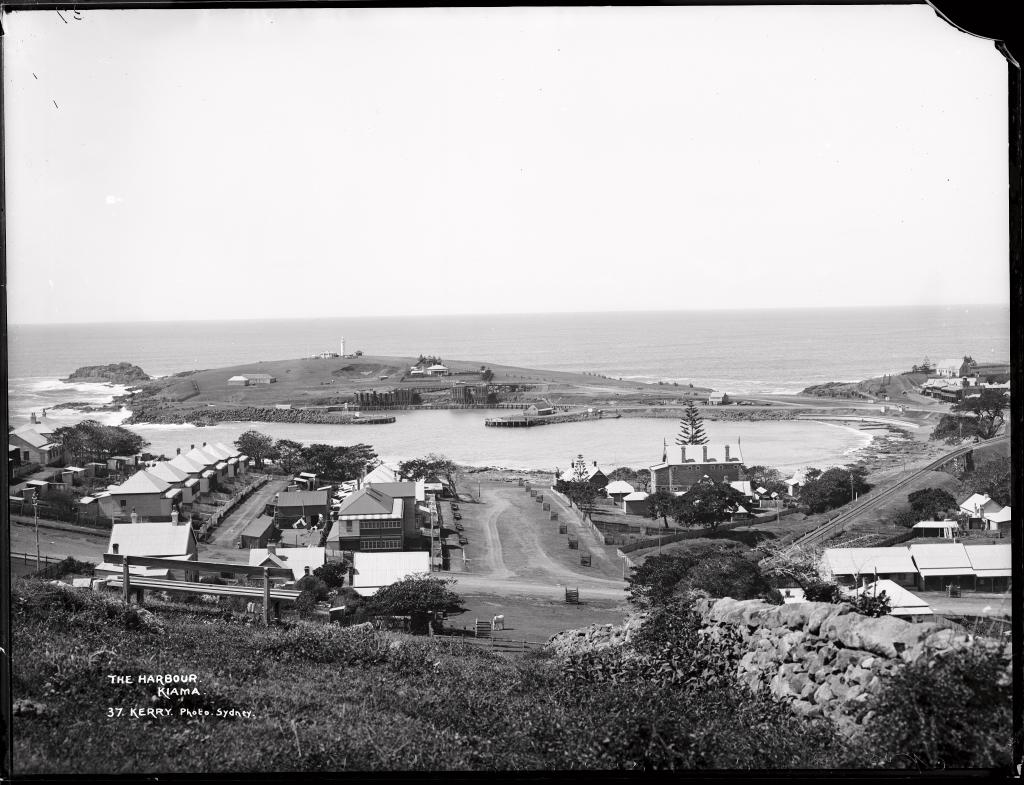
The harbour at Kiama (c. 1905–1917). Photographer Kerry, Charles H., from the Tyrrell Collection of the Powerhouse Museum.

In the southern part of the Illawarra region, south from Sydney, there are extensive igneous rock formations—mainly basalt—stretching from north of Shellharbour to south of Kiama at Gerringong, and extending right to the coastline. Around Kiama, the formations—known as the Gerringong Volcanics—are the result of lava flows from the extinct collapsed volcanic vent known as Saddleback Mountain. It is by far the largest formation of igneous rocks relatively close to Sydney and was well situated to allow transport by sea. The South Coast railway line did not reach Shellharbour (Dunmore) and Bombo until 1887 and it took until 1893 to reach Kiama; by that time, shipping of 'blue metal' by sea was already well established.

After the railway reached the district, significant amounts of the quarried and crushed stone were sent by rail, and some quarries had their own sidings. Coastal shipping remained cost-competitive as a means of transport for many years and the coastal shipping trade in "blue metal" continued, with two lengthy interruptions, until 2011.

Another colloquial name for this trade, the 'Blue Diamond Trade' probably stems from the term 'Black Diamond' used to describe coal, with a similar analogy being applied to 'blue metal', as the quarried and crushed basalt was known colloquially.

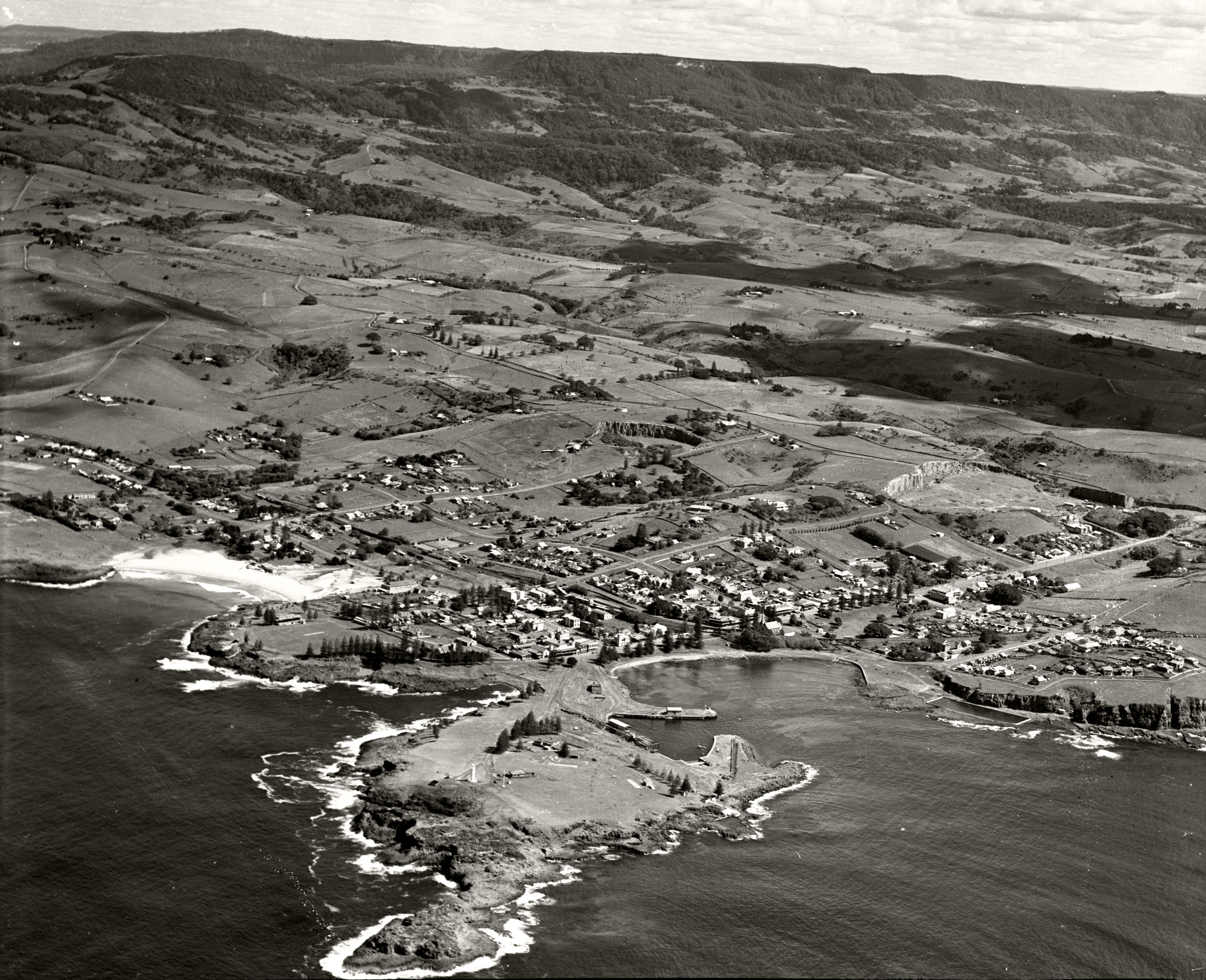
Kiama in 1936. The port is in the front centre and the quarry to right.

=== The ports of the Stone Trade ===
==== Kiama (1881-1942) ====
Kiama was a port of the 'Stone Trade' from around 1881, when the Pike's Hill quarry opened on the outskirts of the town.

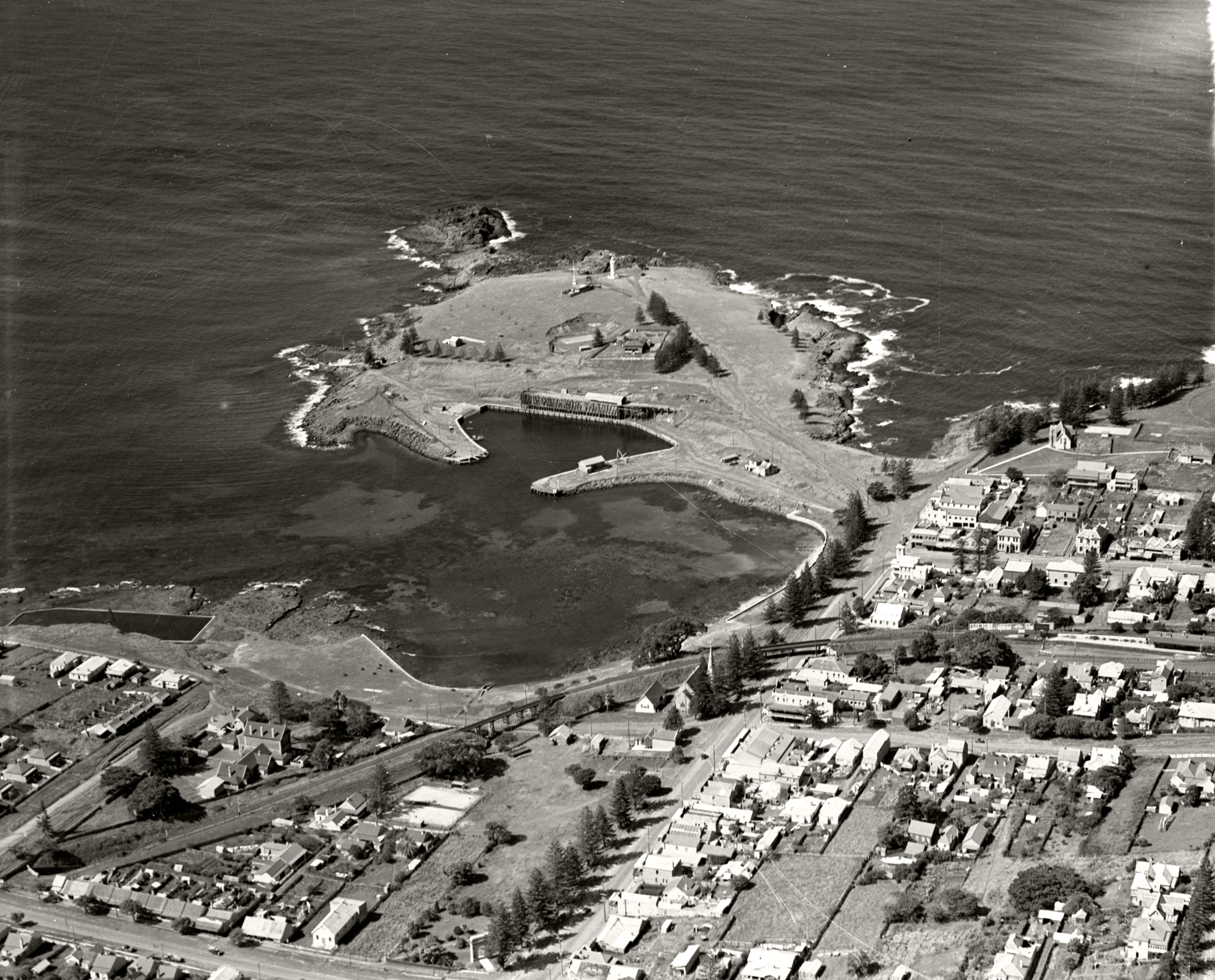
Port of Kiama in 1936 - Robertson Basin, and its hoppers and staiths for shiploading are visible.

The harbour at Kiama relies upon the natural shelter provided by Blowhole Point but is largely artificial. The Robertson Basin was excavated from solid rock between 1871 and 1876. The connection from Blowhole Point to the mainland—previously submerged at high-tide—was raised by adding rock excavated from the basin in 1871. It was also in 1871 that the first commercial shipment of crushed basalt—waste from the excavation of the basin—was made to Sydney. From 1881, there were two staithes for loading crushed stone at the Robertson Basin. From 1887, the port had the Kiama Light as an aid to navigation.

It was difficult for sailing ships to enter Kiama, with a following wind, and not collide with the basin walls or other vessels; this problem was partially solved by placing a heavy chain on the seafloor at the harbour entrance, which ships could use to decelerate by dragging an anchor over it. Ultimately, sail gave way completely to steam, ending the need for this method of shedding speed.

A narrow gauge (2-foot / 610mm) railway line ran from the quarries to the port, via Terralong Street, from 1914 until 1941. Hoppers and staithes for loading crushed stone were located on the eastern side of the Robertson Basin. Until 1936, a branch of the tramway, along Manning Street, also took stone to a set of staiths south of the Kiama railway station, where it was loaded onto wagons for transport by rail.

The quarries at Kiama closed, in 1942, mainly due to 'Stone Fleet' ships being requisitioned by the navy. Operations did not resume until 1947.

Kiama Quarry narrow-gauge railway

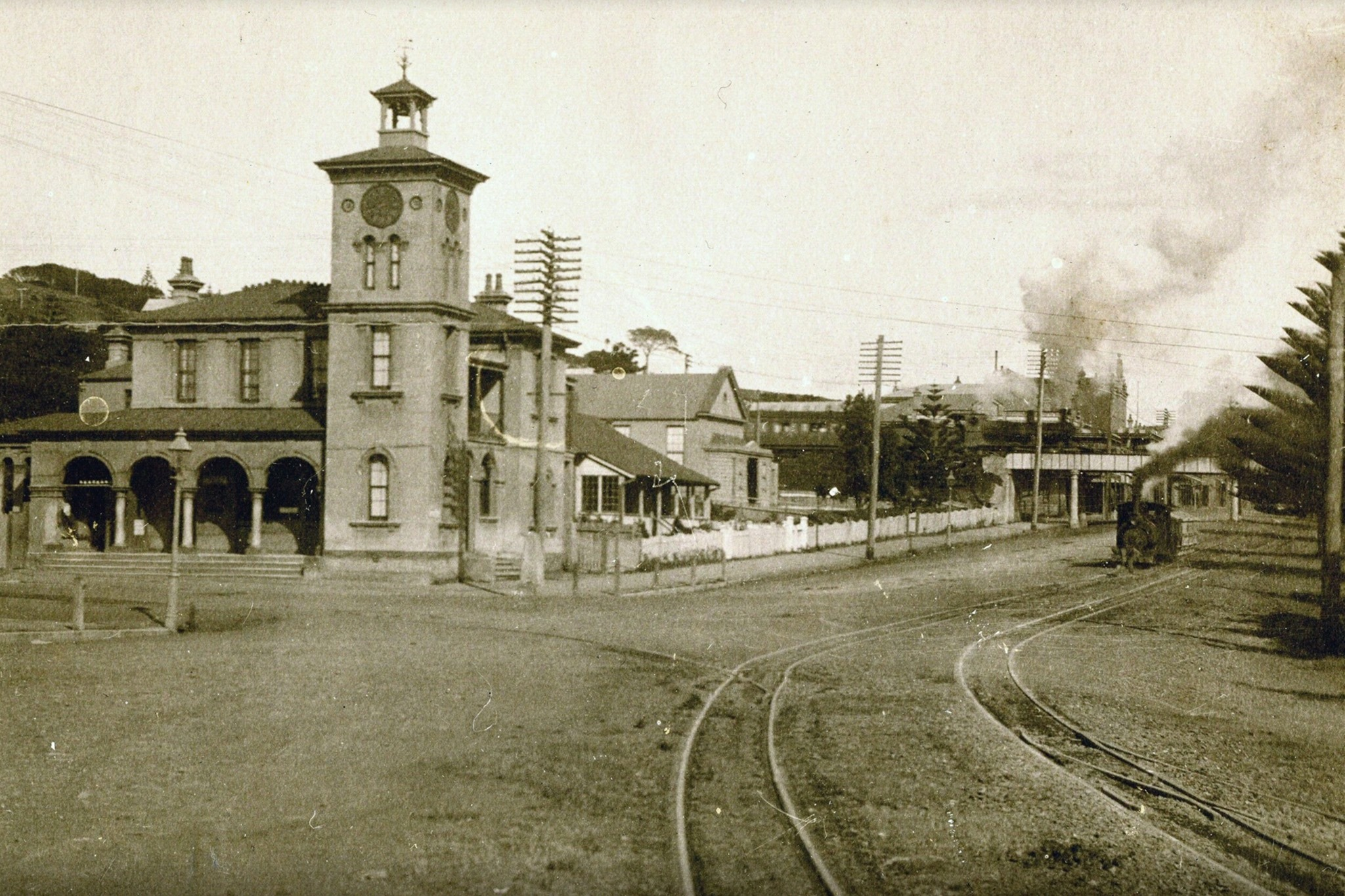
Railway line from quarry to port, near Kiama Post Office with South Coast line at rear.

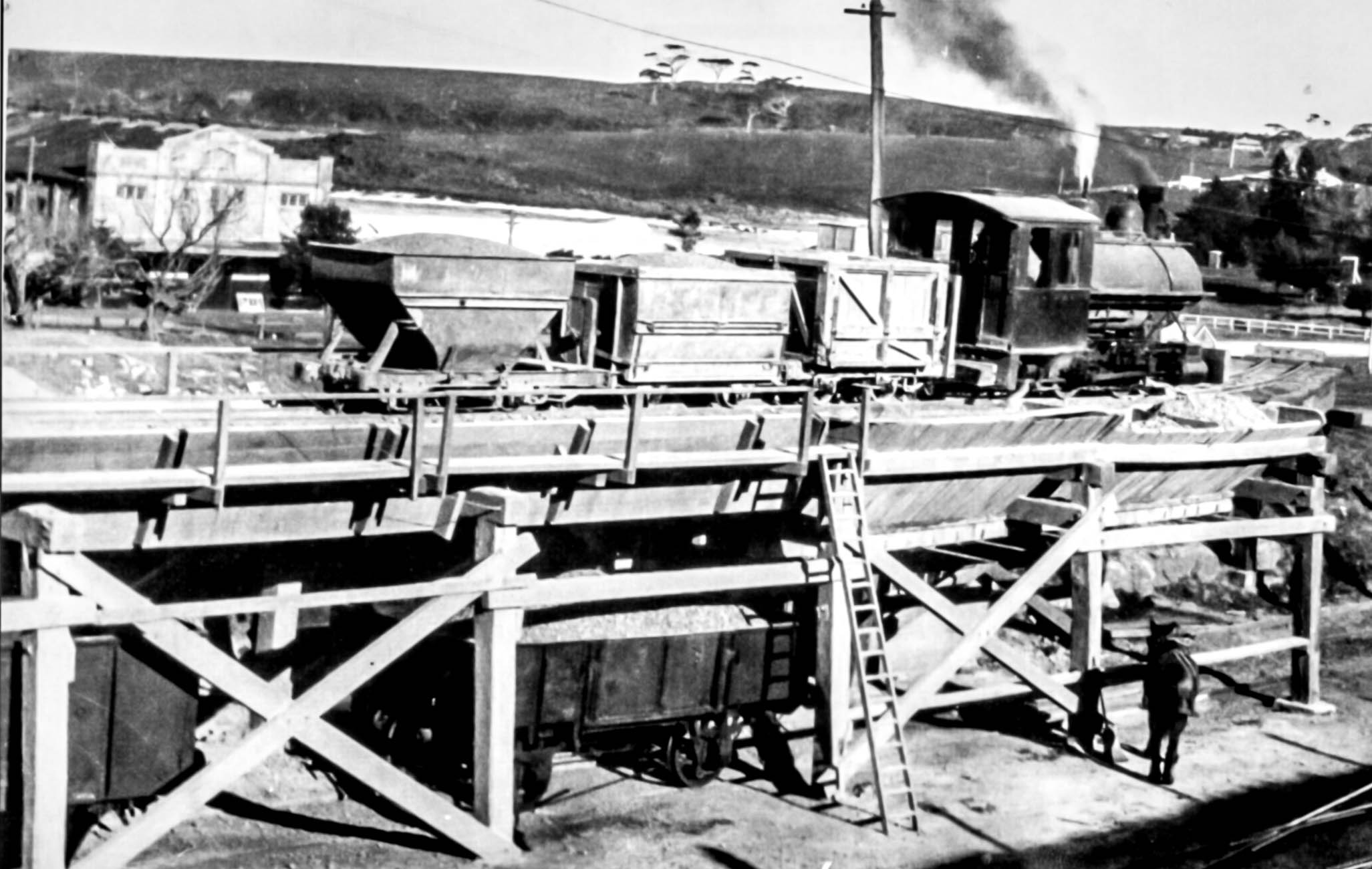
Train unloading to NSWGR rail wagons. The locomotive, 'Kiama', has been preserved.

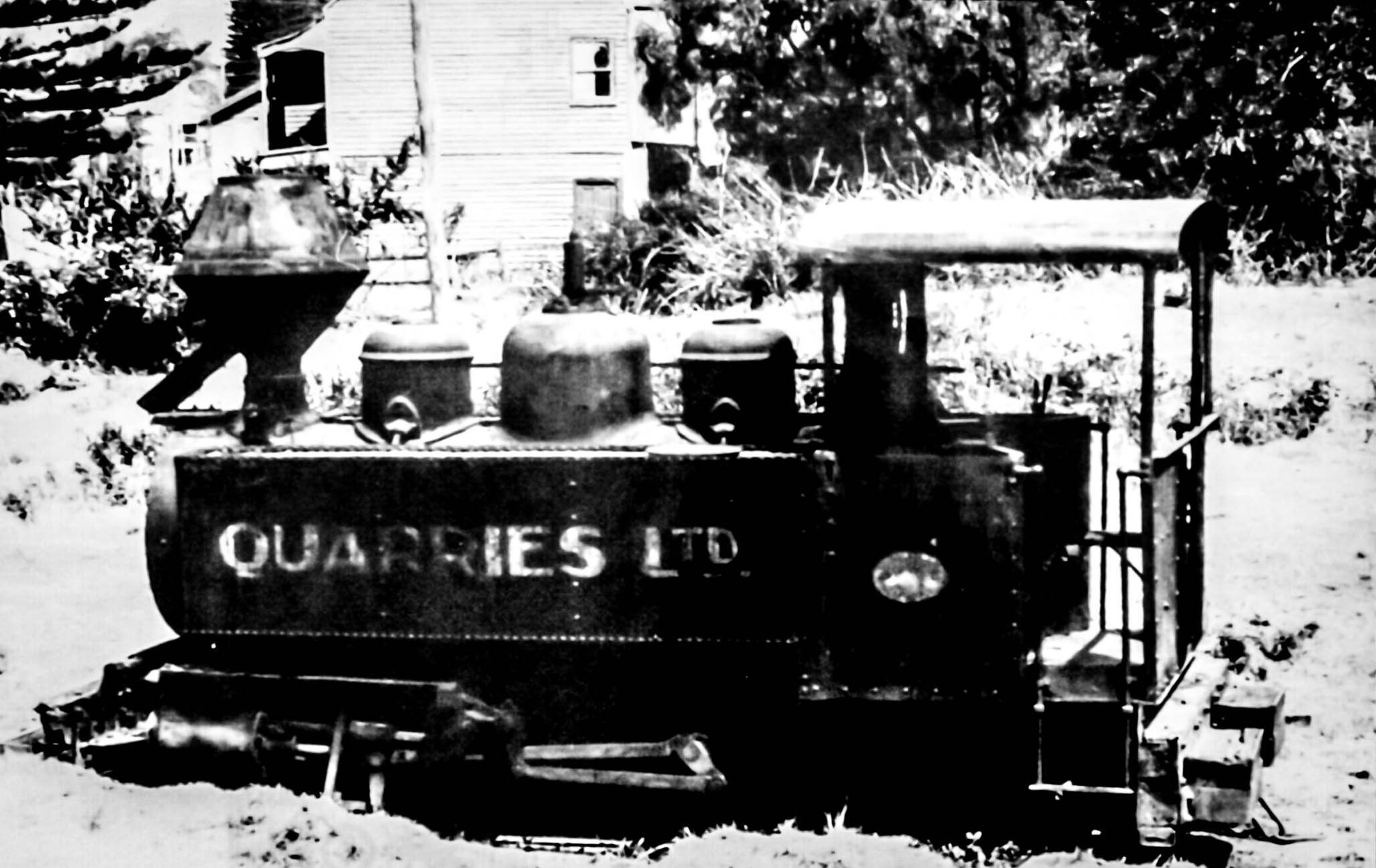
Fowler locomotive.

==== Bombo ====
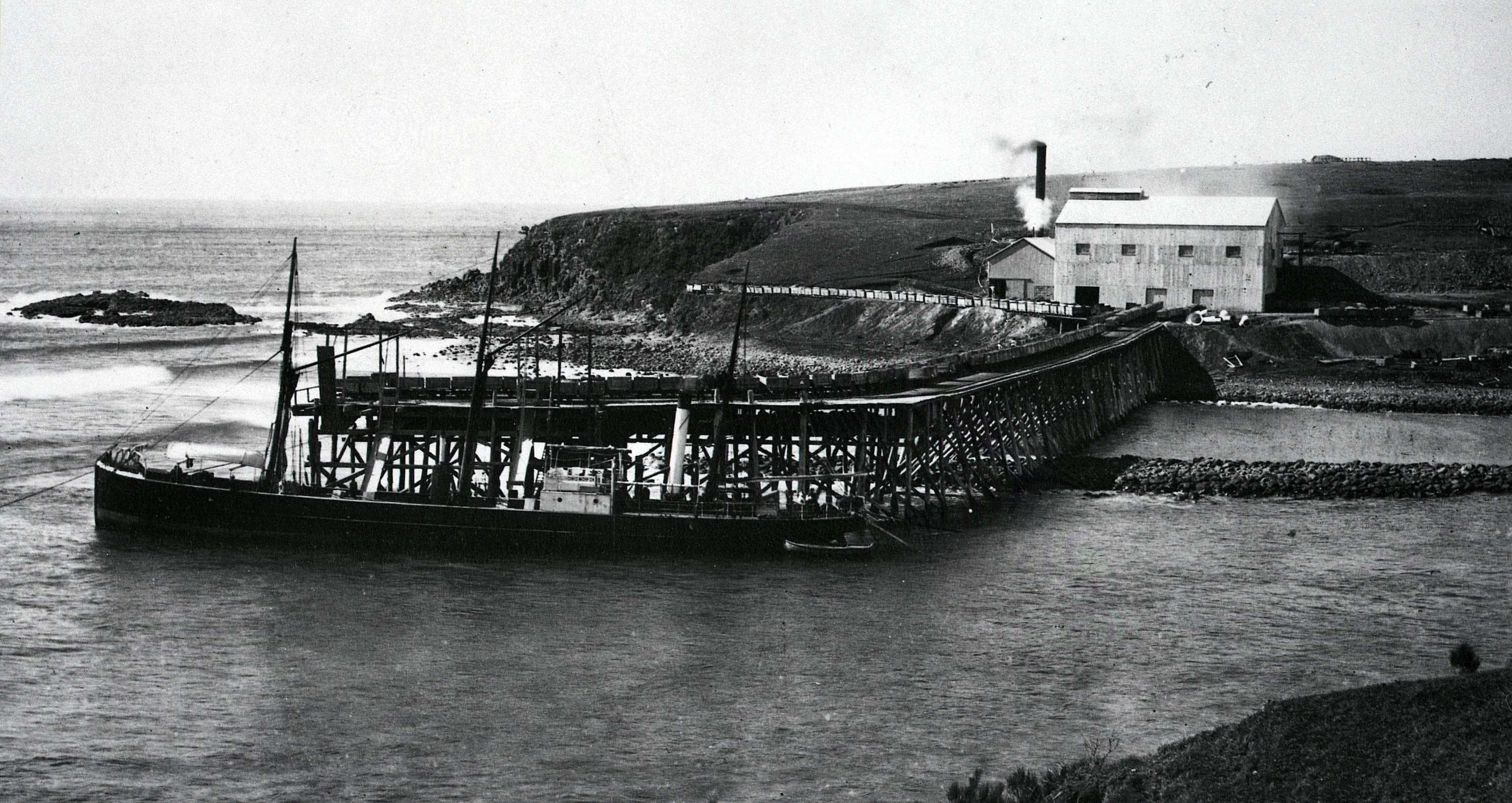
Bombo Jetty in the 1880s with an unidentified, three-mast, 'Stone Fleet' steamer. The crushing plant is on the right. (Kiama Library)

Bombo was the site of an ocean jetty for the nearby headland quarry. The jetty was on the north side of Bombo Point. Bombo was more exposed to the weather than Kiama and a less reliable port as a result. Stone from the quarry was crushed and then carried in rail wagons onto the wharf, where it was loaded onto ships using any of three chutes. The crushers and jetty were capable of shipping 3,000 tones of crushed stone per week in 1885.

The jetty only operated from 1883 until 1889. The arrival of the railway in 1887 and the acquisition of the quarry by the NSW Government Railways in 1889 made the jetty redundant. Ships known to have used the jetty during its brief operational life included, Lass o' Gowrie, Resolute, and Civility.

==== Shellharbour ====
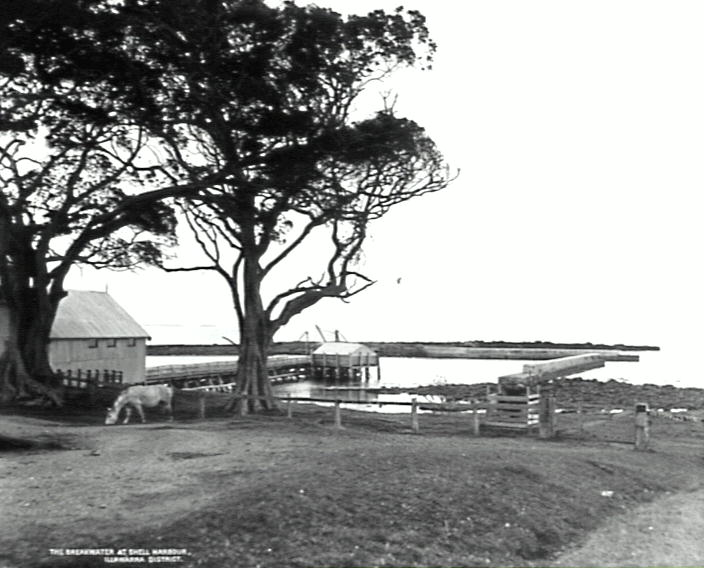
Port at Shellharbour in 1898. (RAHS Collection)

Blue metal was loaded at times at the small coastal-shipping port at Shellharbour, although it was better known as a port for agricultural products. It was a difficult port to navigate, used only by small craft—such as Paterson —and masters who had local knowledge. There was a small jetty there by the end of the 1850s. A larger jetty was constructed in the late 1860s. Although receiving some protection from Bass Point to the south and Cowrie Island to north, the Shellharbour jetty was exposed to heavy seas from the east or north-east.

An artificial harbour was constructed in the 1880s, with one breakwater running for 100 yards In a north-easterly direction and another to the south-east for 50 yards—from Cowrie Island—providing an entrance only 100 feet wide, with a depth of six feet of water. The breakwater was extended westward around 1899, to block completely the gap between Cowrie Island and the mainland.

The jetty ran from the south-east corner of the basin, for 50 yards to the north-east. There was only one berth on the north-west side of the jetty, with from five to seven feet of water at low tide. A 'swinging buoy' was used when berthing vessels that had to head north-east as they went alongside. There was also a smaller, high wharf on the northern side of the basin, near the site of the modern-day boat ramp.

The port remained in operation during the years that the Bass Point jetty was out of action, 1922 to 1927, following storm damage. The South Coast Metal Company had a wharf there in 1924.

==== Bass Point (near Shellharbour) ====
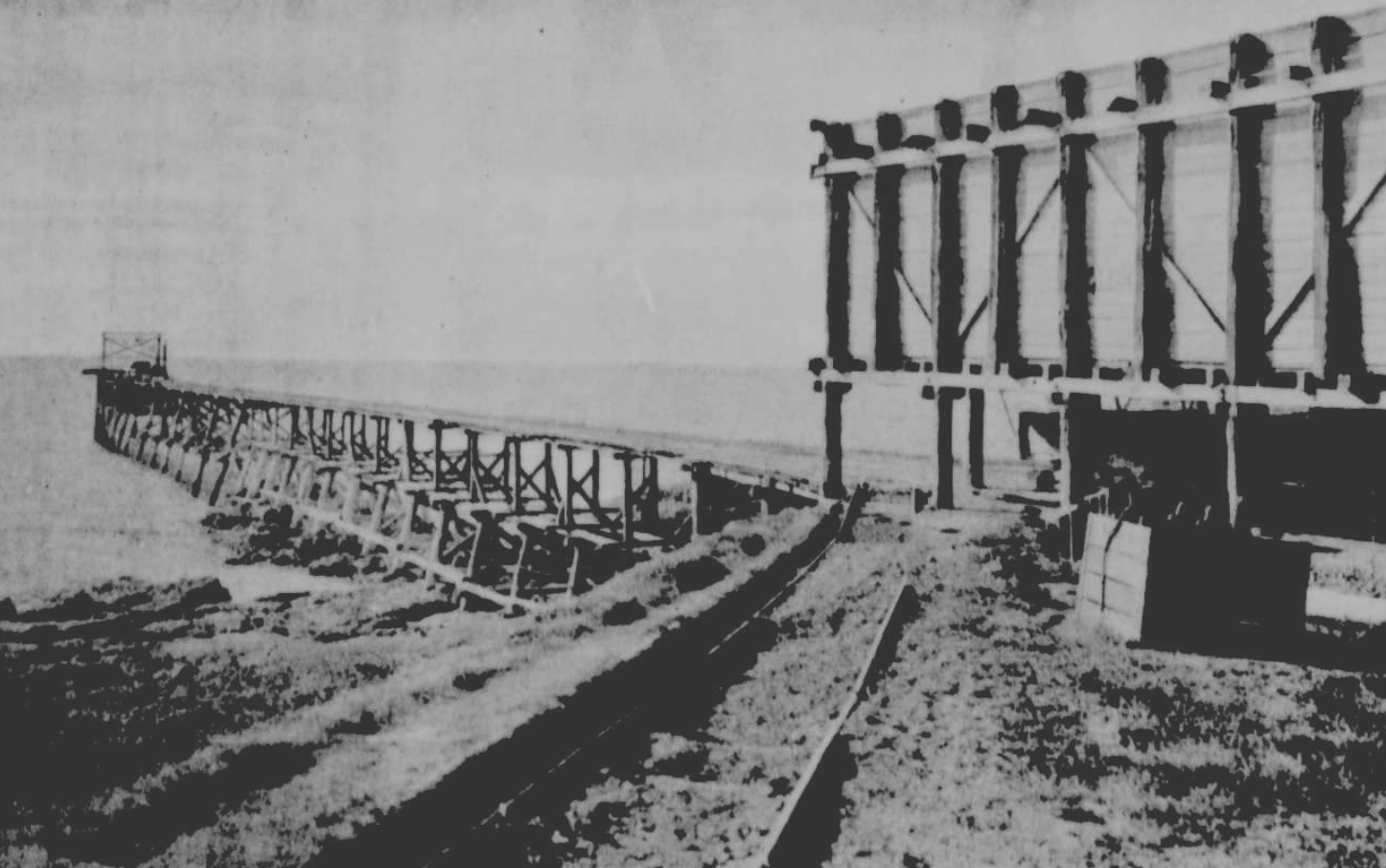
Hoppers and jetty at Bass Point, then also known as Long Point (c.1904)

A wooden jetty was constructed around 1880 at Bass Point—an area also known in those times as 'Long Point'—to load crushed stone from an adjacent quarry. The jetty was 500 feet long. In 1904, Dunmore was berthing here four times a week, and each time would load 300 tons, in under two hours. The jetty was badly damaged by storms in 1922 and, although it eventually was repaired, did not reopen until 1927. The jetty closed during the Second World War and did not resume operation after the war. It survived until 1957, when it was damaged in bad weather; its remains were demolished in 1958.

The existing jetty and its loader were completed in 1973. It could load a ship at a rate of 900 tonnes per hour. Bass Point was the last port of the 'Stone Fleet', closing in 2011.

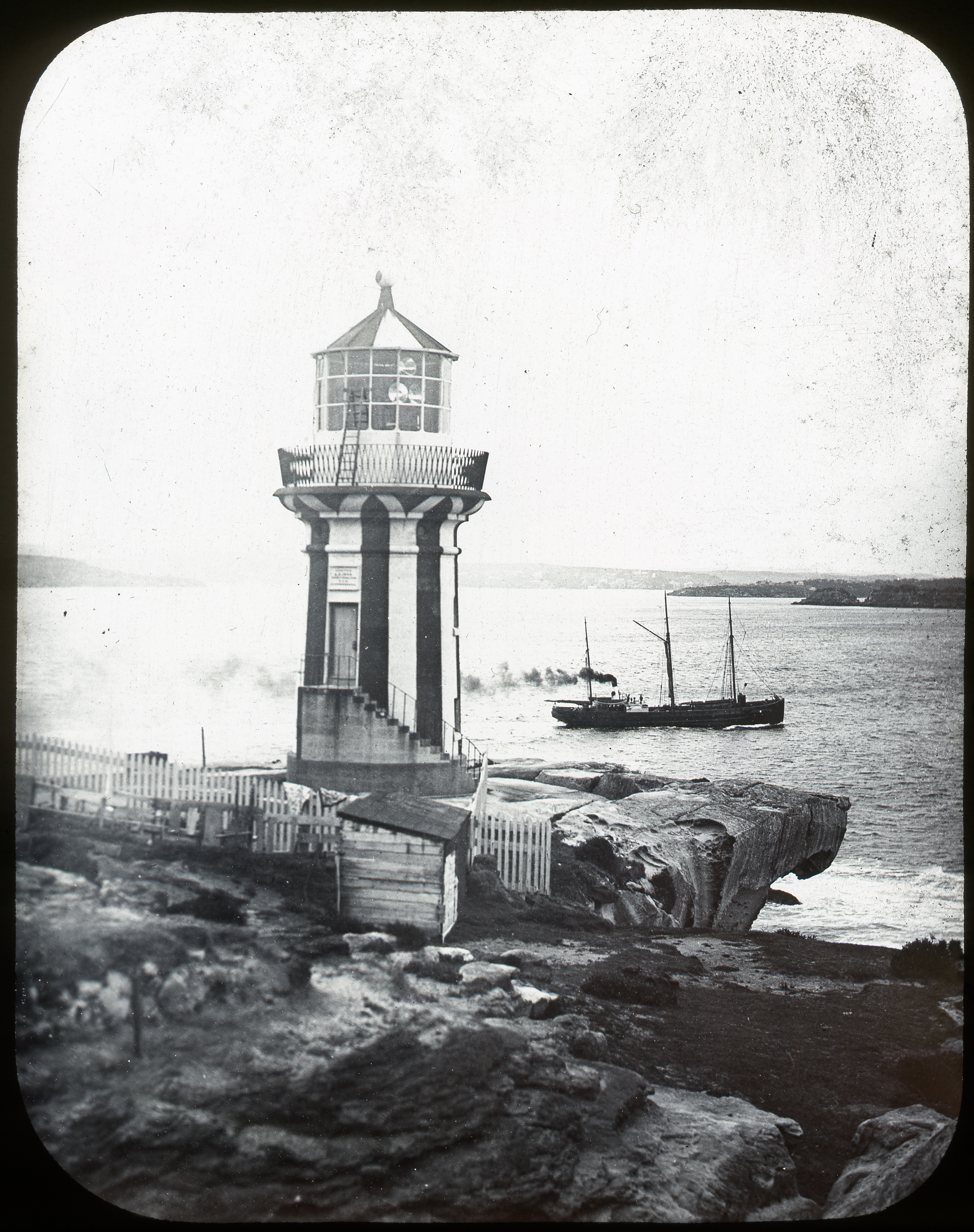
Lass o' Gowrie passing the Hornby Light, during the 1880s.(W. Hardwood, City of Sydney Archives)

==== Sydney Harbour (Pyrmont, Woolloomooloo and Blackwattle Bay) ====
The first shipment of gravel from Kiama arrived at Sydney in 1871.

In the early 20th Century, 'blue metal' was unloaded at Pyrmont, by gangs of men in a similar way to 'coal lumping'. This was dangerous work.

There was a wharf for unloading 'blue metal', Berth No.8, at the south-western corner of Woolloomooloo Bay, by 1907. During the 1930s, Blue Metal and Gravel Company Pty Ltd had discharge hoppers at Woolloomooloo and 'blue metal' was unloaded there.

By 1902, 'Blue metal' was unloaded at wharves at the head of Blackwattle Bay in Sydney Harbour. From 1972, this facility was owned by Hanson. In its last decade, Blackwattle Bay was unloading 380,000 tonnes of crushed stone per annum. Part of the facility, the concrete batching plant, was still operating in 2019, but ships no longer unloaded there. It has since been demolished to clear a part of the site of the new Sydney Fish Market redevelopment.

== The fleet ==
=== The ships ===
In the earliest years of the coastal trade, the "Stone Fleet" ships were sailing vessels. These were quickly supplanted by small coal-fired steamers designed to carry bulk cargo. The steamers in the earlier years of the trade were relatively small, wooden ships, like Civility, built in 1872, Dunmore, built in 1891—both from the Rock Davis shipyard—and Resolute, built in New Zealand in 1883. Another wooden steamer used in the stone trade was Kiltobranks, built in 1908 by the Rock Davis yard. These early steamships were, in turn, superseded gradually, by somewhat larger steel-hulled vessels, from around 1900 onwards. An exception to the wooden ships was the iron-hulled Lass o' Gowrie, built in Scotland in 1878.

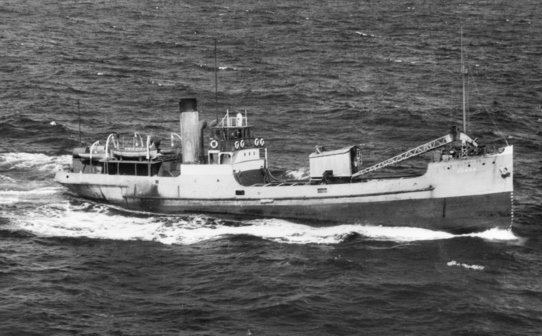
SS Bombo in 1939

The first steel-hulled vessel was the (first) Kiama, built in Glasgow and delivered in late 1902; she replaced Civiility. In mid 1918, Dunmore left the coastal trade and was used for the interstate trade. Another steel vessel, Bombo was delivered in 1930. Both came out from Scotland to Kiama, under their own power. However, surviving wooden-hulled steamers, such as Paterson and Belbowrie continued to carry crushed stone during the inter-war period. Paterson was the last wooden-hulled vessel of the "Stone Fleet".

Throughout the period of the stone trade, certain names were reused for later ships; Dunmore (two ships, 1891 and 1951) and Kiama (two ships 1902 and 1950). There was an earlier Kiama, during the later years of the 19th Century, but she was a coastal paddle steamer of the Illawarra Steam Navigation Company. She was used on the South Coast, up to 1896, but not to carry stone.

There was also a similar type of small bulk cargo ship, usually dedicated to carrying coal, known as a 'sixty-miler'. Some 'sixty miler' ships carried construction aggregate from time to time. 'Stone Fleet' ships would occasionally carry coal, as part of the coastal coal-carrying trade. Given the density of their cargo, 'Stone Fleet' ships were smaller and had relatively smaller holds than the typical 'sixty-miler' designed to carry coal.

The last ship of the 'Stone Fleet', the self-discharging bulk carrier MV Claudia, was much larger and faster than the earlier vessels. The ship had three separate holds and could handle three different materials in any one trip, with a total capacity of 3,800 tonnes.

=== The ship owners ===
==== Early owners ====
Civility was built to the order of William Short of the Baltic Wharf, Sydney, in 1872, originally destined for the Richmond River trade. By 1886, she was owned by George Hill, who was the proprietor of the quarry at Bombo. After the Bombo quarry was sold to the NSW Railways in 1889, she remained in the stone trade, working from Kiama. She was replaced by (first) Kiama in late 1902. Lass o' Gowrie was owned by George Hill, proprietor of the quarry at Bombo, until she was sold to Howard Smith, in 1896, and went to work on the Queensland coast. Resolute was owned by Justin McSweeney, during the time that she was a stone carrier.

==== Fuller family ====
Dunmore (first) was owned by the Fuller family (G.L. Fuller & Sons), operators of the quarry at Bass Point (then known as Long Point), and remained owned by them during her working life. Dunmore, County Galway was the birthplace of George Lawrence Fuller (1832—1917).

==== Kiama Road Metal Company & NSW Government ====
Kiama (first) was originally owned by Kiama Road Metal Company, which operated the quarry at Kiama. When the quarry was sold to the NSW Government, in 1911, Kiama was included in the assets sold. The government sold her to Bellambi Coal Company Ltd, operators of the South Bulli Colliery, in 1932. After her time owned by George Hill, Civility was bought by Kiama Road Metal Company, and remained owned by them until sold around 1908.

==== H.R. Lancey ====
Bombo was owned by the H. R. Lancey Shipping Co. Kiama (second), ex-Holmlea, was bought by the H. R. Lancey Shipping Co. from Holm & Co., in 1950. Paterson was originally built for the Hunter River Steamship Company and delivered in 1920. She was owned by H. R. Lancey Shipping Co., by 1938 and up to the end of 1947. She was then the personal property of Captain H. R Lancey, principal shareholder of the company bearing his name. In 1951, two ships were bought by the Lancey Shipping Company, MV Dunmore (ex-Nassau), the second Dunmore, and MV Bass Point (ex-Betoeran), for the run from Kiama to Sydney.

==== Pioneer Concrete ====
MV Claudia, the last 'Stone Fleet' ship, was owned by Pioneer Concrete. She carried the flag of Barbados.

== Decline, revival, and end of the 'Stone Fleet' ==
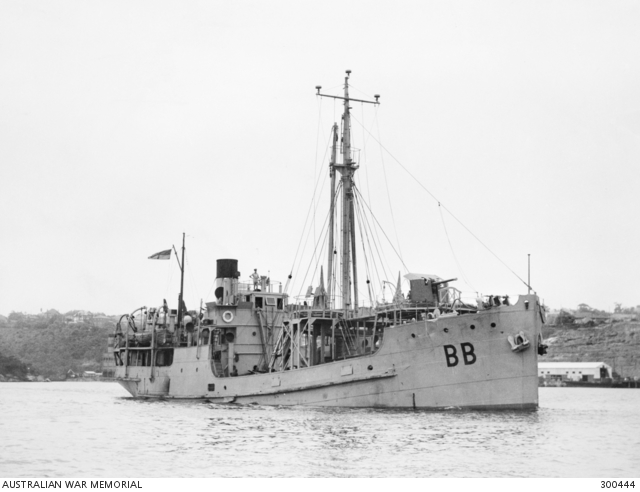
HMAS Bombo in Sydney, after her conversion to a minesweeper. (Australian War Memorial.)

=== Impact of the Second World War ===
There was an interruption to the trade during the Second World War, when Paterson and Bombo were requisitioned for wartime service. The quarries and narrow-gauge railway at Kiama closed permanently at this time. Around the same time, the Bass Point quarry and jetty also closed.

Bombo and Paterson were used as minesweepers during the war. Unlike HMAS Bombo and HMAS Paterson, HMAS Kiama was not a repurposed existing ship, but was a new vessel, launched in 1943, one of 60 Bathurst-class corvettes built during the war years. The coastal steamer Kiama had been sold to Bellambi Coal in 1932, to become a 'sixty-miler' coastal collier, but in 1938 she had been hulked; she became a coal hulk, on Sydney Harbour, named C597A, and finally was scrapped in 1960.

Loading at Bass Point did not resume after the war, and its disused jetty was destroyed in a storm in 1957.

=== Post-war operations at Kiama (1947-1961) ===
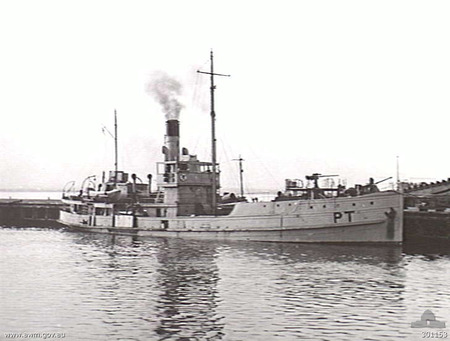
HMAS Paterson in wartime service (Australian War Memorial)

After the war, the trade resumed but ground had been lost to road and rail transport. Kiama became, once again, a port for loading 'blue metal' but now it was brought from nearby quarries to the port by road transport.

Bomboand Paterson survived the war—Bombo was on the Kiama to Sydney run by the end of September 1947, but the two ships were lost in incidents in the following years; Bombo in 1949 and Paterson in 1951. The first Kiama was a coal hulk, by 1950, and in that year a New Zealand coastal collier, Holmlea, previously Parera until 1936, was renamed Kiama and put on to replace Bombo. That second ship known as Kiama was also lost, in 1951.

A new steel-hulled MV Dunmore (ex-Nassau) entered service in 1951, with Kiama as its home port. There was another ship, still at work in 1959, MV Bass Point (ex-Betoeran), which—like MV Dunmore (ex-Nassau)—was formerly a Dutch East Indies oil tanker.

171,829 tons of gravel was shipped by sea from Kiama Harbour—vessels making 242 trips—during the 1956–57 financial year.

=== End of Kiama port operations ===
In 1960, the N.S.W. Government reduced the rail freight charge for 'blue metal' carried from Port Kembla, from 36 shillings per ton to 15 shillings per ton, effectively making the shipping operations at Kiama uneconomic.

MV Dunmore took the last shipment of 'blue metal' from Kiama on 21 December 1961, then became redundant. She was sold (c. 1962–1963) and renamed Fijian Trader, under which name she ran aground and was wrecked in 1964. The hoppers at the Robertson Basin were demolished in 1965.

=== Reopening of Bass Point and final years (1973—2011) ===
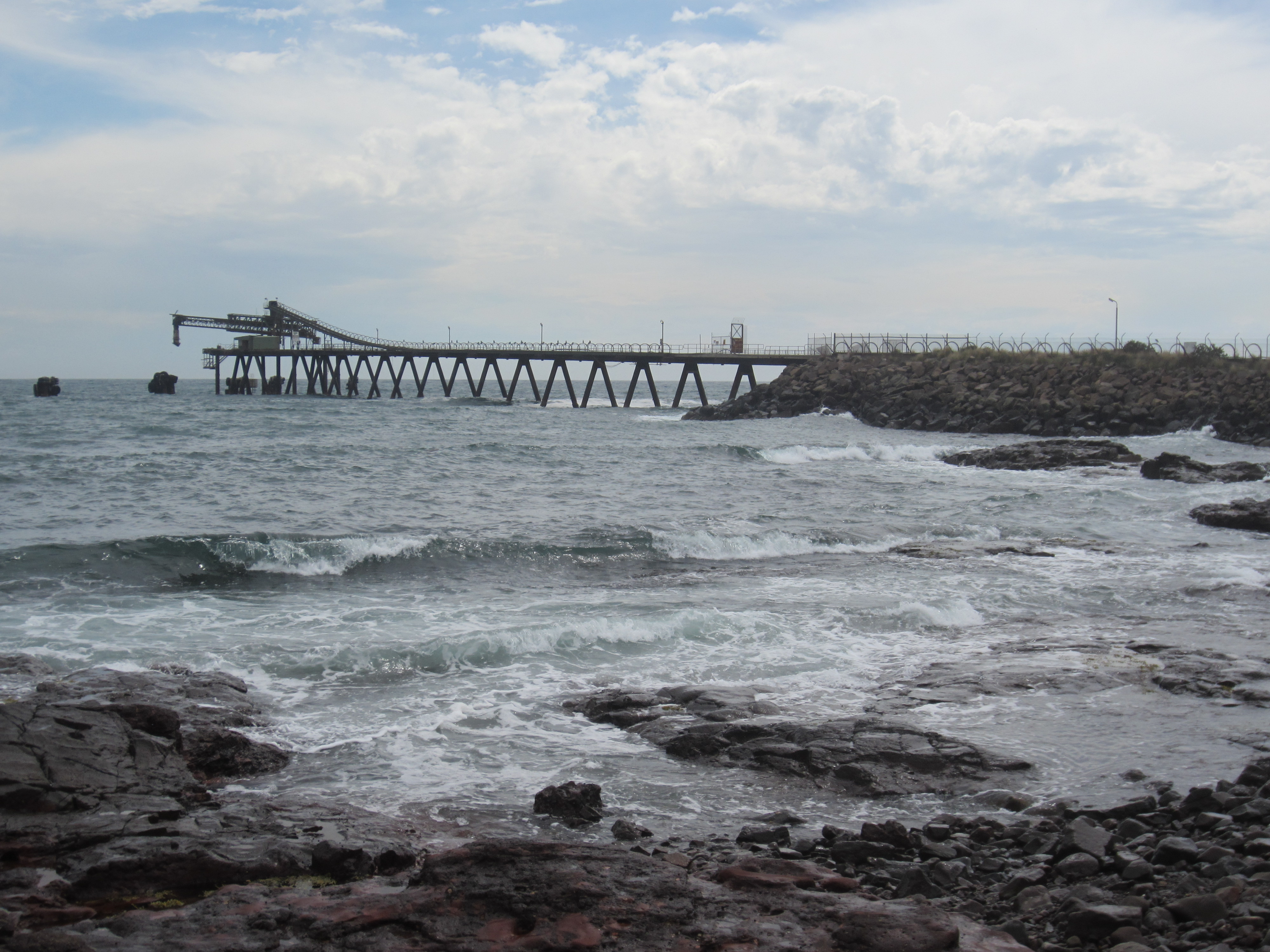
Disused gravel loader at Bass Point, taken in November 2020.

The Bass Point quarry reopened in 1973 using a new jetty and loader, referred to locally as 'the gravel loader'. Thus began what would be the final phase of the Stone Trade. With the older Stone Fleet ships all gone by then, the trade at the new Bass Point jetty used ex-'sixty-miler' colliers, like Hexham Bank, which were available after the end of gas production from coal. In 1977, the ex-collier Lisa Miller was used on the run.

Shipping by sea remained an attractive option, both economically and environmentally, relative to both road and rail transport.

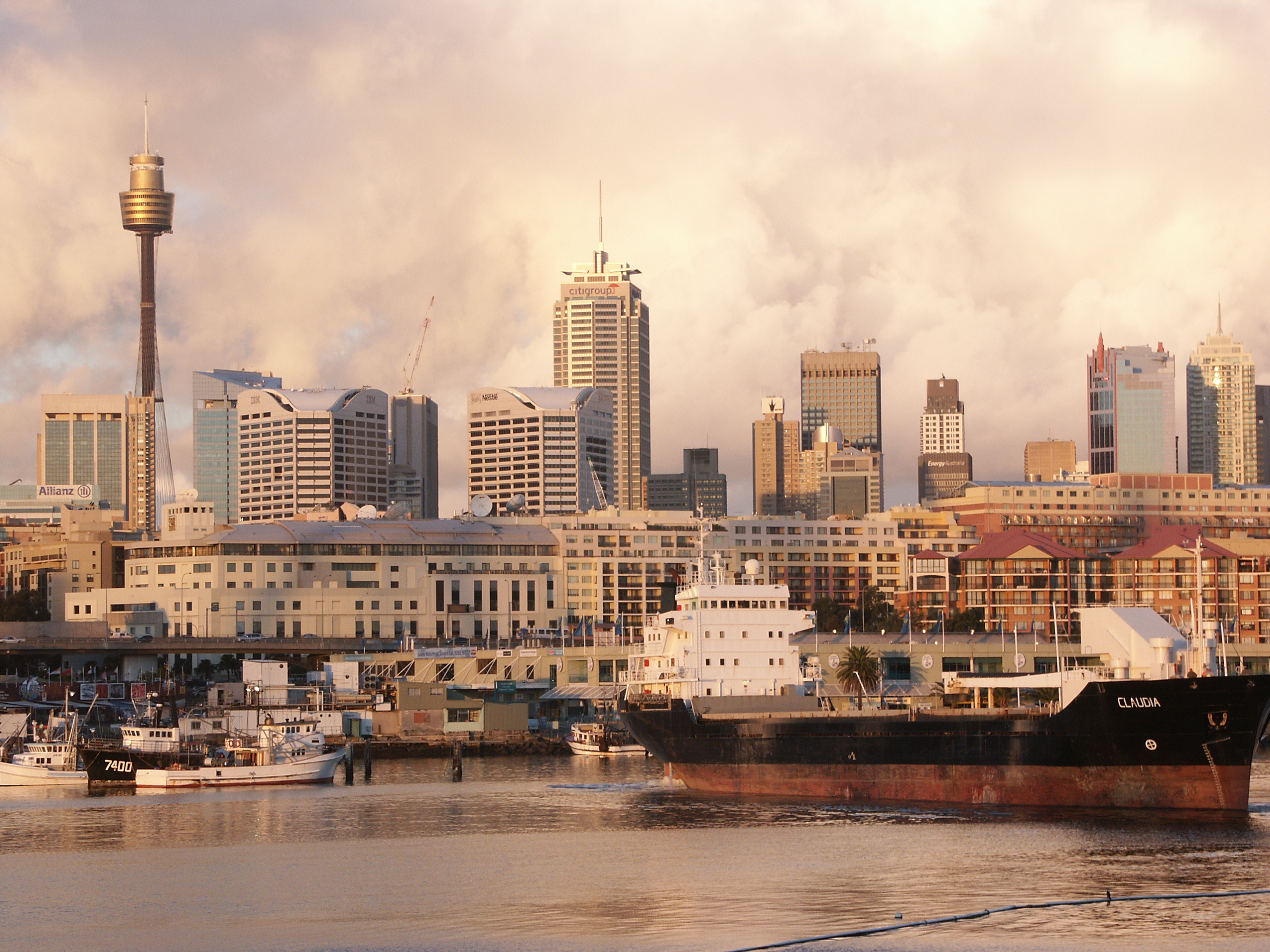
Claudia, the last 'Stone Fleet' ship, in Blackwattle Bay, July 2004 (Patricia Baillie, City of Sydney Archives)

The new operation at Bass Point and the use of a larger ship, MV Claudia, resulted in the last years of the trade achieving the highest shipments. Over 14 years, MV Claudia delivered over 2.8 million tonnes of aggregate to the Sydney. Three times a week, she made the return journey from Blackwattle Bay Concrete Plant to Bass Point, loading at the Bass Point Jetty, with 3,800 tonnes of crushed basalt carried by conveyors direct from the Bass Point Quarry. Each trip that MV Claudia made was the equivalent of 100 truck movements through the Sydney area.

MV Claudia was retired in 2011, finally ending the "Blue Diamond" or "Stone" coastal-shipping trade. She was sent to be scrapped in China. All transport from Bass Point is now by road.

== Incidents and losses ==
=== Early years ===
Over the years of the 'Stone Trade', many ships of the Stone Fleet were wrecked, involved in collisions with other ships, or foundered. Many sailing vessels were lost in the earlier period of the 'Stone Trade'.

In 1881, the schooners Industry and Mary Peverley where both attempting to enter port at Kiama, with a strong north-east wind blowing. The Industry 'missed the chain', and ran into the stone wharf. Mary Peverley managed to drag a second anchor over the chain, narrowly avoiding collision with another schooner, Prima Donna. Prima Donna later foundered and capsized, in a squall off Bondi in 1882, with the loss of six of her seven crew.

in 1894, the Bowra—a wooden steamer that had been put on the Kiama run in 1893 assisting the Resolute— sprang a leak near Seal Rocks, while carrying coal to the Clarence from Newcastle, and foundered, without loss of life.

=== Civility ===
The wooden-hull steamer Civility collided with Illawarra, off Kiama, in August 1881, You Yang in January 1886—after which she sank off Bradleys Head but was apparently refloated—and Vision in July 1902. After being replaced by (first) Kiama in late 1902, she was first used as a sixty-miler collier and on the run to the North Coast. Later, she was a collier on the Queensland coast, carried ironstone for the Mount Morgan smelters, and, from 1911, was a coal hulk in Brisbane, eventually being broken up in 1918.

=== Lass o' Gowrie ===
In January 1884, Lass o' Gowrie, after running in ballast from Sydney to Bombo, struck a rock while standing off Bombo waiting for Civility to leave the jetty. Later, carrying stone from Bombo in 1885, she collided, at night, with the steamer Glaucus off Bradley's Head in Sydney Harbour. Both times, she was run aground to prevent her sinking. Lass 'o Gowrie was to have a long and eventful life. She was sold to Howard Smith, in 1896, gutted and refitted with new machinery, and then put to work on the Queensland coast. She remained working there, until at least the mid 1920s, and even later as a lighter. In 1975, she as scuttled at Hervey Bay.

=== Resolute ===
In July 1894, the small wooden steamer Resolute, out of Kiama, sprang a leak off Five Islands and was saved by being beached In Wollongong Harbour. She was refloated and her cargo of 'blue metal' offloaded at Wollongong.

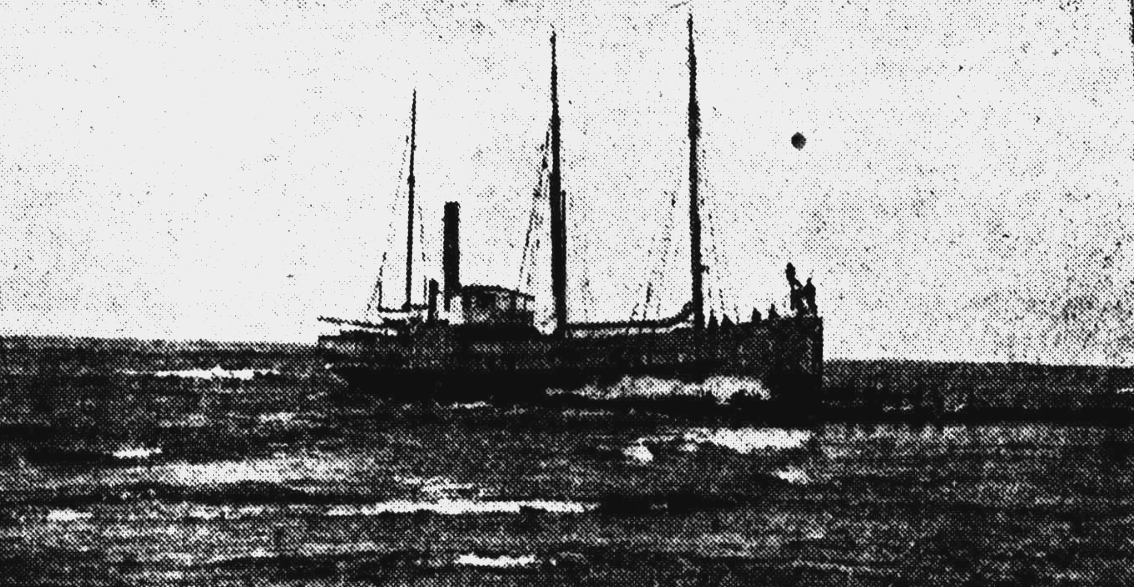
Resolute aground on Bellambi Reef, before she broke up (July 1907). .

Not lucky on a second occasion, Resolute went aground on the outermost part of the notorious Bellambi Reef, in July 1907. After she struck the reef, she was able to reverse her engine and successfully pulled clear of the reef, but broke her propeller, leaving the ship unable to make way. Sails were set to try and move away from the reef, but this failed and the ship ended up back on the reef. She was then too far onto the reef to be pulled off by tugboats. Recognising that the situation was hopeless, Captain Johnson put the crew to work dismantling what could be salvaged; what was left of Resolute broke up once the seas rose. There were no deaths, but the vessel was uninsured at the time. She had been in service since 1883.

=== First Dunmore ===
During a westerly gale, the wooden-hulled auxiliary steamer Dunmore was steaming north, passing Coalcliff, in September 1894, when her tailshaft and propeller unexpectedly came loose and were lost. Her crew hoisted as much sail as they could on her masts, and sailed the fully-laden, disabled steamer to Sydney. She arrived off Sydney Heads around 9 p.m., and beat against the strong westerly wind to enter Sydney Harbour. It took until around 2 a.m., before she was anchored, adjacent to the Old Man's Hat rock formation (near the North Head Quarantine Station). After dawn, she was towed to Pyrmont, where she unloaded, and then taken for repair. It would be just one of many incidents that Dunmore would survive over her time as a coastal steamer.

In January 1898, near Bradley's Head, Dunmore was struck on her rails by the side paddle box of the steam ferry Brighton. In May 1898, a man working in the hold of the ship, while she was being unloaded at Pyrmont, was seriously injured when a basket of 'blue metal' dropped onto him.

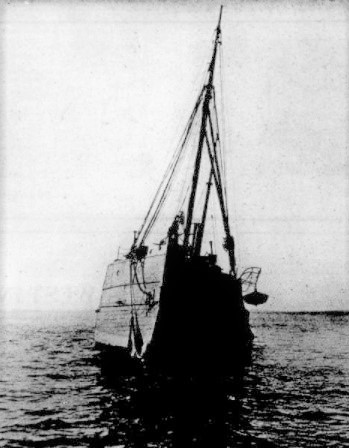
Dunmore lying beached after her collision with Kelloe.

Dunmore had a narrow escape after she collided with a much larger ship, the steel-hulled 'sixty-miler' Kelloe, two miles off the Botany Bay heads in May 1902. The Kelloe sank within 15 minutes. Dunmore picked up the Kelloe's crew and made it through the heads of Botany Bay, where she was only saved by being beached at Kurnell.

In March 1906, infantrymen were practising shooting, at what is now ANZAC Rifle Range. as the ship passed seaward from the range. Dunmore received a fusillade of bullets, and at least one bullet passed through her bridge and lodged in a lifeboat. Dunmore's mate had a narrow escape. June 1907 saw another shooting incident, while the Dunmore was discharging coal at Blackwattle Bay. A coal lumper, who had once been a seaman on the ship, Giovanni Embornone, fired two shots at another coal lumper, Charles Hansen, and was later charged.

Dunmore collided with a naval pinnace off Mrs Macquarie's Point in Sydney Harbour in January 1909, resulting in the drowning of 15 sailors from HMS Encounter. In November 1910, almost at the same location as the previous collision, Dunmore collided with the steam launch, Lady Hopetoun. The steam launch had some slight damage. In June 1911, a wharf labourer fell from a suspended plank onto the wharf at Pyrmont, while unloading gravel from Dunmore. Although he kept working at the time, around three weeks later he died in Sydney Hospital, as a result of injuries received in the fall.

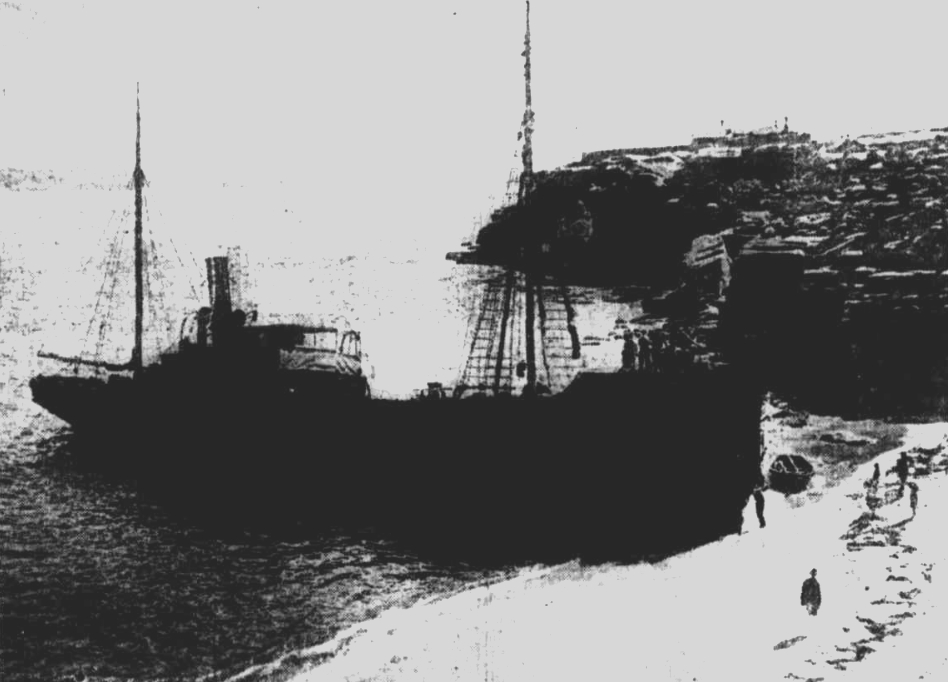
Dunmore, beached at Lady Bay, after her collision with Kiama.

Outbound from Sydney, Dunmore was involved in another collision, in April 1914, off the Heads of Sydney Harbour; this time she collided with another 'Stone Fleet' ship, the steel-hull Kiama, which was inbound and fully-laden with crushed stone at around 1 a.m. in the morning. Although Dunmore was left with a gaping hole in her bow and was taking in water, she remained afloat long enough to be beached at Lady Bay. In August 1915, while leaving the harbour at Port Kembla, the ship Southborough struck Dunmore, which was lying at anchor there. Both ships suffered minor damage. In September 1915, the Dunmore ran aground on a reef near Bradley's Head, during a fog, but sustained little damage. In February 1918, the Dunmore was involved in another collision—this time with the tug Champion—and sustained damage; a Court of Marine Inquiry found the Champion's master responsible.

In mid 1918, Dunmore left the local coastal trade. She was then used on interstate routes, but was back on the run from Shellharbour to Sydney, by early 1921. In March 1925, after a period of inactivity, Dunmore sank at her moorings at Balmain.

=== First Kiama ===
In September 1902, at the beginning of her delivery voyage from Scotland, Kiama struck the Gourock Pier, near the mouth of the River Clyde, and needed repairs before resuming the voyage. In May 1909, Kiama was bound for Kiama, steaming in ballast in hazy conditions, when she struck the most north-eastern point of Tom Thumb Island (also known as Flinders Island), one of the Five Islands Group, off Port Kembla. Although damaged and taking in some water, her captain elected to load part of a cargo of stone at Kiama, before returning to Sydney for repairs. In April 1914, she collided with another 'Stone Fleet' ship, Dunmore. In June 1917, she struck a submerged object off Cronulla, and one of her plates was damaged.

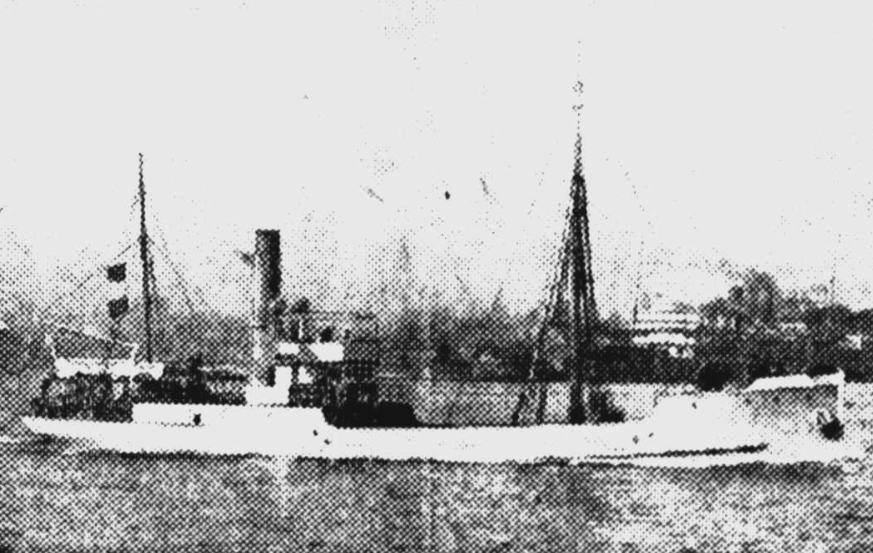
Kiama

In July 1921, Kiama was off Coalcliff, heading north to Sydney, and caught in a storm with little visibility. Her captain took her further offshore and rode out the storm, conserving the ship's remaining coal. The heavy seas damaged the steering of the vessel, but the crew—working under extreme conditions—repaired the steering mechanism. Conditions improved, but when the ship came closer to the coast, she was by then in sight of the light at Newcastle and far to the north of her intended route. Fears were held for Kiama, after a lifebuoy bearing her name washed up near Wollongong. A destroyer was sent to search for her, but was recalled once Kiama was sighted off Norah Head. Kiama had already turned south and she eventually reached Sydney, under her own power. She had left Kiama at 4 p.m., on Friday—expected to reach Sydney by 11 p.m.—but actually arrived in Sydney, on Sunday, thirty hours overdue.

=== Bombo ===
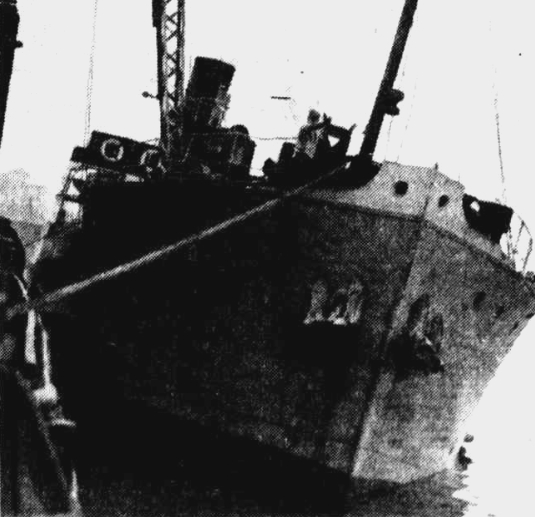
Bombo after arriving at Sydney with a bad list to port (January 1938).

In January 1938, Bombo had just left Kiama with a load of 'blue metal' when heavy weather caused the ship to develop a list to its port side. At times the rails of the ship were under water, but the weather improved passing Botany Bay, and the ship made it safely into Sydney Harbour. Captain A. R. Bell was quoted as saying, "Despite the fact that we had a bit of a list and were In heavy weather, the Bombo was quite safe." Captain Arthur Robert Bell was a very experienced master of Stone Fleet ships, commanding (first) Kiama and then, for many years, Bombo.

In February 1949, Bombo, carrying 'blue metal', was attempting to make for the safety of Port Kembla, when her list became so great that she rolled over and sank off the coast between Wollongong and Port Kembla. Twelve of the fourteen crew lost their lives. Ten had managed to escape from the ship, and were in the water hanging onto planks or other flotsum. Overnight two men died, including Captain Arthur Bell. The two survivors and the ship's dog were the only ones to make it to shore, but were found a considerable distance north of the location at which the ship sank.

=== Belbowrie ===
The small wooden twin-screw coastal steamer, Stone Fleet ship, and sometime sixty-miler, Belbowrie, had survived three incidents; a grounding on a sandy bottom at Doughboy Point (east of Boat Harbour), in June 1923, running aground near the entrance of Batemans Bay in March 1925, and a collision with a submerged object that holed her hull, in February 1931, while she was carrying coal from Newcastle to the gasworks at Nowra.

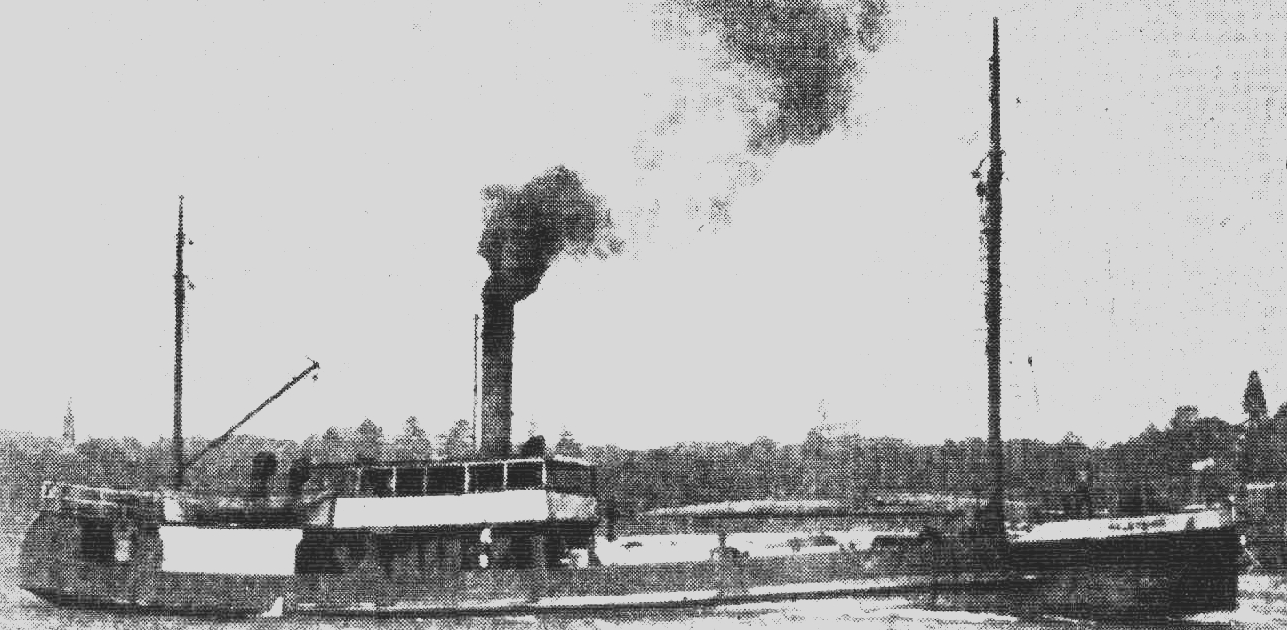
Belbowrie

In January 1939, Belbowrie was on her way south, to load a cargo of blue metal at Shellharbour. At night and with heavy rain reducing visibility, she ran straight onto rocks at a location, known as 'The Boulders', on the rock platform between the southern end of Maroubra Beach and the Malabar Headland. As she struck the rocks, she was hit by a wave that spun her around, so that her bow was left facing north. Her lifeboat was smashed. Members of the Maroubra Surf Life Saving Club rowed to the scene, in two surfboats, but could not approach the ship safely, due to the breaking waves. Her crew of ten all survived; they made their way to safety, one-by-one, hand-over-hand, suspended from a 70 foot long (21 m) rope line, while being drenched by the heavy rain and breaking surf. The tough old little ship then broke up, over the next two days. It seems that the south-east weather and waves had pushed her off course, too close to the coast, and onto the rocks.

=== Kiltobranks ===
In February 1924, the wooden steamer Kiltobranks had just loaded 'blue metal' at Shellharbour but, upon leaving the wharf, she went aground nearby during a north-easterly gale. Her back broken and with large seas breaking over her, she was a total loss.

=== Second Kiama ===
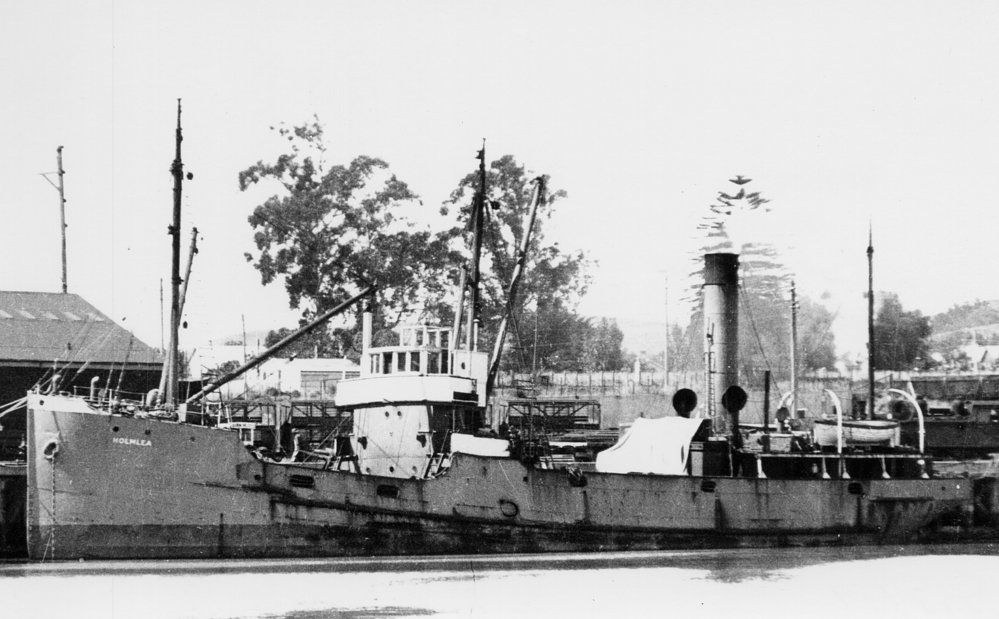
The second Kiama, during her earlier life as the New Zealand collier, Holmlea (between 1936 and 1950), while owned by Holm & Co. She had only months under the name Kiama.

In January 1951, the (second) Kiama, was carrying coal from Newcastle to Sydney, when she developed a serious list, during a gale. The crew desperately tried to trim the cargo to reduce the list. The gale then carried the ship onto the Tuggerah Reef—located offshore due east of Toowoon Bay. Kiama broke up and sank within a few minutes. Only six of the twelve crewmen survived by making it to shore, after an ordeal variously reported as being from three to four hours long. The crew abandoned the ship in the early hours of the morning, and were in the water—apart from one man who probably went down with the ship—in life vests. The men were too close to the reef to be picked up safely in the raging seas, by the CSR ship, Fiona, which was nearby. Some managed to board a lifeboat—floating upright—which had come loose from the wreck. They reached within 100 or 200 yards of the shore, before the boat rolled over in the surf. One of the men in the lifeboat did not make it to shore. The damaged boat washed up on the beach, reportedly either at Terrigal or at The Entrance. The bodies of only three of the six crew members who died were recovered, despite a 14-day aerial and land search by police. The coroner praised the "wonderful fortitude and bravery" of the crew, but found that four more might have survived had the ship been carrying life rafts.

=== Paterson ===
in December 1937, Paterson was alongside a wharf at Wooloomooloo, unloading gravel to the bins of Blue Metal and Gravel Pty Ltd, using a grab suspended from a derrick that was attached to her foremast. The foremast snapped and fell onto a sound truck that was on the wharf. Two men leapt clear, but a Cinesound sound technician who was working on the truck—as part of a film crew—was killed.

In June 1938, Paterson was involved in a collision, near McMahons Point on Sydney Harbour, with a punt being towed by the Maritime Services Board fire float, Pluvius. The punt and the stern of Pluvius were damaged.

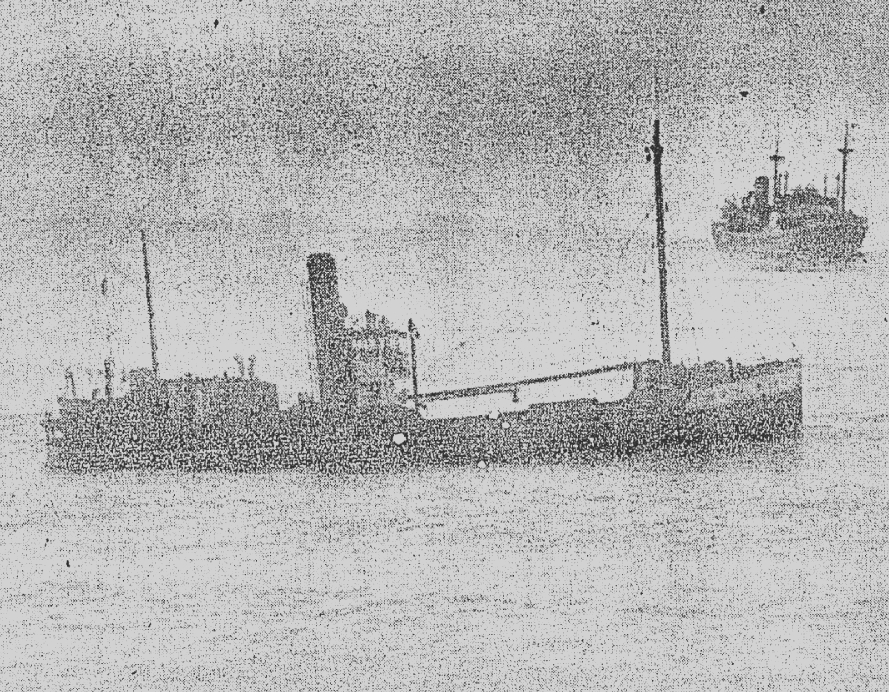
Paterson sinking (front), June 1951.

Paterson had a near miss, in 1949 during a storm off Wollongong, soon after she had replaced Bombo on the Kiama run. With her bunker coal wet due to waves breaking over the ship, it took her 46 hours to reach Sydney, after needing to take shelter in Botany Bay.

In June 1951, Paterson —carrying general cargo at the time— sprang a leak off The Entrance and made for the shelter of Cabbage Tree Bay, immediately north of Norah Head, where she anchored and then sank, around 300m from the old jetty, in 10m of water. The crew safely abandoned the ship and rowed ashore, in a boat, taking only their personal possessions with them. The location was not far from where Paterson had been beached and later refloated, after a similar incident, in November 1947, while carrying coal to Sydney, but this time it was the end of her. During 1951-1952, metal parts of the sunken vessel were salvaged.

Paterson's owner, Captain H.R. Lancey, died just over a month after she sank.

=== Other post-war incidents and losses ===
In January 1954, while the second 'Stone Fleet' ship known as Dunmore (MV Dunmore, formerly Nassau) was in Kiama Harbour, her engineer was badly burned when a diesel engine back-fired. He leapt into the water to extinguish his burning clothing but later died of his injuries.

During the post-war period, the sixty-miler Birchgrove Park sometimes filled in carrying stone; while carrying coal, she foundered off Sydney in February 1956. One man, the ship's cook, who died despite making it to the relative safety of a drifting lifeboat, had survived the sinking of Kiama, in 1951.

Hexham Bank had survived her time carrying coal as a 'sixty-miler' but, in June 1978, while preparing to load crushed stone at Bass Point, she caught fire. All her crew were rescued. Her engine room was destroyed and she was deemed a "constructive loss" and scrapped. Her hulk later was later sunk off Sydney Heads.

In December 1998, MV Claudia was alongside the loader at Bass Point and loading a cargo of crushed stone, when it was found that she was taking water through a puncture in her hull. After making temporary repairs, the ship sailed, without loading any more cargo, to be repaired in Sydney.

== Legacy and remnants ==
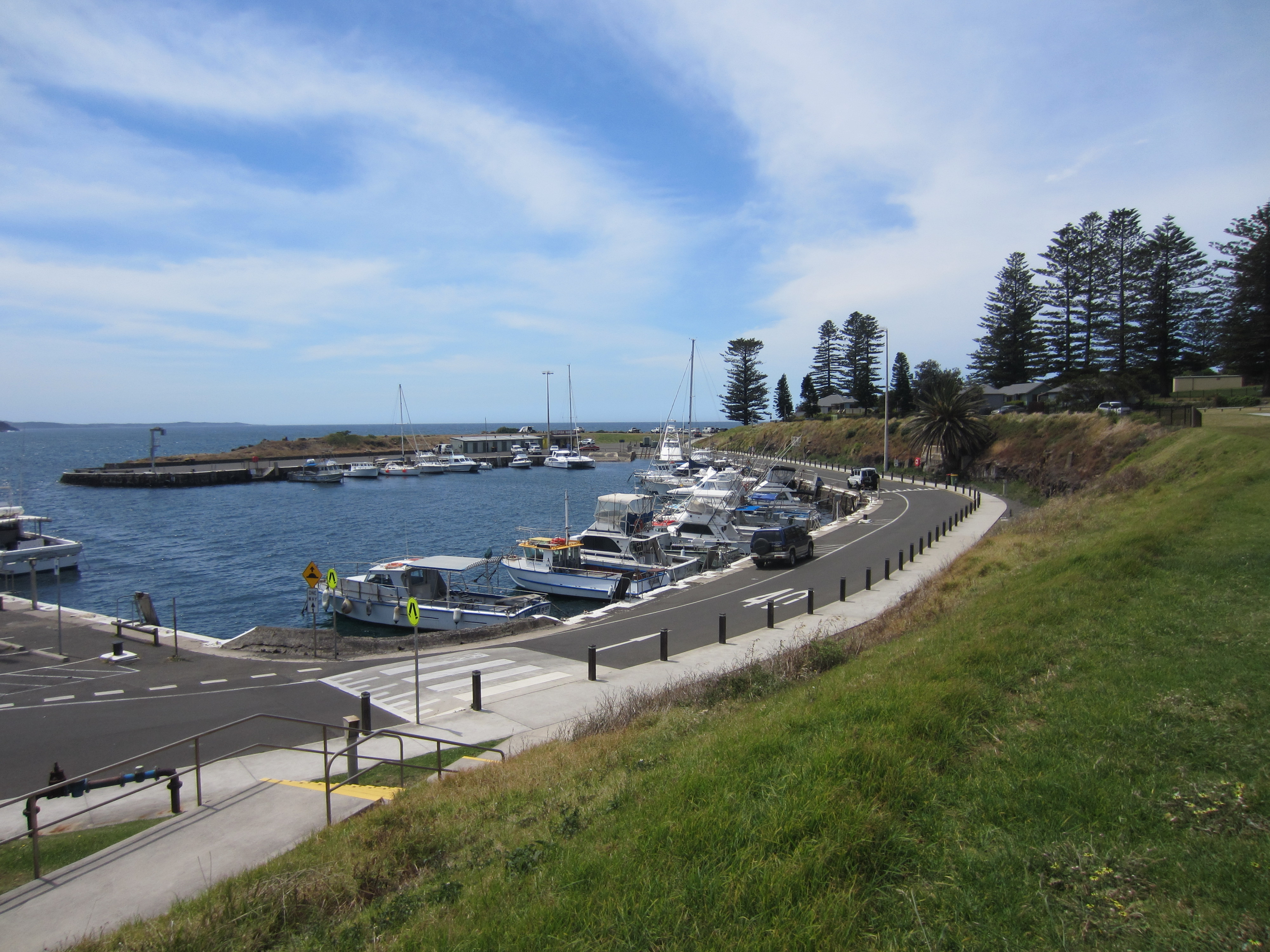
Robertson Basin, Kiama, in October 2020. The stone foundations of two staiths used to load crushed stone are visible to the right of the roadway, after the bend.

None of the 'Stone Fleet' ships survive. Bombo and her crew are commemorated by two plaques near Kiama Harbour. Her wreck lies on the seabed near Port Kembla. There are still some remains of Paterson, in shallow water north of Norah Head, making it an easy dive. Also a dive site is the scuttled Lass o' Gowrie, now part of an artificial reef at Hervey Bay. Another prized dive site is the sunken wreck of Southern Glory —she was used after Bass Point reopened, under her previous name, Lisa Miller—in Brunei waters, where she sunk during a storm in 1993, last flying the Malaysian flag.

The Robertson Basin at Kiama remains but is no longer a shipping port. Remnants of the narrow-gauge tramway once could be found in Terralong Street, Kiama, outside the Presbyterian Church and the locations of the loading bins at the basin can still be identified. A Fowler locomotive, from the tramway, is under restoration at the Illawarra Light Railway Museum. A second locomotive, 'Kiama', also used on the quarry tramway, is preserved there in operational condition. The old Kiama quarry site straddles Terralong Street, beyond its intersection with Thomson Street in Kiama; it is now occupied by buildings, sporting fields, and open space.

The headland quarry at Bombo is now the Bombo Headland Quarry Geological Site, but nothing remains of its ocean jetty, except for some rock-filled parts at the land end of the former jetty's site. There are still two working quarries at Bombo; one is operated by Sydney Trains and the other by Boral.

The harbour at Shellharbour is now used for recreational boating. The disused gravel loader, at nearby Bass Point, remains as part of the Bass Point Reserve. A little west of the gravel loader, a crumbling concrete ruin seems to be all that remains at the earlier ocean jetty's site. The quarry at Bass Point remains in use and there is another operating quarry at nearby Dummore.

A Hanson concrete batching plant remained at Blackwattle Bay in January 2020, at the site of the former unloading facility, but was no longer used by ships. Its site had been cleared completely, to make way for the new Sydney Fish Market, by November 2021.

The southern Illawarra has continued to be the main source of construction aggregate and ballast—for Sydney and much of New South Wales—for over 140 years. Although somewhat hidden from public view, the huge voids created by quarrying are apparent in aerial views.

== See also ==
- Sixty-miler
- Fowler narrow-gauge locomotive from Kiama
- 'Kiama' (locomotive)
