= NSW Kiama Fowler =

Former train in New South Wales, Australia

Kiama Fowler
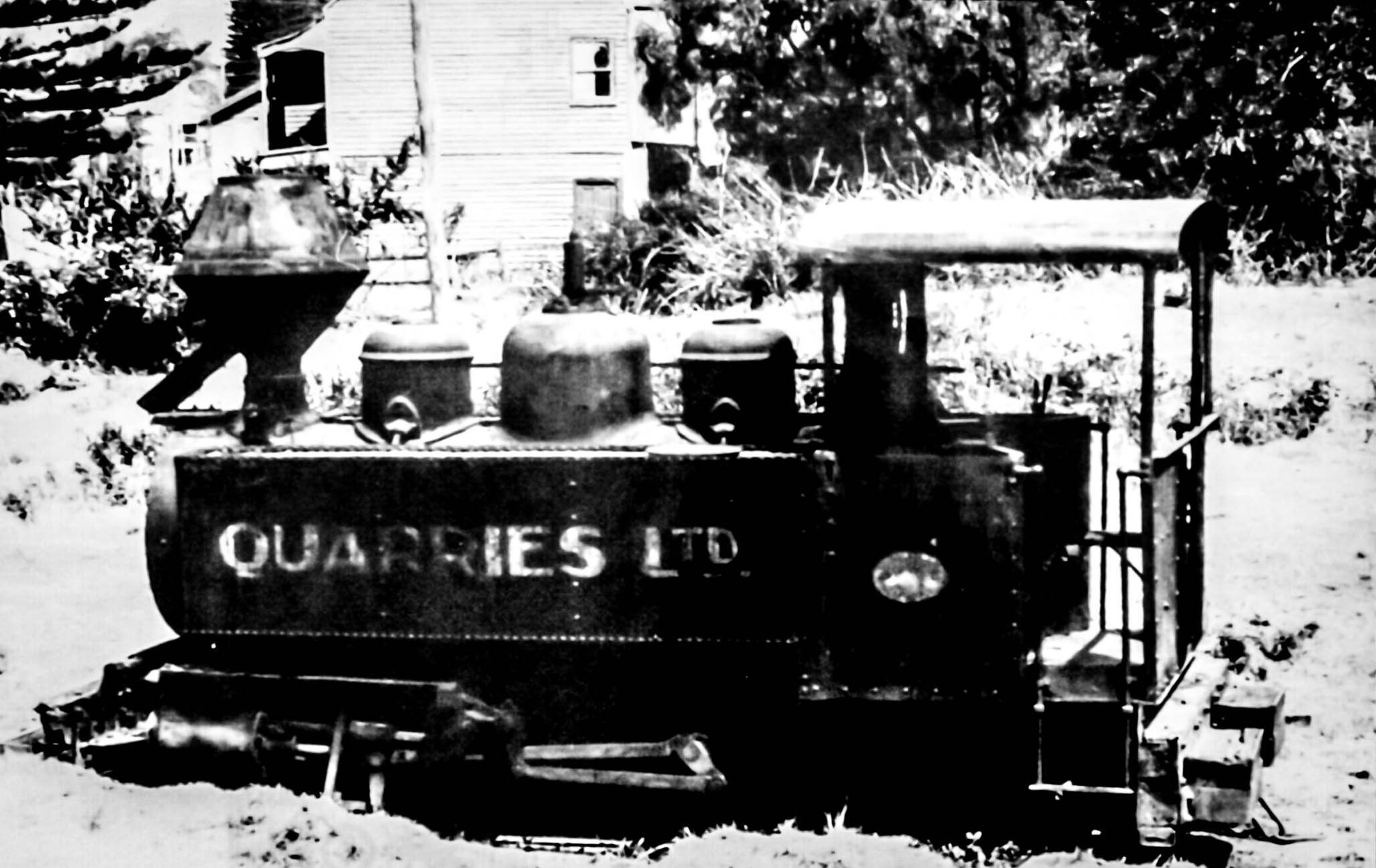
- Kiama Fowler 0-4-0 Locomotive
Type and origin
- Power type: Steam
- Builder: John Fowler & Co. Leeds, England
- Serial number: 16089
- Build date: 1923
Specifications
- Configuration
  - Whyte: 0-4-0T
- Gauge: 2 feet 0 inches (609.600 mm)
- Driver dia.: 2 ft 0 in (0.610 m)
- Loco weight: 7.5 long tons (7.6 t)
- Firebox
  - Grate area: 4 sq ft (0.37 m^{2})
- Boiler pressure: 160 lbf/in^{2} (1.10 MPa)
- Cylinders: Two, outside
- Cylinder size: 8 in × 12 in (200 mm × 300 mm)
Performance figures
- Tractive effort: 4,096 lbf (18.2 kN)
Career
- Operators: Kiama Quarry Tramway

NSW Kiama Fowler is a steam locomotive that was in service in New South Wales, Australia. It is sometimes also called Wollondilly.

== History ==
Kiama Fowler was built by the John Fowler plant at Leeds in England in 1923, it was used at the Kiama Quarries for blue metal haulage at the town of Kiama until 1941 when the quarry was shut down. ("Blue metal" is another name for basalt.)

== Demise and preservation ==
After the Quarry had closed the locomotive was used by a variety of preservation groups until donated to the Illawarra Light Railway Museum on 28 August 1998. As of 2015, it is under restoration.
