= Bombo, New South Wales =

Bombo
- Suburb
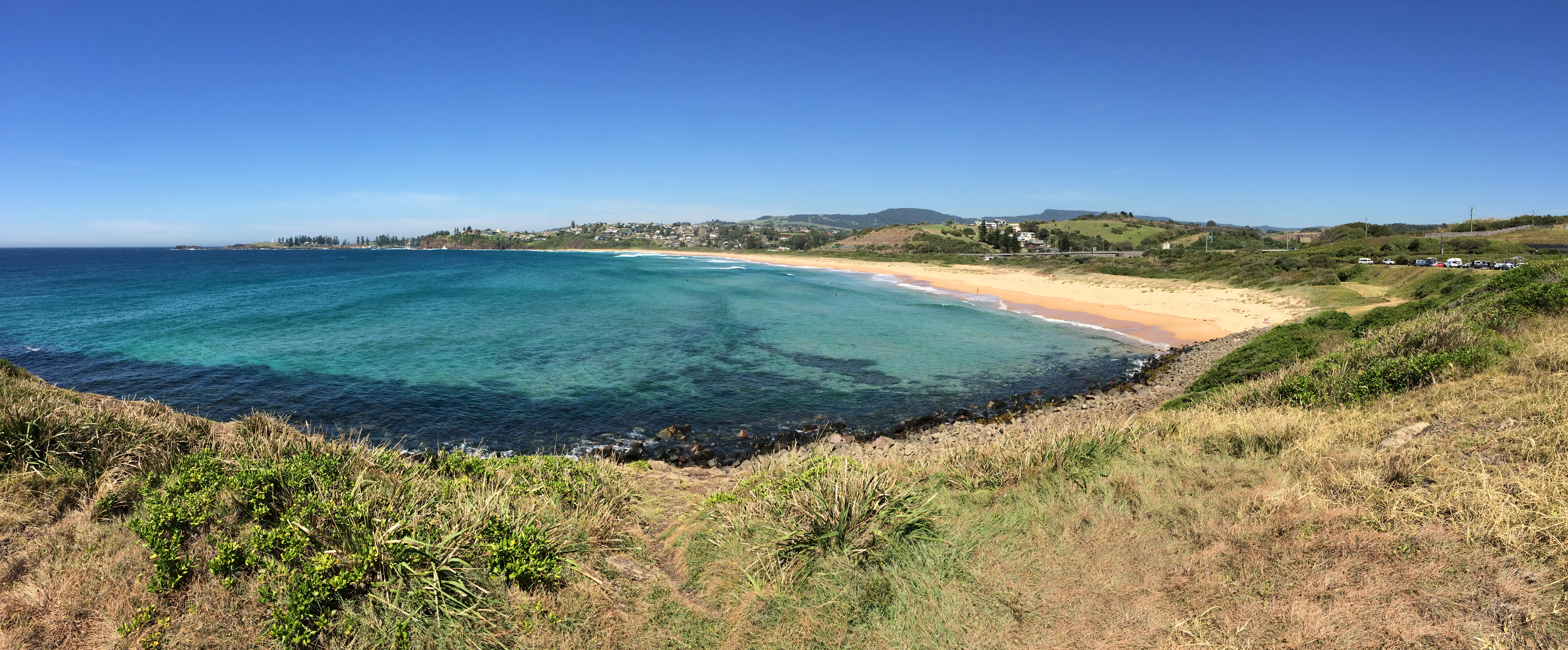
- Panorama of Bombo, on the shorefront of Bombo Beach

- Interactive map of Bombo
- Coordinates: 34°39′S 150°51.5′E
- Country: Australia
- State: New South Wales
- City: Kiama
- LGA: Municipality of Kiama
- Location: 119 km (74 mi) SSW of Sydney; 38 km (24 mi) S of Wollongong; 2 km (1.2 mi) N of Kiama

Government
  - State electorate: Kiama
  - Federal division: Gilmore
- Elevation: 16 m (52 ft)

Population
  - Total: 175 (2021 census)
- Postcode: 2533
- County: Camden
- Parish: Kiama
- Mean max temp: 21.4 °C (70.5 °F)
- Mean min temp: 14.7 °C (58.5 °F)
- Annual rainfall: 1,167.5 mm (45.96 in)
Suburbs around Bombo
| Kiama Downs | Kiama Downs |
| Jamberoo | Bombo | Tasman Sea |
| Kiama | Kiama |

Bombo is a suburb of the Municipality of Kiama, in the Illawarra region of New South Wales, Australia. It is located 2 kilometres (1.2 mi) north of Kiama.

== Etymology ==
Bombo is derived from "Thumbon", the name of a renowned headman and warrior born in this district.

== Infrastructure ==
Bombo is the gateway between Kiama and its northern suburbs, Kiama Downs and Minnamurra. The Princes Highway runs through Bombo. In November 2005 a new six lane road opened replacing the original two lane road.

Bombo railway station opened in 1887 as the terminus of the Illawarra railway line. In 1893 the line was extended to Kiama. It is the closest railway station to the Pacific Ocean in New South Wales.

In the 1950s the New South Wales Government Railways established a ballast quarry. Boral operated an adjoining quarry from the 1970s until 2014.

== The Bombo disaster ==
The basalt quarry at Bombo was the site of a serious accident on 7 May 1888, when an explosive charge detonated prematurely and a mass of rock fell to the ground below where men were working. Four were killed and several severely injured.

("The Bombo disaster" could also refer to the 539-ton SS Bombo which sank off Wollongong in heavy seas on 22 February 1949 and Captain Bell and 11 other men died. The ship was owned by Quarries Pty Ltd. and carrying stone from the Kiama quarries to Sydney.)

== Geography ==
Bombo's main waterway is Spring Creek.

Boneyard Falls, an oceanic wave action waterfall, are located on the Bombo Headland.

=== Climate ===
Bombo experiences a humid subtropical climate bordering on an oceanic climate (Köppen: Cfa/Cfb) with very warm, wetter summers and mild, drier winters. The wettest recorded day was 25 August 2015 with 170.4 mm (6.71 in) of rainfall. Extreme temperatures ranged from 45.0 °C (113.0 °F) on 18 January 2013 to 4.9 °C (40.8 °F) on 17 July 2007.

Climate data for Bombo Headland (34.65°S 150.86°E) (16 m (52 ft) AMSL) (2001-2025)
| Month | Jan | Feb | Mar | Apr | May | Jun | Jul | Aug | Sep | Oct | Nov | Dec | Year |
|---|---|---|---|---|---|---|---|---|---|---|---|---|---|
| Record high °C (°F) | 45.0 (113.0) | 39.3 (102.7) | 39.5 (103.1) | 31.2 (88.2) | 27.8 (82.0) | 23.4 (74.1) | 28.2 (82.8) | 29.3 (84.7) | 34.7 (94.5) | 38.1 (100.6) | 41.5 (106.7) | 39.0 (102.2) | 45.0 (113.0) |
| Mean daily maximum °C (°F) | 25.0 (77.0) | 24.6 (76.3) | 24.0 (75.2) | 22.2 (72.0) | 19.8 (67.6) | 17.6 (63.7) | 17.3 (63.1) | 18.1 (64.6) | 20.3 (68.5) | 21.6 (70.9) | 22.7 (72.9) | 23.9 (75.0) | 21.4 (70.6) |
| Mean daily minimum °C (°F) | 19.1 (66.4) | 18.9 (66.0) | 18.0 (64.4) | 15.7 (60.3) | 13.1 (55.6) | 11.3 (52.3) | 10.2 (50.4) | 10.8 (51.4) | 12.2 (54.0) | 14.0 (57.2) | 15.8 (60.4) | 17.3 (63.1) | 14.7 (58.5) |
| Record low °C (°F) | 13.1 (55.6) | 12.2 (54.0) | 11.6 (52.9) | 9.0 (48.2) | 5.3 (41.5) | 5.0 (41.0) | 4.9 (40.8) | 6.2 (43.2) | 5.8 (42.4) | 7.0 (44.6) | 7.6 (45.7) | 11.2 (52.2) | 4.9 (40.8) |
| Average precipitation mm (inches) | 95.2 (3.75) | 152.4 (6.00) | 185.8 (7.31) | 95.2 (3.75) | 85.4 (3.36) | 96.7 (3.81) | 93.1 (3.67) | 77.5 (3.05) | 60.2 (2.37) | 81.6 (3.21) | 78.5 (3.09) | 73.9 (2.91) | 1,167.5 (45.96) |
| Average precipitation days (≥ 0.2 mm) | 12.7 | 13.7 | 15.2 | 12.0 | 8.4 | 10.3 | 8.9 | 8.1 | 9.1 | 12.1 | 11.4 | 12.1 | 134 |
Source: Bureau of Meteorology (2001-2025)

== Heritage listings ==
Bombo has a number of heritage-listed sites, including:

- Illawarra railway: Bombo railway station
- Princes Highway: Bombo Headland Quarry Geological Site

== See also ==
- Stone Fleet (New South Wales)
