= NSW Burra =

Australian steam locomotive

Burra
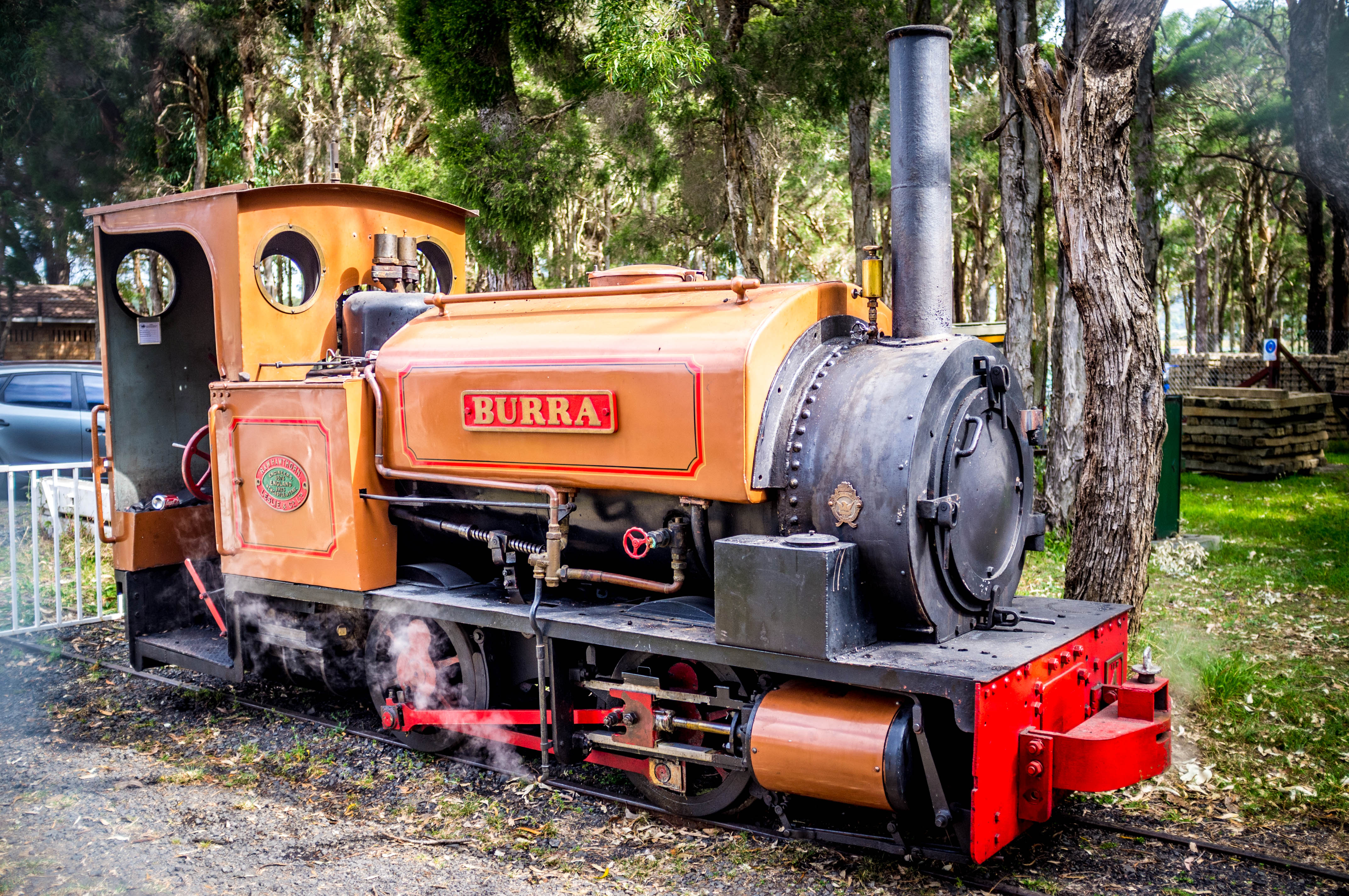
- Burra 0-4-0 ST Locomotive
Type and origin
- Power type: Steam
- Builder: Hawthorn Leslie & Company; Newcastle upon Tyne
- Serial number: 3574
- Build date: 1923
Specifications
- Configuration
  - Whyte: 0-4-0ST
- Gauge: 2 ft (610 mm)
- Driver dia.: 2 ft 0 in (610 mm)
- Loco weight: 7.5 long tons (7.6 t; 8.4 short tons)
- Firebox
  - Grate area: 4 sq ft (0.37 m^{2})
- Boiler pressure: 160 lbf/in^{2} (1.10 MPa)
- Cylinders: 2 outside
- Cylinder size: 8 in × 12 in (203 mm × 305 mm)
Performance figures
- Tractive effort: 4,096 lbf (18.2 kN)
Career
- Operators: Australian Iron & Steel Colliery; Corrimal
- Current owner: Illawarra Light Railway Museum
- Disposition: Preserved

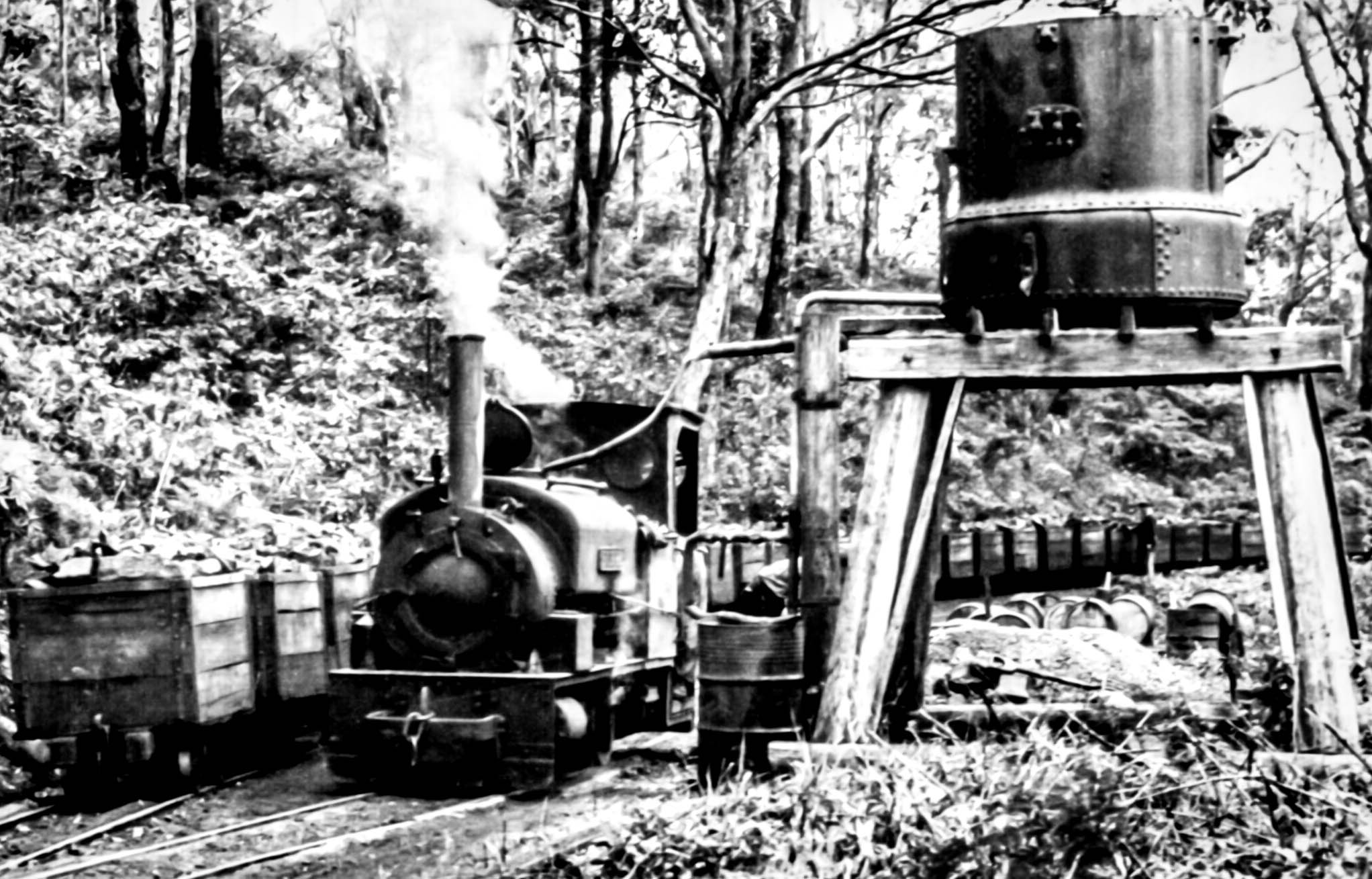
Burra at Corrimal

Burra (short for Kookaburra) is an Australian steam locomotive. It was ordered by Corrimal Colliery, to work at the colliery, on 1 May 1923 and delivered on 26 November 1923. In 1946 an overhaul with a new boiler was carried out by Clyde Engineering.

Following the purchase of Corrimal Colliery by Australian Iron & Steel Burra was restored and placed on static display at the steelworks in 1968. In 1978 it was donated to the Illawarra Light Railway Museum. The locomotive was restored to service in 1995 and remains operational.
