= Bombo Headland Quarry Geological Site =

Former quarry and geological site in Australia

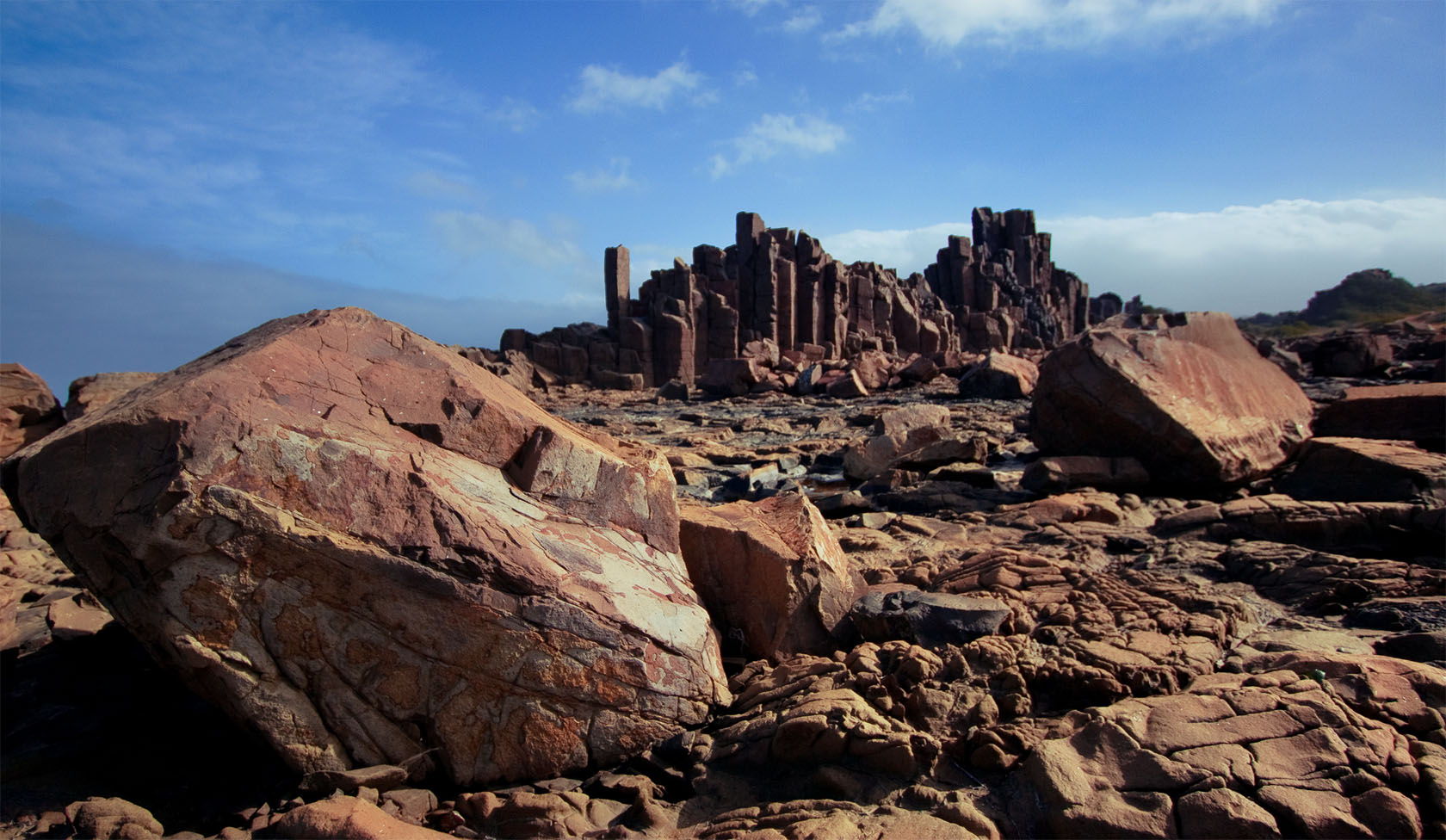

- Location within New South Wales Location within Australia
- Interactive map of Bombo Headland Quarry Geological Site
- 34°39′00″S 150°51′48″E
- Location: Princes Highway, Bombo, Municipality of Kiama, New South Wales, Australia

Site notes
- Owner: Department of Planning and Infrastructure; Sydney Water

New South Wales Heritage Register
- Official name: Bombo Headland Quarry Geological Site; Bombo Quarry
- Type: state heritage (landscape)
- Designated: 2 April 1999
- Reference no.: 177
- Type: Geological site or area
- Category: Landscape – Natural

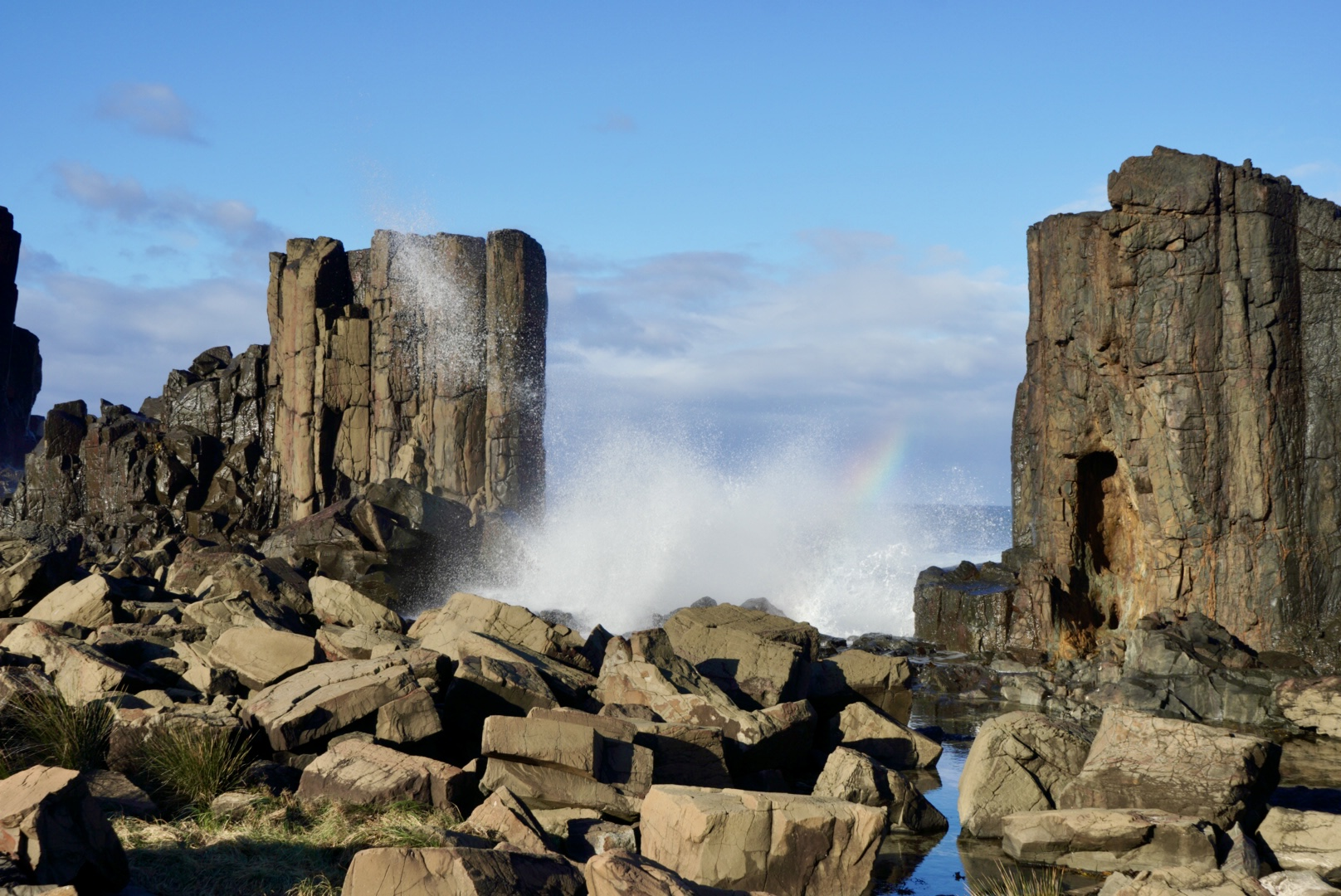
Bombo Quarry

Bombo Headland Quarry Geological Site is a heritage-listed former quarry and now geological site located on a coastal headland at Bombo, in the Illawarra region of New South Wales, Australia. It was added to the New South Wales State Heritage Register on 2 April 1999.

== History ==
In 1979 a nomination was received from the Geological Society of Australia (NSW Division) for the Bombo Quarry. The importance of the geological features was brought to the Heritage Council's attention by Dr. Suzanne Wass of Macquarie University's School of Earth Sciences. The quarry was owned by the Metropolitan Water, Sewerage, and Drainage Board and it was proposed that a pollution control plant be constructed on the floor of the disused quarry. It also made an appearance in Mighty Morphin Power Rangers: The Movie as part of the planet Phaedos.

Following site inspections and lengthy consultations between the Metropolitan Water, Sewerage and Drainage Board, NSW Heritage Council, NSW Planning Commission, and other key agencies a Permanent Conservation Order was placed over the site in 1983. It was transferred onto the State Heritage Register in 1999.

== Description ==
Two units of the Late Permian Gerringong volcanic facies are exposed on Bombo Headland. The Kiama Sandstone member forms a narrow wave-cut platform and adjacent vertical cliff face around the south-eastern extremity of the quarry. To the north, the sandstone dips below sea level and is overlain by about 20m of porphyritic basalt, termed Bombo Latite member. The contact between the two units is well-exposed in the cliff section at the eastern end of the two points comprising the headland section. The red-brown colour (due to oxidization of haematite) of the sandstone contrasts markedly with the grey-black latite, which displays spectacular columnar jointing elsewhere in the quarry. Isolated columns 5–5 meters in height stand adjacent to the coast between the north and south parts of the quarry; just to the north the sea wall exposes cross-sections of the columns 1-2.5 metres in diameter, resulting in a "Giants Causeway" appearance.

Petrographic descriptions of the latite emphasise its conspicuous porphyritic texture; large labradorite to andesine phenocrysts with minor clinopyroxene are set in a groundmass of feldspar microlites with interstitial chlorite and iron oxide. The latter is commonly vesicular. Agglomerates or volcanic breccias are developed in some areas of the quarry. E.g. in the south-western portion near the access road. This lithology is readily distinguished from the latter by its chaotic appearance and light-coloured matrix.

A capping of cream-coloured weathered latite, still retaining the characteristic porphyritic texture, maybe studied at the top of the northern and western quarry faces. This sharply defined zone of surface weathering and soil formation overlies relatively fresh rock exhibiting columnar jointing.

The Bombo Latite Member was subsequently intruded by at least five basaltic (Monchique) dykes of probable Tertiary age which flowed around and between the columns of latite often taking 90-degree changes in direction. Early workers mapped and described these dykes, but subsequent quarry development provided further exposures and obliterated others. Today dykes are mainly in the northern half of the quarry, but at least one extends across the excavation floor in the isolated columnar stacks. They are of interest due to their inclusions of xenoliths and xenocrysts, which are believed to represent fragments of the earth's mantle incorporated in magmas originating from within that zone. Sussmilch (1905) described xenoliths of hypersthene gabbro, augite peridotite, enstatite peridotite and pyroxenite occurring as rounded fragments and boulders embedded in the monchiquite. From a deeper level of what was probably the same dyke, Wilshire & Binns (1961) recorded hornblendite and glimmerite as the dominant xenoliths. Present exposures of most of the other dykes appear to lack macroscopically visible xenoliths.

== Heritage listing ==
Bombo Headland Quarry Geological site is of research/technical significance in the numerous dykes which cut the Permian Bombo Latite. One of the dykes is geologically unique and contains abundant xenoliths which represent material brought up to the Earth's mantle, about 80 kilometres below the surface of Eastern Australia. The mineral assemblages including apatite, amphibole, pyroxene, spinel and ilmenite, and the range of compositions are unique and are not represented anywhere else in the world. The Bombo Latite Member is also of international scientific significance in providing one of several samples upon which the concept and limits of Kiaman Magnetic Interval were defined. Like rocks of Permian age throughout the world, the latite shows a reversed polarity (at the time of its extrusion the North and South magnetic poles were reversed). This interval, named after Kiama, has been used for intercontinental palaeomagnetic correlation of Late Palaeozoic rock sequences. The area is of high educational value. In addition, the area is scenically attractive and has considerable potential for recreational and tourist use.

Bombo Headland Quarry Geological Site was listed on the New South Wales State Heritage Register on 2 April 1999.

== See also ==
- Stone Fleet (New South Wales)
