= Boneyard Falls =

- Location within New South Wales
- Location: Bombo, near Kiama, New South Wales, Australia
- Coordinates: 34°39′05″S 150°51′45″E

The Boneyard Falls are an overflow of waves located at Bombo on the Bombo Headland, near Kiama on the south coast of New South Wales, Australia. Though looking like a waterfall, the falls are caused by waves crashing on the opposite side of the rocky headland.

== See also ==
- List of waterfalls in Australia
