= NSW Kiama =

Formerly operated train in Australia

Kiama PWD No. 65
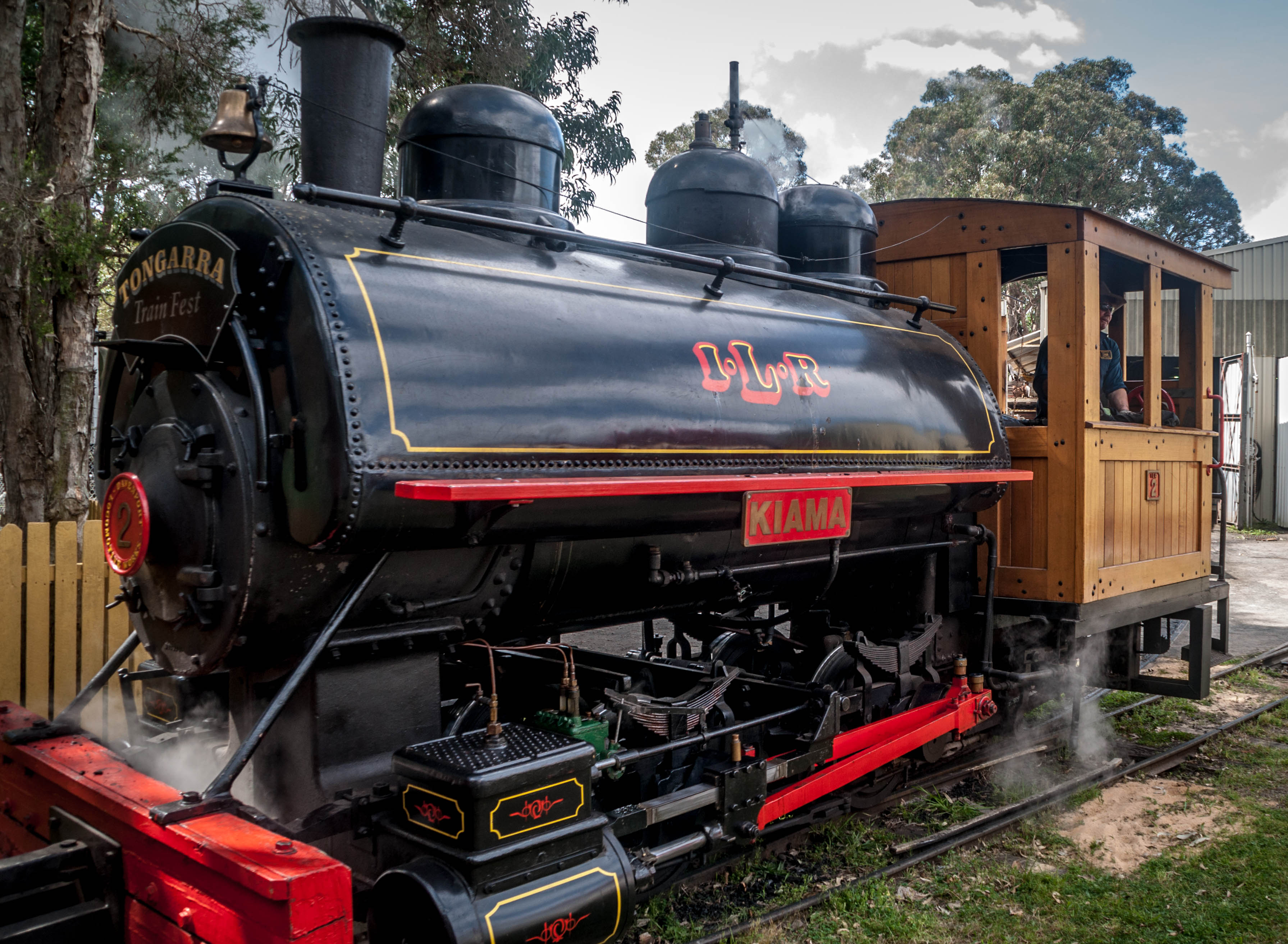
- Kiama 0-4-0 T Locomotive
Type and origin
- Power type: Steam
- Builder: Davenport Locomotive Works; Iowa USA
- Serial number: 1596
- Build date: 1917
Specifications
- Configuration
  - Whyte: 0-4-0ST
- Gauge: 2 ft (610 mm)
- Driver dia.: 2 ft 0 in (610 mm)
- Loco weight: 7.5 long tons (7.6 t; 8.4 short tons)
- Firebox
  - Grate area: 4 sq ft (0.37 m^{2})
- Boiler pressure: 160 lbf/in^{2} (1.10 MPa)
- Cylinders: Two, outside
- Cylinder size: 10 in × 14 in (254 mm × 356 mm)
Performance figures
- Tractive effort: 4,096 lbf (18.2 kN)
Career
- Operators: NSW Public Works Dept; Kiama Quarry Tramway

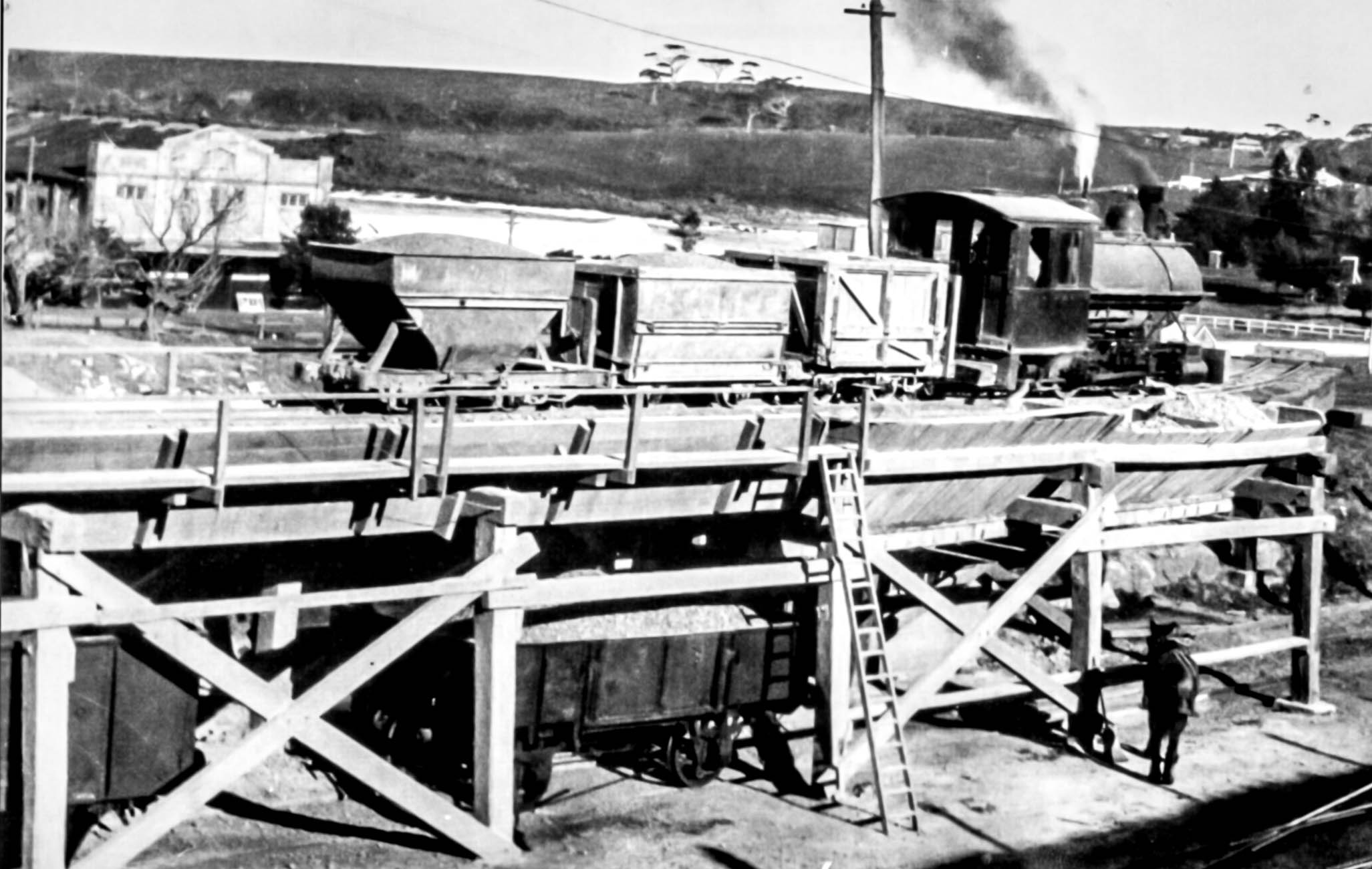
Kiama Blue Metal tramway

NSW Kiama was a steam locomotive seeing service in New South Wales, Australia.

== History ==
Davenport 1596 was ordered for construction operations as PWD No. 65 on Cordeaux Dam light railway between the Nepean Gorge near Douglas Park and the Dam along Mount Keira Road between 1917 and 1926. The locomotive was purchased by Quarries Ltd. during 1936 and transferred to Kiama Blue Metal tramway.

== Demise and Preservation ==
The Kiama tramway closed in March 1941. The locomotive was utilised by several heritage organisations and finally preserved by Illawarra Light Railway Museum in 1977.
