= HMAS Paterson =

Minesweeper operated by the Royal Australian Navy

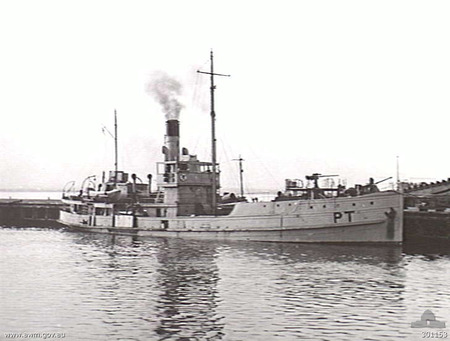
- HMAS Paterson

History

Australia
- Name: Paterson
- Launched: 10 December 1919
- Fate: Foundered 1951

History

Australia
- Name: Paterson
- Commissioned: 1 May 1941
- Fate: Returned to owners 1945

General characteristics
- Tonnage: 446 gross register tonnage
- Length: 148.8 ft (45 m)
- Beam: 32.7 ft (10 m)
- Depth: 11.3 ft (3 m)
- Armament: 1 × 12-pounder gun; 1 × 20mm Oerlikon cannon; 1 × .303-inch Vickers machine gun

HMAS Paterson (FY. 109) was a wooden auxiliary minesweeper operated by the Royal Australian Navy (RAN) during World War II. She was built in 1919–20 by T.F. Morrison, Sinclair & Company at Balmain. The ship operated as a coastal steamer and was requisitioned by the RAN in 1941. She was returned to her owners on 26 November 1945 before sinking near The Entrance, New South Wales on 11 June 1951.

== Operational history ==
Requisitioned during the height of World War II, HMAS Paterson served as an auxiliary minesweeper for the Royal Australian Navy (RAN). Originally a wooden coastal steamer built in 1920, the vessel was formally commissioned on 1 May 1941 under the command of Lieutenant Percy G. Collins. Following her conversion for naval service, which included the installation of a 12-pounder gun, a Vickers machine gun, and depth charge throwers, she was initially assigned to Minesweeping Group 54 based in Melbourne. Her early service involved maintaining clear channels in the Bass Strait and the approaches to Port Phillip Bay, providing a vital defense against the threat of German sea mines.

In November 1941, Paterson was reassigned to Minesweeping Group 50 in Sydney, and by February 1942, she moved further north to join Minesweeping Group 77 in Newcastle. Her operational routine consisted of grueling daily sweeps of the New South Wales coastline to ensure the safety of vital merchant shipping lanes. Beyond her primary role, the ship was occasionally utilized for target towing exercises to assist the Army’s coastal artillery batteries and conducted occasional long-range sweeps as far north as Moreton Bay, Brisbane. Despite the hazards of coastal navigation and the constant threat of enemy activity, she remained a reliable workhorse of the auxiliary fleet throughout the conflict.

Following the cessation of hostilities, Paterson was decommissioned at Sydney on 26 November 1945. After being stripped of her naval armament and equipment, she was returned to her civilian owners in 1946 to resume her life as a coastal freighter. Her post-war career was brief and marked by misfortune; she was nearly lost in 1947 after springing a leak and being beached near Norah Head. Though successfully refloated, her luck ran out on 11 June 1951. While carrying a general cargo—notoriously including nearly 500 dozen bottles of beer—the vessel foundered and sank near Bird Island off the New South Wales Central Coast, where the wreck remains a site of interest for local divers today near The Entrance.33.277836°S 151.571896°E
