= Illawarra Light Railway Museum =

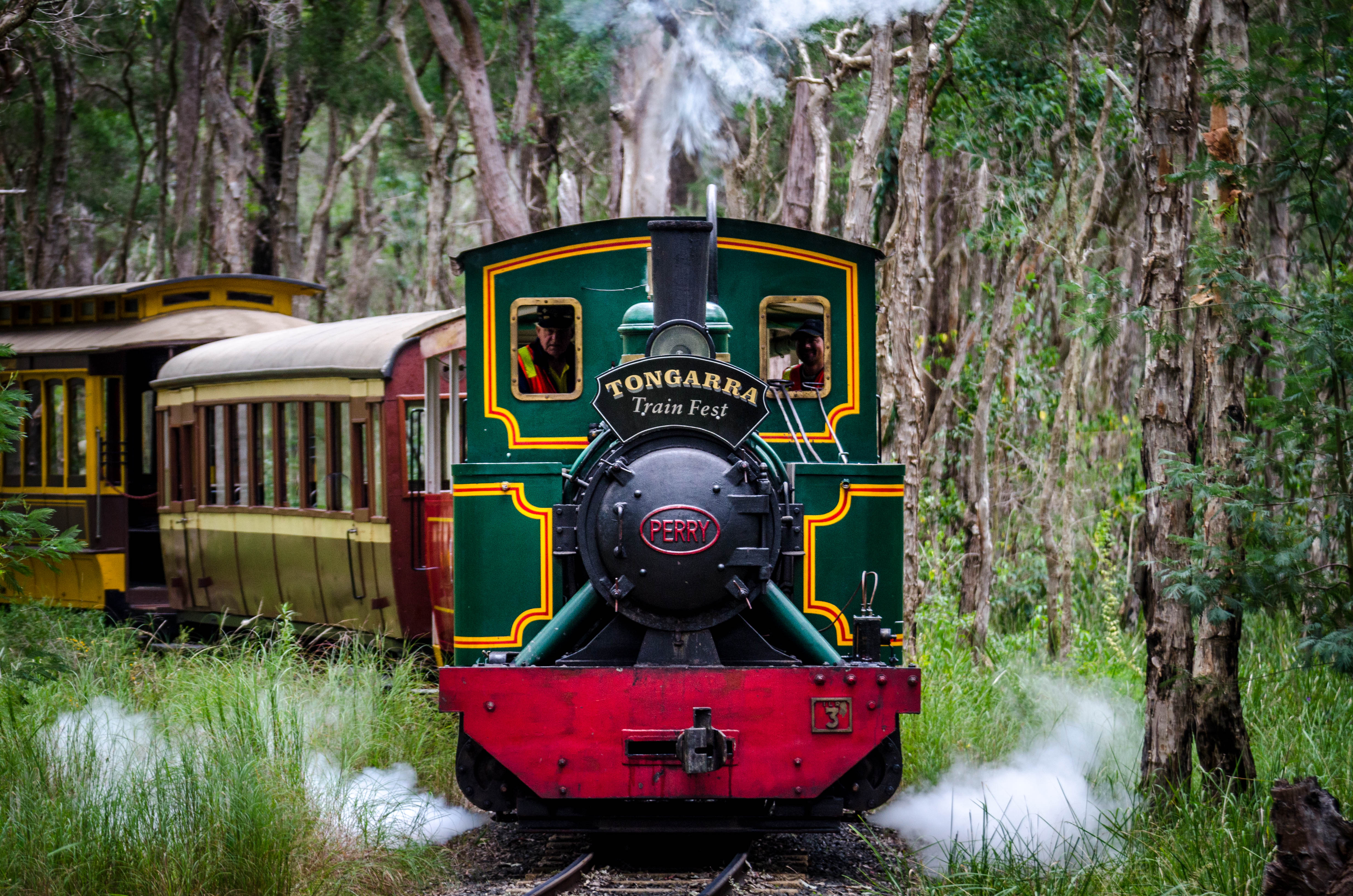

- Location within New South Wales Location within Australia
- Established: 1972
- Location: 48A Tongarra Road; Albion Park Rail, New South Wales, Australia
- Coordinates: 34.568528°S 150.792049°E
- Type: Light Railway museum
- Parking: On site
- Website: www.ilrms.com.au

The Illawarra Light Railway Museum operates a mainline 2 ft (610 mm) narrow gauge light railway, a miniature 7 1/4 in (184 mm) gauge railway, and a museum located in Albion Park Rail, New South Wales, Australia.

== History ==
The Illawarra Light Railway Museum Society was founded in February 1972. the Museum site was leased from Shellharbour City Council and the Leased signed in 1974, with railway operations commencing in 1974 dedicated to preserving Light Railway history and Illawarra industrial history. It was officially opened on 10 November 1984. In 2007 the society obtained federal funding for the construction of the Ken McCarthy Museum Building, which was officially opened in December 2007.

== Operations ==
The Museum is opened on the Second Sunday and Fourth Saturday of each month from 10am to 2pm

- Work Days being Tuesdays, Thursdays.
- Running Days every second Sunday and fourth Saturday of each month.

The museum site consist of the following features:

- Yallah station building, arrived May 1976
- Otford Signal Box, arrived 1985
- Souvenir Shop & Kiosk
- Workshop and Locomotive & Carriage Storage Shed
- Ken McCarthy Museum Building
- Arthur Moore Stationary Engine Display

== Exhibits ==
Steam Locomotives
No.	Description	Manufacturer	Year	Operator	ex-Railway	Status	Ref
Cairns	0-6-0	Hudswell Clarke	1939	Colonial Sugar Refinery	Edmonton, retired from CSR Victoria Mill 1976	On display
Tully 6	0-6-2ST	Perry Engineering	1949	Tully Sugar Mill	Tully	Overhaul
Burra	0-4-0ST	Hawthorn Leslie & Company	1923	Australian Iron & Steel	Corrimal	Operational
Kiama	0-4-0ST	Davenport Locomotive Works	1913	NSW Public Works Department	Kiama Quarries	Operational
Shay	Shay locomotive	Lima Locomotive Works	c1900	Munro Tramway	Hampton	Stored

Apart from the wooden trams, a horse-drawn wagon of the Dry Creek explosives depot near Adelaide is particularly noteworthy.
