= Dunmore (ship) =

Small wooden bulk cargo ship

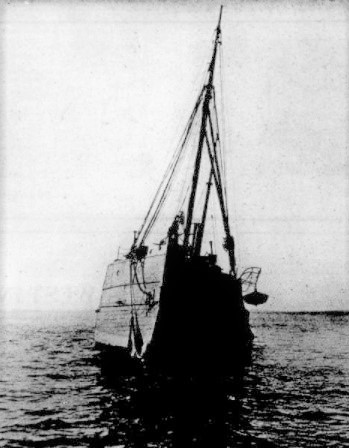
- Dunmore beached after collision with Kelloe (1902).

History
- Name: Dunmore
- Owner: G.L. Fuller & Sons
- Builder: Rock Davis, Blackwall, NSW
- Launched: 6 August 1891
- Fate: Sank at moorings in March 1925.

General characteristics
- Type: Wooden-hulled coastal freighter
- Tonnage: 277 GRT 170 NRT
- Length: 131 feet (40 m)
- Beam: 25 feet (7.6 m)
- Draught: 11 feet (3.4 m)
- Installed power: Triple-compound Steam 350 h.p.
- Speed: 10 knots
- Crew: ?

Dunmore was a wooden-hulled steamship of the coastal trade in Australia, and was one of the Stone Fleet. The ship also carried coal, standing in on occasion as a 'sixty-miler' collier of the coastal coal-carrying trade of New South Wales. She was mainly used on the run between Bass Point and Sydney, during the years from 1891 to 1922. During that period, she survived a number of collisions and other incidents, but developed a reputation as an unlucky ship, at least for the other vessels with which she collided.

This ship is not to be confused with its similarly-named contemporaries, the trans-Atlantic steam freighter and eventual ghost ship, Dunmore, built in 1884, and the four-masted steel-hulled barque, Earl of Dunmore (later Spartan)—also built in 1891 and which was also a visitor to Sydney Harbour.

== The Stone Fleet ==
'Stone Fleet' was the colloquial name for the small coastal ships that carried crushed stone ('blue metal') to Sydney from the Illawarra ports of Kiama and Shellharbour and the nearby ocean jetties at Bombo and Bass Point. This coastal shipping trade was known as the 'Stone Trade" or 'Blue Diamond Trade'.

In the earliest years of the coastal trade, the "Stone Fleet" ships were sailing vessels. These were quickly supplanted by small coal-fired steamers designed to carry bulk cargo. The steamers in the earlier years of the trade were relatively small, wooden ships, like Civility, built in 1872, Dunmore, built in 1891—both from the Rock Davis shipyard—and Resolute, built in New Zealand in 1883.

== Details ==
=== Owner ===
Dunmore (first) was owned by the Fuller family (G.L. Fuller & Sons), operators of the quarry at Bass Point (then known as Long Point), and remained owned by them during her working life. She was later owned by the company that the Fullers controlled, South Coast Metal Quarries Ltd.

=== Name ===
The name Dunmore has strong associations with the Fuller family. Dunmore, County Galway was the birthplace of George Lawrence Fuller (1832–1917). Dunmore was also the name of the locality where the Fuller family settled near Shellharbour, and their home there was 'Dunmore House'.

=== Design and construction ===
Dunmore was purpose designed for the 'blue metal' trade by Sydney marine engineer, John Wildridge, of J. Wildridge & Sinclair Ltd. William Sinclair of the same firm designed the ill-fated sixty-miler, Undola. Dunmore was built at the Rock Davis shipyard, at Blackwall, on Brisbane Water. Her engine was built by Muir and Hanson, of Glasgow. Her engine and equipment were fitted by William Grant and Messrs. McCredie and Sons, Pyrmont.

=== Description ===
She had two masts, and was fore-and-aft rigged as a schooner, making her what was known as an auxiliary steamer. The masts could also be used during unloading.

Her hull was constructed from 'colonial hardwood' with kauri deck planking. There was top-gallant forecastle for accommodating her crew, and a bridgehouse amid ship, with rooms for officers, and at her aft was a small saloon and storeroom. She had a single hold, 11 feet deep, accommodating 300 tons of 'blue metal'.

Her engine was a triple-compound reciprocating steam engine, with surface condenser, of 358 indicated horsepower. The three cylinders were of 12 inch 20 inch and 32½ inch diameters respectively. all with 24 inch stroke. Her steel boiler had a steam pressure of 160 p.s.i.

== Service history ==
=== Regular service ===
Dunmore was mainly used on the run between the jetty of Fuller's quarry at Long Point (now Bass Point) and Sydney. The wooden jetty was constructed, around 1880, to load crushed stone from the adjacent quarry. The jetty was 500 feet long. In 1904, Dunmore was berthing there four times a week, and each time would load 300 tons of crushed stone gravel, in under two hours.

=== Other service ===
Like most Stone Fleet ships, Dunmore occasionally carried cargoes of coal, in the coastal coal-carrying trade.

In mid-1918, Dunmore left the local coastal trade, and she was then used on interstate routes, but was back on the run from Shellharbour to Sydney, by early 1921.

=== Incidents ===
==== Equipment failure (1894) ====
During a westerly gale, Dunmore was steaming north, passing Coalcliff, in September 1894, when her tailshaft and propeller unexpectedly came loose and were lost. Her crew hoisted as much sail as they could on her masts, and sailed the fully-laden, disabled steamer to Sydney.

She arrived off Sydney Heads around 9:00 p.m., and beat against the strong westerly wind to enter Sydney Harbour. It took until around 2:00 a.m., before she was anchored, adjacent to the Old Man's Hat rock formation (near the North Head Quarantine Station). After dawn, she was towed to Pyrmont, where she unloaded, and then taken for repair. It would be just one of many incidents that Dunmore would survive over her time as a coastal steamer.

==== Rescue of Norman's crew (1895) ====
In August 1895, the schooner Norman, carrying a cargo of 81 tons of coal from Wollongong, ran onto the easternmost point of Bellambi Reef. Her crew were picked up by Dunmore. Norman quickly broke up, becoming another victim of the notorious reef.

==== Collision with Brighton (1898) ====
In January 1898, near Bradley's Head, Dunmore was struck on her rails by the side paddle box of the Manly ferry Brighton. Neither vessel sustained significant damage and both continued on their way.

==== Collision with Kelloe (1902) ====
Dunmore had a narrow escape after she collided with a much larger ship, the steel-hulled 'sixty-miler' Kelloe, two miles off the Botany Bay heads in May 1902. She was running unladen for Shellharbour at around 1:30 am. Kelloe, owned by Wallarah Coal Co., was inbound for Sydney, carrying 600 tons of coal from the South Bulli jetty at Bellambi.

Dunmore struck Kelloe on her starboard side in the area of her hold. Kelloe filled quickly and sank within 15 minutes. Dunmore picked up the Kelloe's crew and made it through the heads of Botany Bay, where she was only saved by being beached at Kurnell.

An inquiry into the incident found the second mate of Kelloe was responsible for the collision, by not keeping a proper look out. Having had very little sleep in the previous 24 hours, a conclusion was that he had dozed off, only awaking when it was already too late. Due to his previous good record, no action was taken against him.

==== Gunfire: friendly and unfriendly fire (1906-1907) ====
In March 1906, infantrymen of the headquarters companies of the 1st Australian Infantry Regiment Militia were practising shooting, at what is now ANZAC Rifle Range. As required, an advertisement had been placed in the newspaper and a red danger flag was flying from the headland as a warning. However, the submarine mining vessel Miner, which usually cruised about in the area during shooting practice was absent. Dunmore continued on her course close to the coast and, as she passed passed seaward from the range, she received a fusillade of copper-jacketed bullets. One bullet passed through a cork lifebuoy, through the bridge and penetrated a lifeboat, before embedding itself in the wooden covering of a copper air tank. Dunmore's mate, who moments before had been leaning against the ship's telegraph, had a narrow escape. Another bullet passed through a 4-inch manila rope in the aft of the ship.

June 1907 saw another shooting incident, while the Dunmore was discharging coal at Blackwattle Bay. A coal lumper, who had once been a seaman on the ship, Giovanni Embornone, fired two shots at another coal lumper, Charles Hansen, and was later charged.

==== Naval disaster (1909) ====
Dunmore collided with a naval pinnace (or ship's boat) off Mrs Macquarie's Point in Sydney Harbour in January 1909, resulting in the drowning of 15 sailors from HMS Encounter.

At around 6:45 am, 67 sailors were in the boat, being towed by a steam launch owned by Garden Island Naval Depot, en route to the Man o' War landing. Dunmore was inbound for the gravel wharf at Woolloomooloo Bay. The Dunmore struck first the towline and then the boat, off Mrs Macquaries Point.

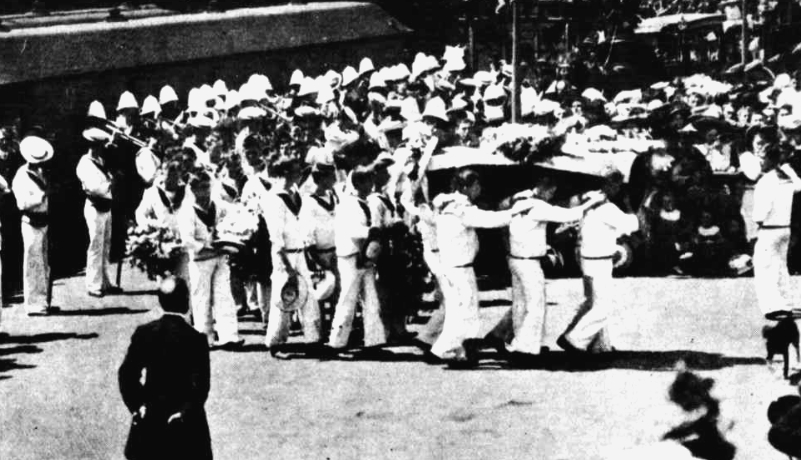
Coffins of sailors drowned in the collision, at Central railway station, en route to Rookwood Cemetery.

The sailors had been going ashore for rifle practice, and were carrying rifles slung across their backs, carrying ammunition packs and wearing leggings, preventing some from surviving in the water. An observer aboard Dunmore described the sailors as "triced up like stuffed chickens". But for the crews of Dunmore and the navy launch rapidly rescuing survivors, the death toll would have been even greater. Three sailors were revived using artificial respiration, after being pulled apparently lifeless from the water. The practice of sailors slinging arms while in boats was later ended, as a lesson taken from the disaster. The coxwain steering the naval launch was tried on a charge of manslaughter and acquitted.

A large crowd watched the funeral procession from Man o' War steps, along Macquarie and Elizabeth Streets to Central Station, where the 15 coffins were put aboard a funeral train. The fifteen sailors lie in a combined gravesite, fifty feet wide, marked with a memorial, in the Anglican Naval section of Rookwood Cemetery.

==== Collision with Lady Hopetoun (1910) ====
In November 1910, almost at the same location as the previous collision in 1909, Dunmore collided with the steam launch, Lady Hopetoun. The steam launch had some slight damage.

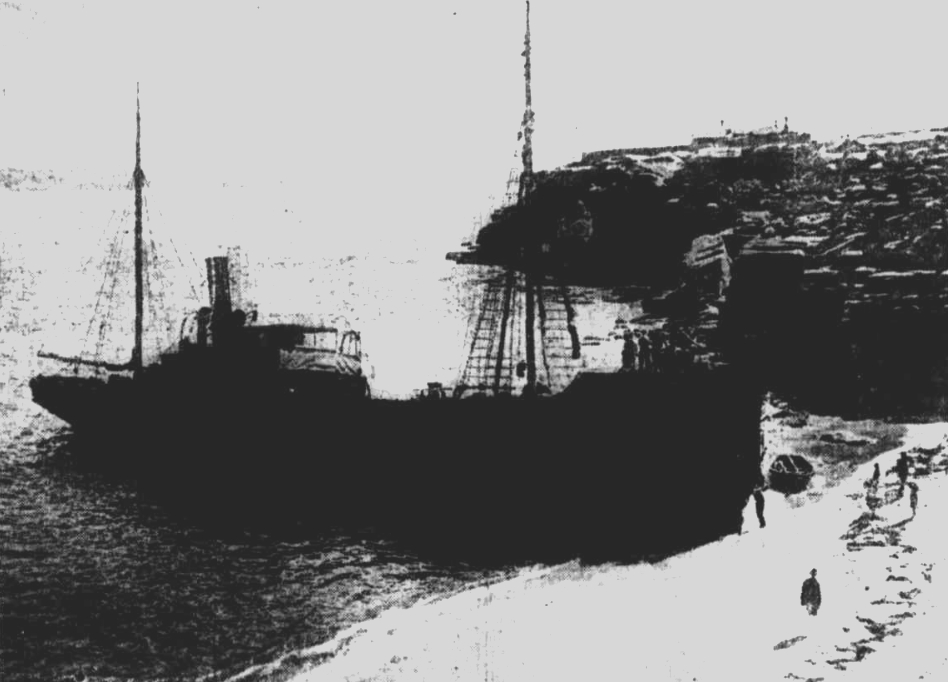
Dunmore beached at Lady Bay, after the collision with Kiama, in 1914.

==== Collision with Kiama (1914) ====
Outbound from Sydney, Dunmore was involved in another collision, in April 1914, off the Heads of Sydney Harbour; this time she collided with another 'Stone Fleet' ship, the steel-hull Kiama, which was inbound and fully-laden with crushed stone at around 1:00 a.m. Although Dunmore was left with a gaping hole in her bow and was taking in water, her watertight bulkhead held and she remained afloat long enough to be beached at Lady Bay.

A Marine Court found that the master of Dunmore was largely responsible by not keeping a proper lookout and not obeying navigation regulations, but also found the mate of Kiama partly responsible. He had not reversed Kiama's engine, once a collision was otherwise unavoidable. However, the court did not have jurisdiction over Kiama, a government vessel, and only Dunmore's master was disciplined, by the suspension of his master's certificate.

==== Collision with Southborough and grounding (1915) ====
In August 1915, while leaving the harbour at Port Kembla, the ship Southborough struck Dunmore, which was lying at anchor there. Both ships suffered minor damage.

In September 1915, the Dunmore was carrying a cargo of coal when she ran aground on a reef near Bradley's Head, during a fog. She sustained little damage. After transferring her cargo to lighters, was successfully refloated and used her own engine to pull herself clear of the reef.

==== Collision with Champion ====
In February 1918, the Dunmore was involved in another collision—this time with the tug Champion—and sustained damage; a Court of Marine Inquiry found the Champion's master responsible.

==== Wharf incidents ====
In May 1898, a man working in the hold of the ship, while she was being unloaded at Pyrmont, was seriously injured when a basket of 'blue metal' dropped onto him.

In June 1911, a wharf labourer fell from a suspended plank onto the wharf at Pyrmont, while unloading gravel from Dunmore. Although he kept working at the time, around three weeks later he died in Sydney Hospital, as a result of injuries received in the fall.

=== Final years and end of Dunmore ===
On 3 January 1922, a southerly gale wrecked the jetty at Bass Point. It would not reopen until mid 1927. Shellharbour—the port of Shellharbour—was a port that was difficult to use, for all but the smallest vessels and even these needed captains with local knowledge. Dunmore was still on the run to Shellharbour as late as the end of February 1923.

In March 1925, after a period of inactivity, Dunmore sprang a leak and sank at her moorings in Waterview Bay, Balmain.

== Aftermath ==
=== Second World War ===
There was an interruption to the stone trade during the Second World War, when Paterson and Bombo were requisitioned for wartime service. The quarries and narrow-gauge railway at Kiama closed permanently at this time. Around the same time, the Bass Point quarry and jetty also closed. Shipping operations resumed from Kiama in 1947, but Bass Point jetty operations did not resume until a new jetty there opened in 1973.

=== The second Dunmore and end of Kiama port operations ===
A new steel-hulled MV Dunmore (ex-Nassau) entered service in 1951, with Kiama as its home port. There was another ship, still at work in 1959, MV Bass Point (ex-Betoeran), which—like MV Dunmore (ex-Nassau)—was formerly a Dutch East Indies oil tanker. These vessels were owned by the Lancey Shipping Company.

In 1960, the N.S.W. Government reduced the rail freight charge for 'blue metal' carried from Port Kembla, from 36 shillings per ton to 15 shillings per ton, effectively making the shipping operations at Kiama uneconomic.

MV Dunmore took the last shipment of 'blue metal' from Kiama on 21 December 1961, then became redundant. She was sold (c. 1962–1963) and renamed Fijian Trader, under which name she ran aground and was wrecked in 1964. The hoppers at the Robertson Basin were demolished in 1965.
