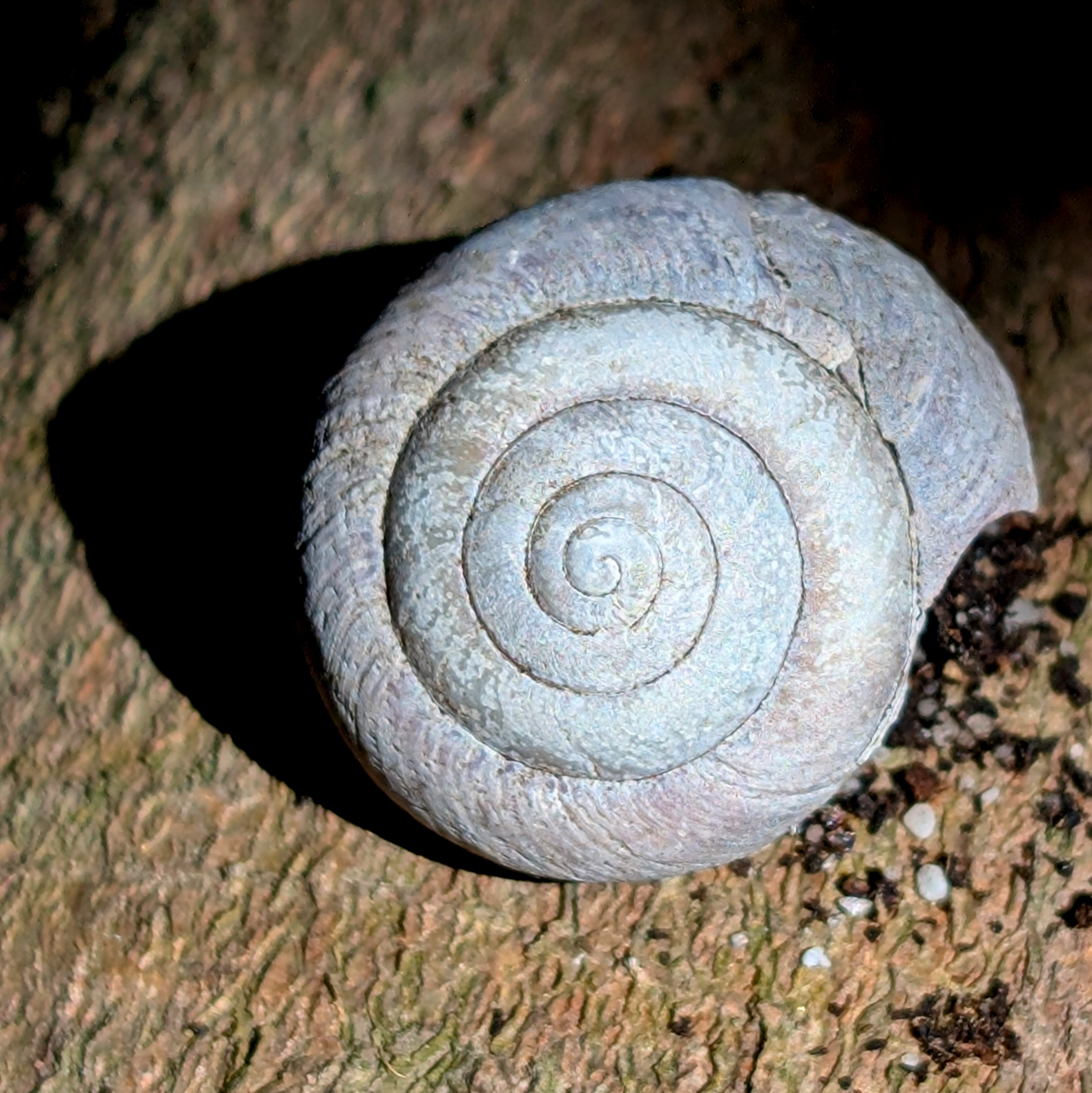
- Bass Point Reserve, Australia

Scientific classification
- Kingdom: Animalia
- Phylum: Mollusca
- Class: Gastropoda
- Order: Stylommatophora
- Family: Camaenidae
- Genus: Sauroconcha
- Species: S. gulosa

Binomial name
- Sauroconcha gulosa (A.Gould, 1846)

Synonyms
- Helix coriaria L.Pfeiffer, 1847; Helix gulosa A.Gould, 1846; Helix scotti J.C.Cox, 1864; Meridolum gulosum (A.Gould, 1846); Thersites gulosa (A.Gould, 1846)

= Sauroconcha gulosa =

Illawarra forest snail

Species of mollusc

Sauroconcha gulosa, the Illawarra forest snail is an air-breathing land snail, a terrestrial pulmonate gastropod in the family Camaenidae.

== Description ==
(Described in Latin as Helix coriaria) The shell is depressed-globose, solid and has a slightly concealed umbilicus. Its surface is roughly wrinkled and has a very fine granular texture, all in a clear chestnut color. The spire is broadly conical and obtuse.

It consists of five slightly convex whorls, with the body whorl being somewhat deflected at the front. The aperture is roundly lunate and has a pearlescent interior. The peristome is straight and obtuse, with its margins set far apart.

The columellar margin is sloping, thickened, and reflected. At the top, it widens into a triangular lamina that almost completely conceals the umbilicus.

== Distribution ==
This species is found in forests and woodlands, in New South Wales, from the Southern Highlands to the South Coast.
