= Hobart City Hall =

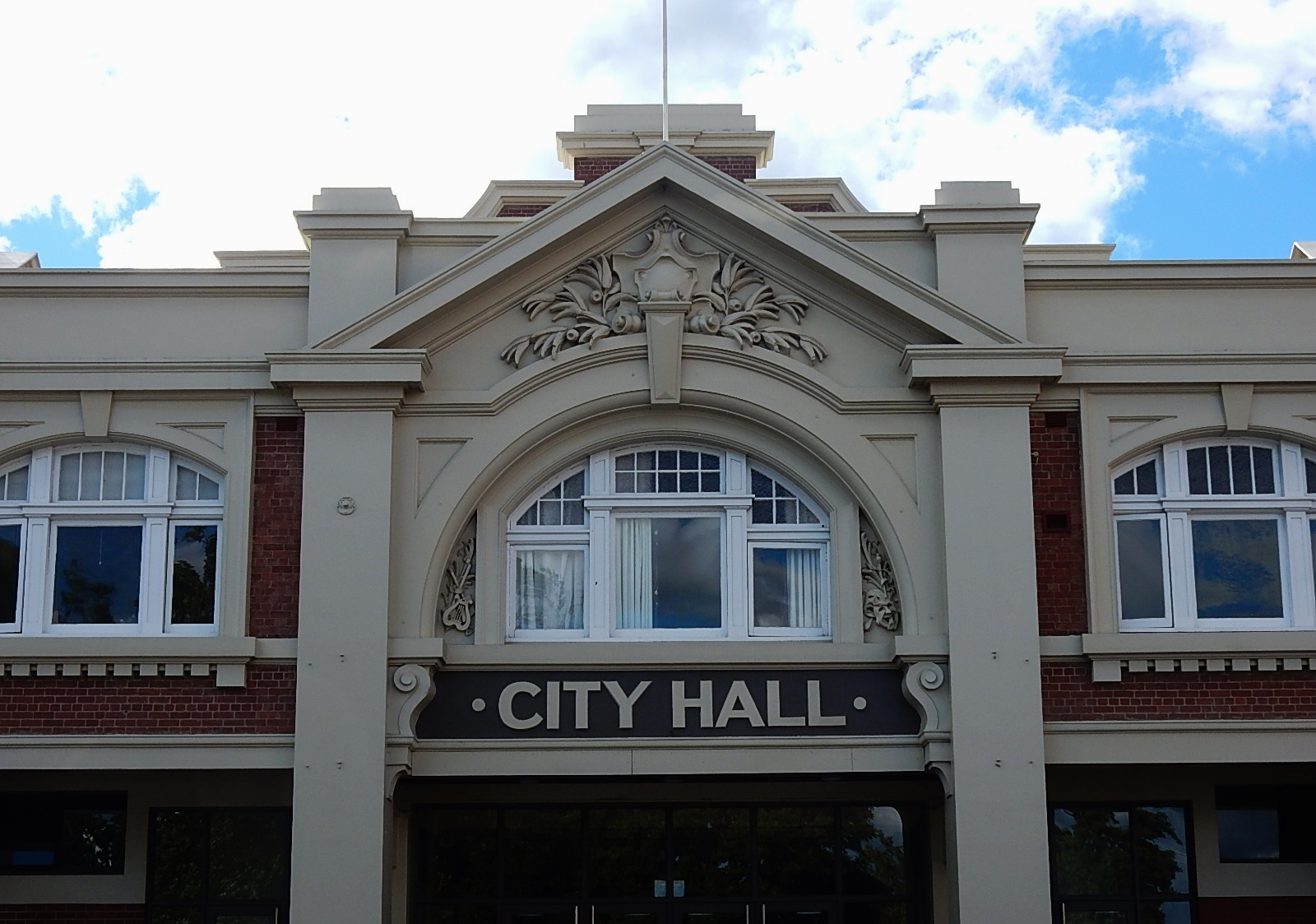
- Facade of Hobart City Hall
- Interactive map of the Hobart City Hall area

General information
- Location: Hobart, Tasmania, Australia
- Coordinates: 42.88070°S 147.33182°E
- Inaugurated: 1915
- Owner: Hobart City Council

Hobart City Hall is a public auditorium and concert venue in Hobart, Tasmania, which together with the Derwent Entertainment Centre forms one of the two major public venues in the city. It is also a commonly used emergency center during disasters such as the 2013 Tasmanian bushfires. Despite its name it is not the City of Hobart's seat of government, which is Hobart Town Hall – historically a matter of confusion.

== History ==
Prior to the erection of the hall, the area where it stands was reserved for city markets. The building was designed by Raymond ("Rusty") N Butler in association with Flack Ricards and Frank Heyward and the building cost £27,000. The City Hall was completed in 1915, with a formal opening in July. It was reported as being capable of seating 5,000 people when it opened. In 1940, there were attempts to convert the hall to an indoor ice rink, however it was delayed indefinitely after the City Hall was commandeered by the army in 1940 for six months to use for storage. In 1952 it held what was at the time the largest sports carnival ever held in Tasmania, as part of an appeal by the Olympic Council to raise funds for sending Australian athletes to Helsinki Olympics.

== Usage ==
The City Hall has served as a venue for many diverse events, including boxing matches, the 1949 Australian Basketball Championships, silent movie screenings, a ball for the Queen and the Duke of Edinburgh, speeches from the Duke of Gloucester, and Miss Tasmania and Miss Australia Grand Finals. Today it also forms part of the network of locations for the Festival of Voices.

== Gallery ==
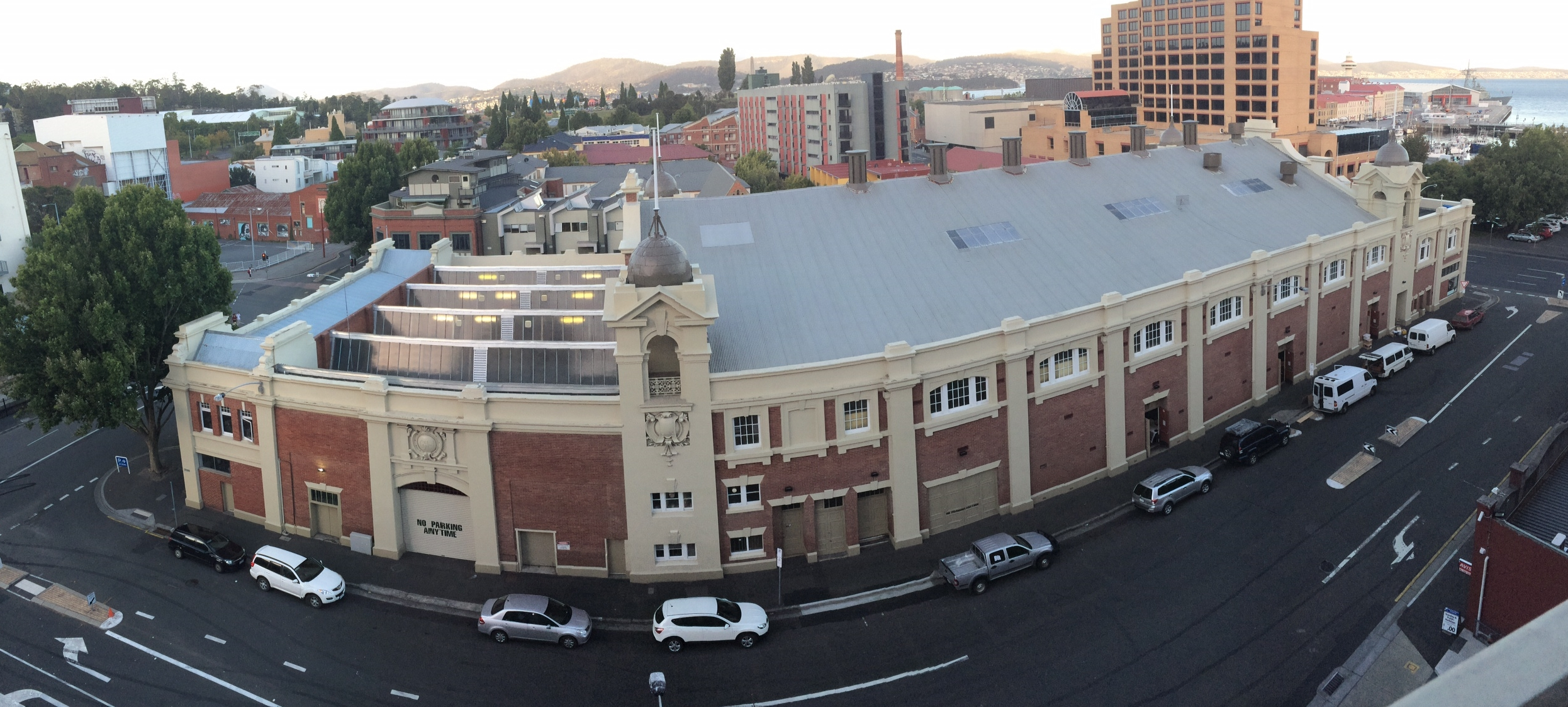
City Hall panorama from Campbell Street in 2015
