= Colin Dunmore Fuller =

Australian soldier

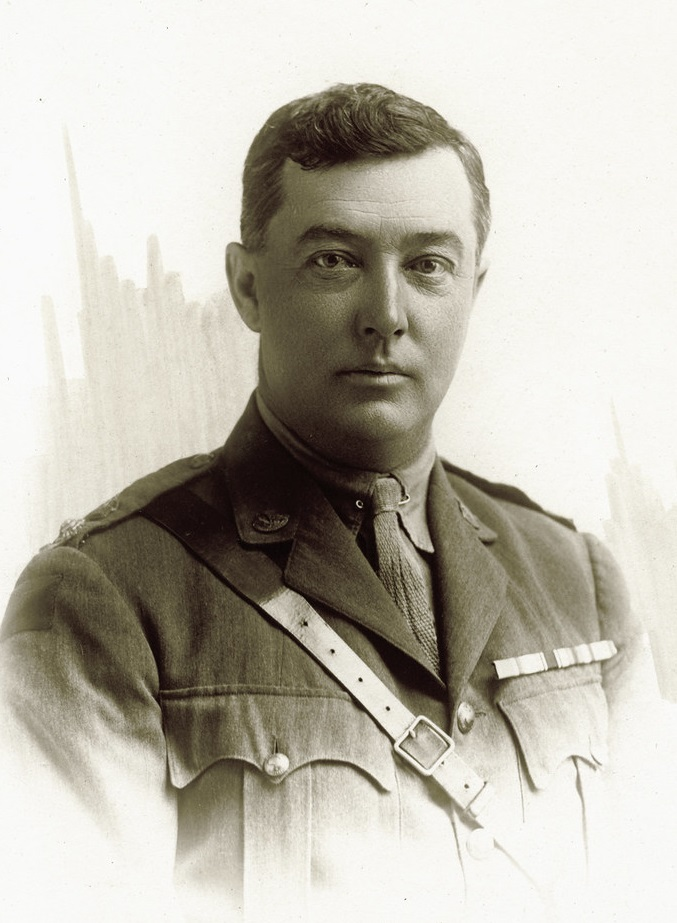
- Colin Dunmore Fuller
- Born: 1882; Australia
- Died: 1953; Australia
- Occupation(s): Farmer and soldier

Colin Dunmore Fuller (1882–1953) was an Australian farmer and soldier who served in World War One.

== Biography ==
He was born on 10 February 1882 in Kiama, New South Wales.

He was the son of George Lawrence Fuller.

His eldest brother George Warburton Fuller was the 22nd Premier of New South Wales.

He married Amy Elsie Blanche Rea at St Luke's Anglican Church, Mosman, Sydney on 10 March 1920.

He died of lung cancer on 19 September 1953 in Sydney, Australia.

His cemetery is at the Woronora Memorial Park, Sutherland, New South Wales.

== Education ==
He completed his schooling at the Sydney Church of England Grammar School.

== Career ==
In his youth, he worked as a horseman and a farmer.

=== Military career ===
He enlisted as a lieutenant in the 6th Light Horse Regiment (Australia) and rose through the ranks to become a lieutenant colonel. He commanded the unit during the Gallipoli Campaign.

== Awards and honours ==
He was Mentioned in Despatches for his military service.

For his military services, he was published in The London Gazette. He also received a Distinguished Service Order at the 1917 New Year Honours.

He also received an Order of the Nile award for his services in World War One.
