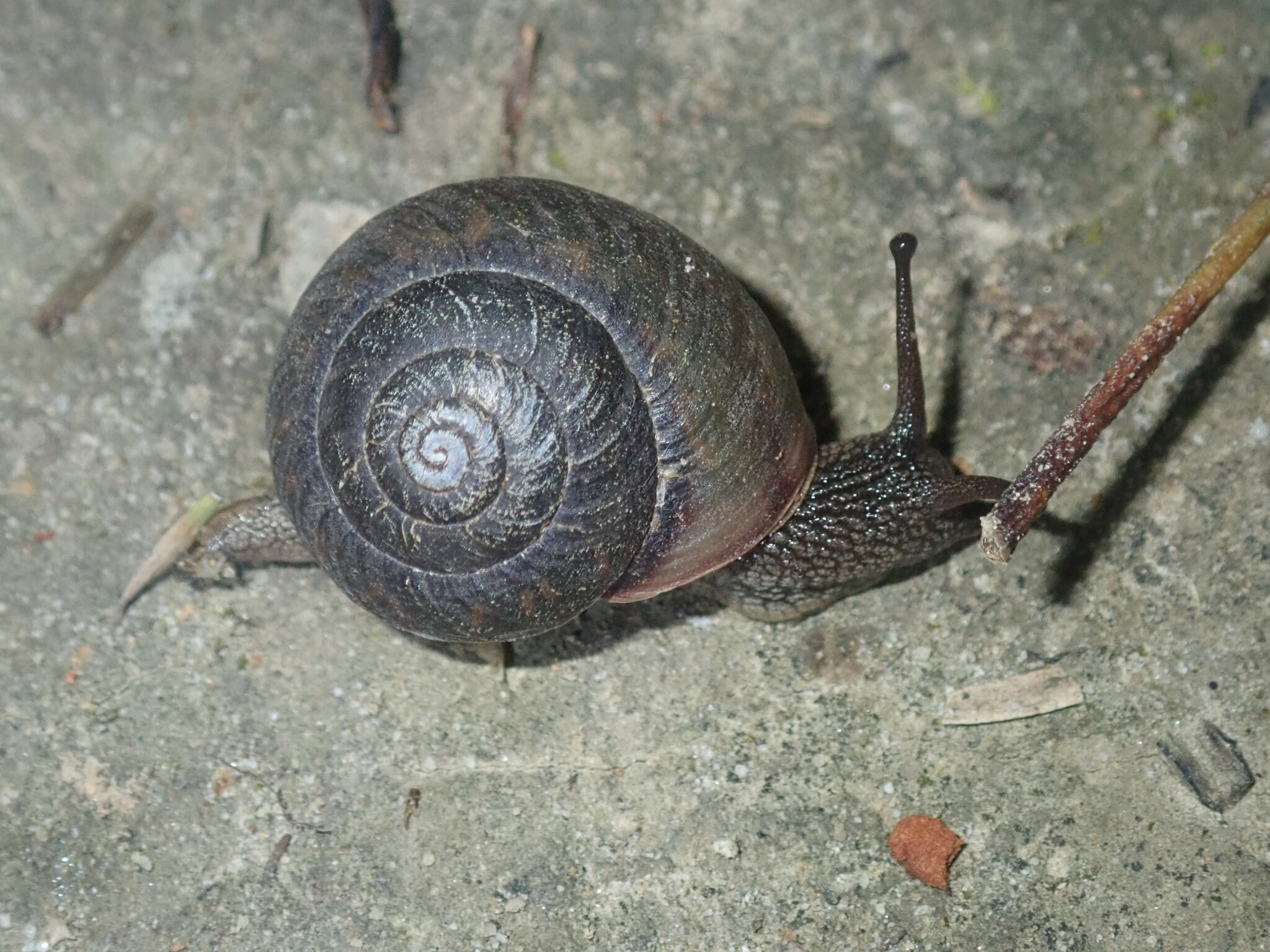

Scientific classification
- Kingdom: Animalia
- Phylum: Mollusca
- Class: Gastropoda
- Order: Stylommatophora
- Family: Camaenidae
- Genus: Sauroconcha
- Species: S. sheai

Binomial name
- Sauroconcha sheai (S. A. Clark, 2009)

= Sauroconcha sheai =

Species of mollusc

Sauroconcha sheai (common name - Woronora woodland snail) is a species of air-breathing land snails, terrestrial pulmonate gastropod molluscs in the family Camaenidae. The species was first described in 2009 by Stephanie Clark as Meridolum sheai.

It is found in New South Wales, from the Woronora plateau to Auburn, NSW in forests and woodlands under logs and rocks.
