= Elizabeth Macquarie =

Australian settler and First Lady of New South Wales

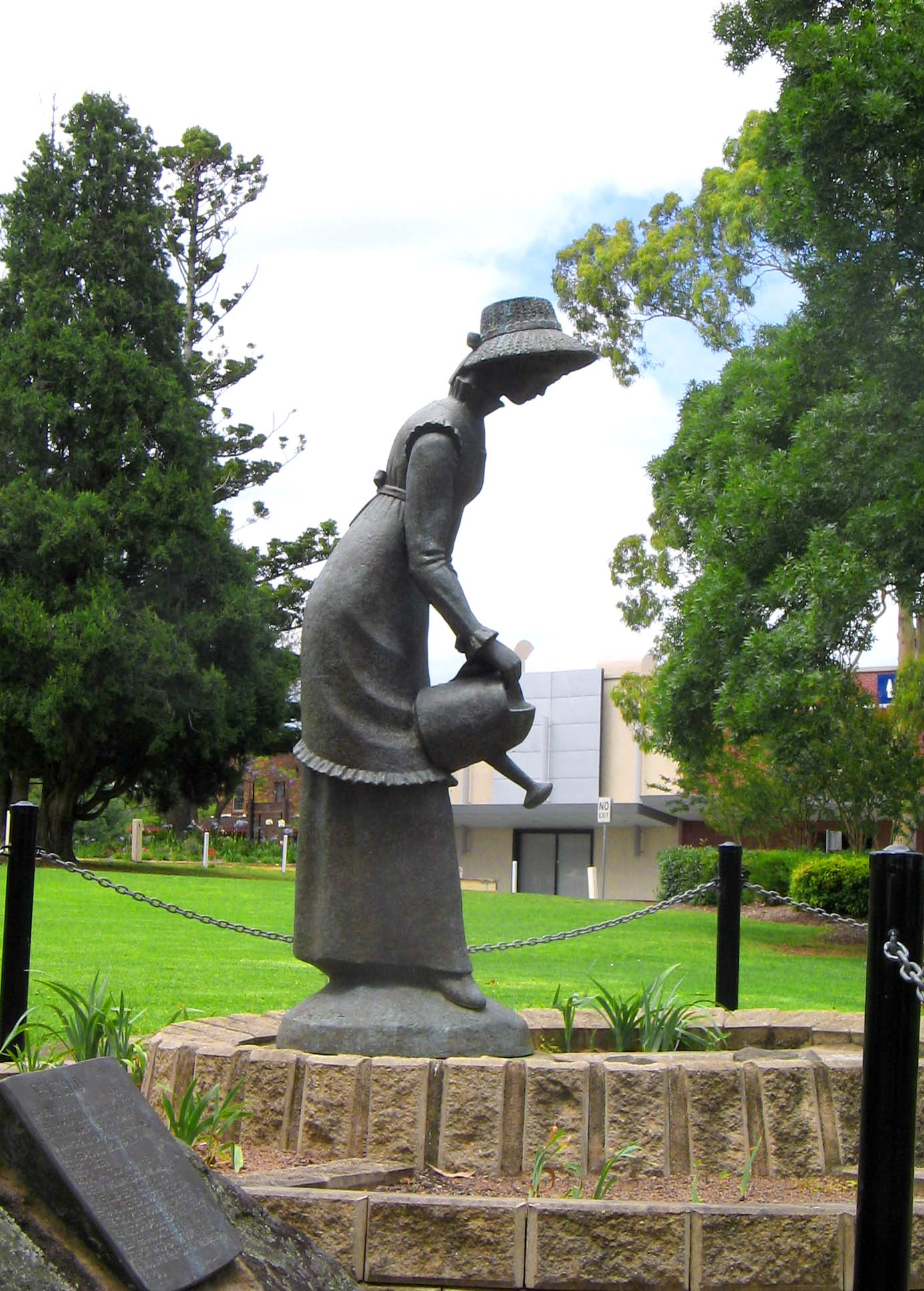
- Elizabeth Macquarie Statue, Mawson Park, Campbelltown
- Born: Elizabeth Henrietta Campbell; 13 June 1778; Kilcalmonell, Argyll and Bute, Scotland
- Died: 11 March 1835 (aged 56); Mull, Scotland
- Spouse: Lachlan Macquarie
- Children: Jane (15 September - 5 December 1808); Lachlan (March 28, 1814 - May 1845)

Elizabeth Macquarie (née Elizabeth Henrietta Campbell; 1778–1835) was the second wife of Lachlan Macquarie, who served as Governor of New South Wales from 1810 to 1821. She played a significant role in the establishment of the colony and is recognised in the naming of many Australian landmarks including Mrs Macquarie's Chair and Elizabeth Street, Hobart. Governor Macquarie named the town (now city) of Campbelltown, New South Wales after his wife's maiden name and a statue of her now stands in Mawson Park, Campbelltown.

== Biography ==
Born Elizabeth Henrietta Campbell, she was the youngest daughter of John Campbell of Airds, Scotland. A distant cousin of Macquarie's she first met him at the age of 26 when he was an army officer. They were married three years later in 1807. Shortly after, in 1809, he was appointed to the governorship of New South Wales and she followed him. She is said to have taken a particular interest in the of women convicts and indigenous people as well as helping pioneer hay-making in the colony. Elizabeth's Library of books on architecture were used by her husband and by architect Francis Greenway in the planning of government buildings.

During her time in Australia she traveled to Tasmania in 1811, across the Blue Mountains in 1815, and in 1818 to the Hunter River.

At the end of her husband's term, she returned with him to Scotland in 1823, living at the Macquarie estate of Jarvisfield on the Isle of Mull. The Macquaries had two children, Jane, a girl who died in infancy, and Lachlan, a boy. Jane was born in Perth, Scotland, on 15 September 1808, but died aged 3 months. The younger Lachlan was born in Sydney in 1814, married Isabella Campbell in 1836, and died without children in May 1845, aged 31.

Following her husband's death in London in 1824, Macquarie lived with a £400 pension from the British government. From 1825 to 1828 she lived in Surrey and Middlesex, spending summers at Jarvisfield. In 1828-29 she lived in London at 58 Upper Charlotte Street in a house that was bequeathed to her by her friend Henrietta Meredith. In 1830 she moved to Aberdeen, returning to Jarvisfield the next year when her husband purchased a commission in the Army. She died at Gruline House on 11 March 1835, and was posthumously granted 2,000 acres (810 ha) of land in New South Wales.

In her own words, a collection of her journal writings and letters transcribed and annotated by Robin Walsh, was published in 2011.

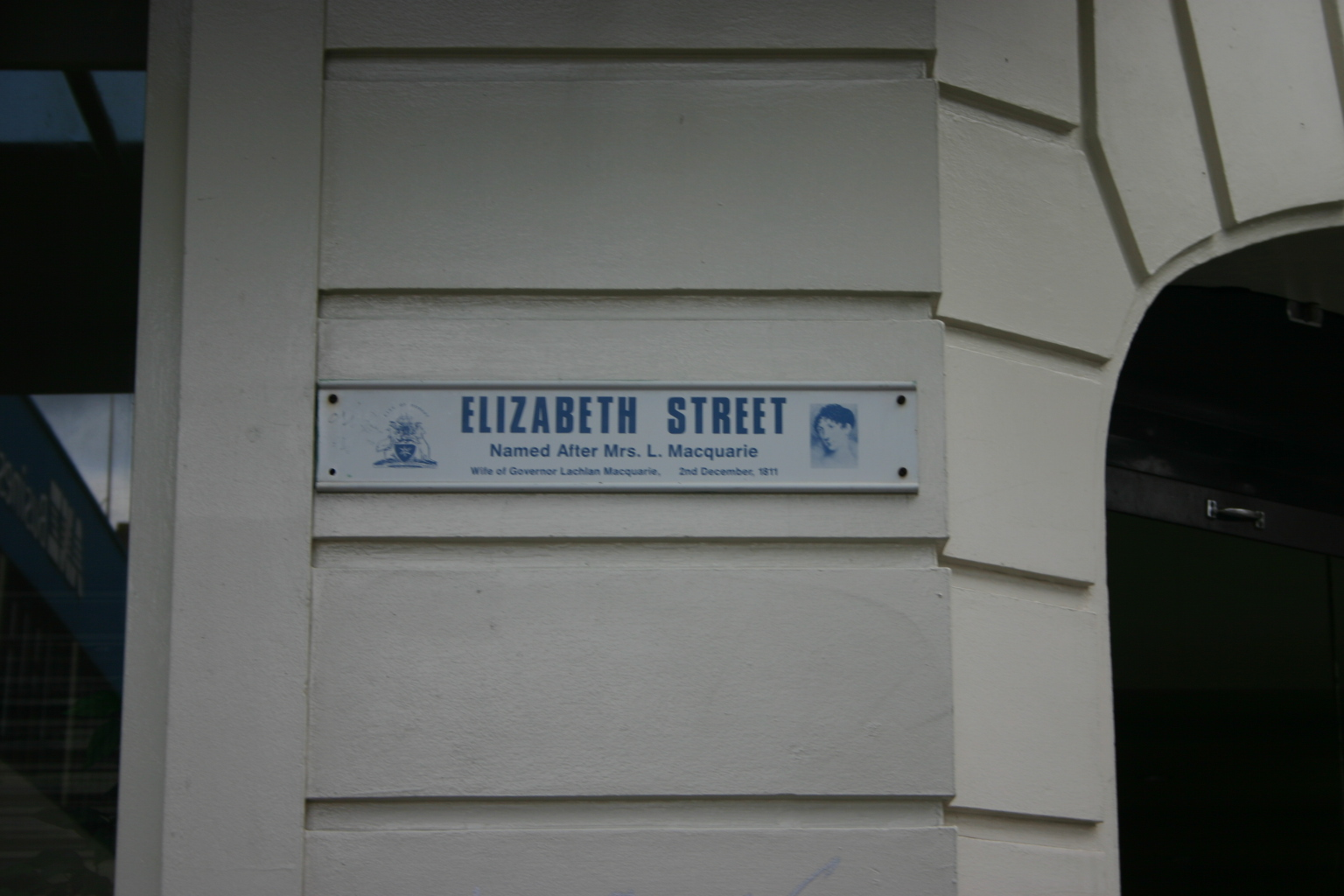
Street sign on Elizabeth Street, Hobart

== Places named in her honour ==
- Elizabeth Street, a principal street of Hobart, Tasmania
- Campbell Street, a principal street of Hobart, Tasmania
- Elizabeth Street, Sydney, one of the principal streets of Sydney
- Elizabeth Bay, a bay of Port Jackson and suburb of Sydney
- Mrs Macquarie's Chair, a rock cut into a chair shape on Mrs Macquarie's Point, a peninsula in Port Jackson
- The original, no longer extant, Mrs Macquarie's Road, also known as Lady Macquarie's Road, which ran from the original Government House (now the Museum of Sydney) to Mrs Macquarie's Point
- Mrs Macquaries Road, a modern road in The Domain, Sydney
- Macquarie Culvert - a culvert under the original Mrs Macquarie's Road
- Campbelltown, New South Wales, a town founded in 1820, one of a series of settlements south-west of Sydney being established by Macquarie at that time
- Appin, New South Wales, a town founded in 1811, which takes its name from Appin, the Scottish West Highlands town where Elizabeth was born
- Airds, New South Wales, a suburb in south-western Sydney, which takes its name from Elizabeth's Scottish family estate. This is to be distinguished from the District of Airds, a name given by Governor Macquarie, in use still in the name of the Campbelltown and Airds Historical Society.
- Meredith Island off the coast of New South Wales, reportedly named after a friend of Macquarie
- A statue of Macquarie by Tom Bass, in Mawson Park in Campbelltown, New South Wales
