= Macquarie Culvert =

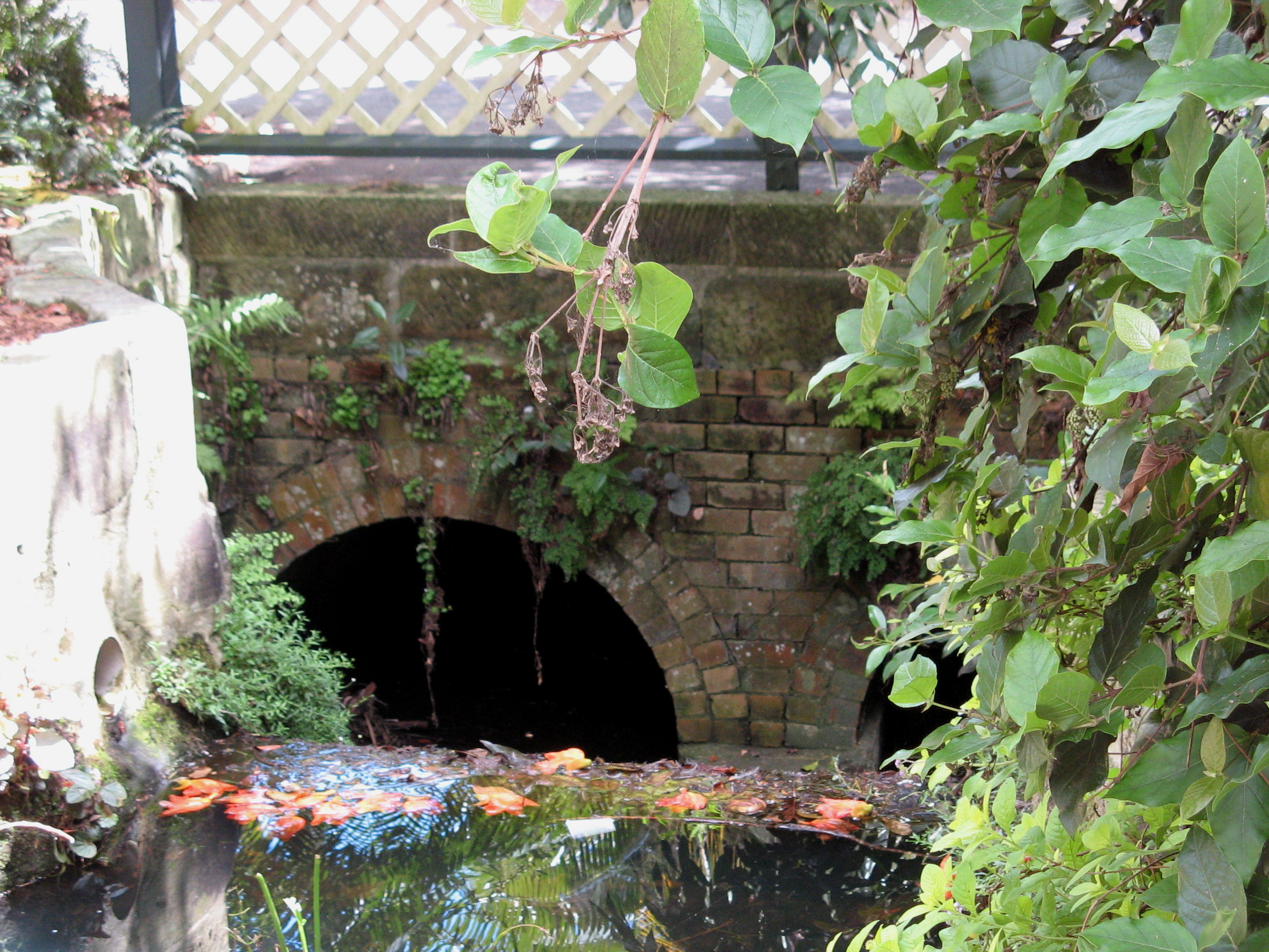
- Coordinates: 33°51′54″S 151°13′1.7″E
- Carries: Pedestrian traffic
- Locale: Royal Botanic Gardens, The Domain, Sydney, New South Wales, Australia
- Official name: Macquarie Culvert

History
- Construction start: 1813
- Construction end: 1816

Location
- Interactive map of Macquarie Culvert

The Macquarie Culvert is a double brick culvert under the original Mrs Macquarie's Road (also known as Lady Macquarie's Road) in the Royal Botanic Gardens in Sydney, Australia. The culvert was probably built at the same time as the original road, between 1813 and 1816, making it almost certainly the oldest bridge in Australia.

The original Mrs Macquarie's Road ran from the original Government House (now the Museum of Sydney) to Yurong or Anson Point, now known as Mrs Macquarie's Point. It was built on the instruction of Governor Lachlan Macquarie for the benefit of his wife Elizabeth. There is no other remaining evidence of the original road.

The culvert was restored in 2002.

== See also ==
- List of bridges in Sydney
- Mrs Macquarie's Chair
