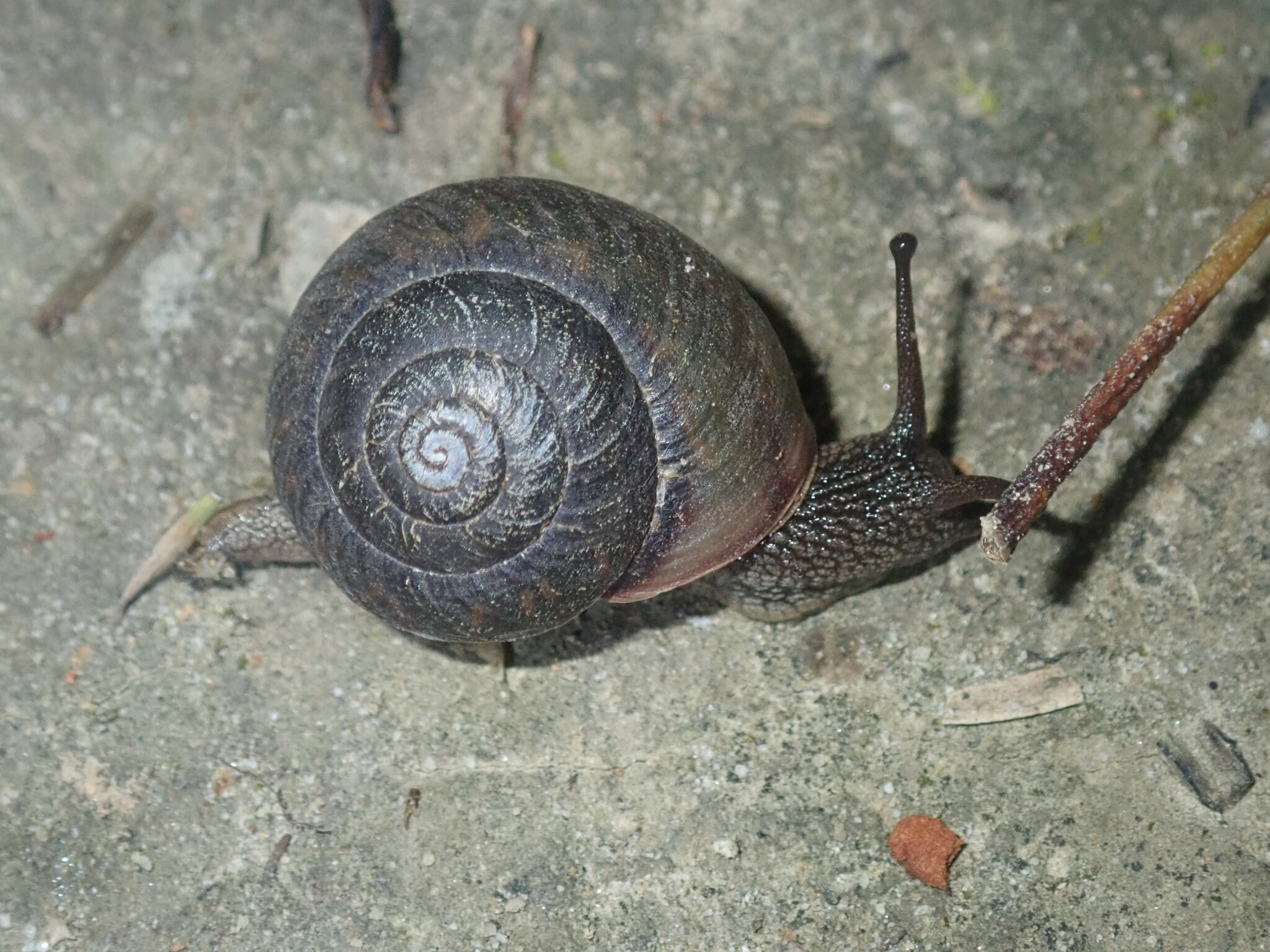
- Sauroconcha sheai

Scientific classification
- Domain: Eukaryota
- Kingdom: Animalia
- Phylum: Mollusca
- Class: Gastropoda
- Order: Stylommatophora
- Family: Camaenidae
- Genus: Sauroconcha; Zhang & Shea, 2008

= Sauroconcha =

Genus of gastropods

Sauroconcha is a genus of air-breathing land snails, terrestrial pulmonate gastropod molluscs in the family Camaenidae. The genus was first described in 2008 by Weihong Zhang and Michael Shea. The type species is Sauroconcha caperteeana.

== Species ==
Species accepted by WoRMS & within the genus Sauroconcha include:

- Sauroconcha caperteeana W.-H. Zhang & Shea, 2008
- Sauroconcha corneovirens (L. Pfeiffer, 1851)
- Sauroconcha grayi (L. Pfeiffer, 1847)
- Sauroconcha gulosa (A. Gould, 1846)
- Sauroconcha jervisensis (Quoy & Gaimard, 1832)
- Sauroconcha marshalli (McLauchlan, 1951)
- Sauroconcha maryae (S. A. Clark, 2009)
- Sauroconcha middenensis (McLauchlan, 1954)
- Sauroconcha sheai (S. A. Clark, 2009)
