= Sauroconcha caperteeana =

Scientific classification
- Domain: Eukaryota
- Kingdom: Animalia
- Phylum: Mollusca
- Class: Gastropoda
- Order: Stylommatophora
- Family: Camaenidae
- Genus: Sauroconcha
- Species: S. caperteeana

Binomial name
- Sauroconcha caperteeana Zhang & Shea, 2008

Species of mollusc

Sauroconcha caperteeana is a species of air-breathing land snails, terrestrial pulmonate gastropod molluscs in the family Camaenidae. The species was first described in 2008 by Weihong Zhang and Michael Shea.

It is found in the Capertee Valley of New South Wales, in rocky outcrops where it lives, under and among rocks.
