= Mrs Macquarie's Chair =

Sandstone rock in Sydney Harbour

Mrs Macquarie's Chair Lady Macquarie's Chair
- Rock formation
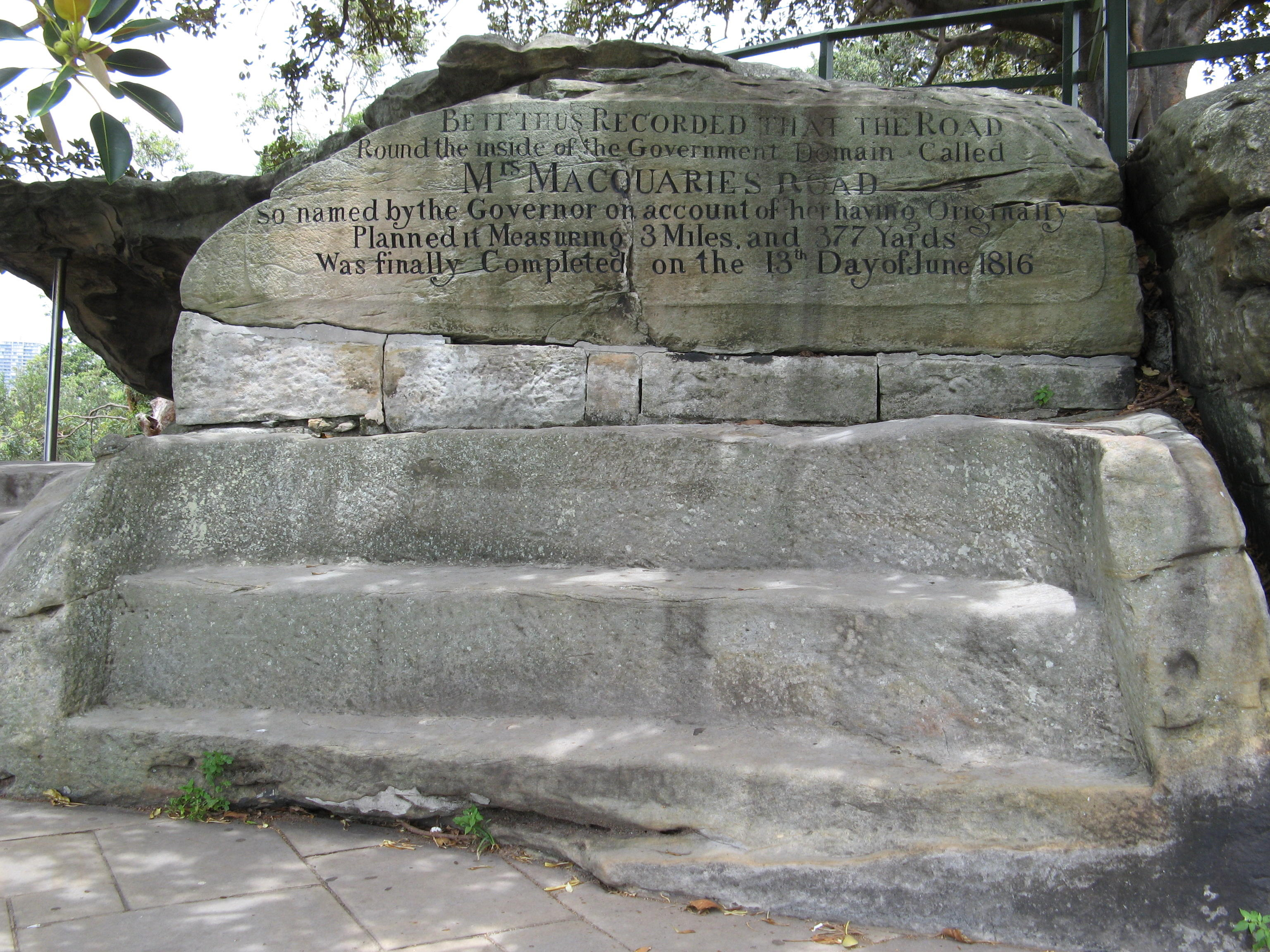
- Mrs Macquarie's Chair, near the Royal Botanic Gardens, Sydney

- Location within Sydney
- Coordinates: 33°51′34.08″S 151°13′19.93″E
- Location: The Domain, near the Royal Botanic Gardens, Sydney, New South Wales, Australia
- Part of: The Domain
- Water bodies: Port Jackson
- Geology: Sydney sandstone

Mrs Macquarie's Chair (also known as Lady Macquarie's Chair) is an exposed sandstone rock cut into the shape of a bench, on a peninsula in Sydney Harbour. It was hand carved by convicts in 1810, for Elizabeth Macquarie, the wife of Major-General Lachlan Macquarie, Governor of New South Wales. The peninsula itself was known to the Gadigal as Yurong Point, and is now widely known as Mrs Macquarie's Point, and is part of The Domain, near the Royal Botanic Gardens.

== Description ==
Mrs Macquarie was the wife of Major-General Lachlan Macquarie, Governor of New South Wales from 1810 to 1821. Folklore has it that she used to sit on the rock and watch for ships from Great Britain sailing into the harbour. She was known to visit the area and sit enjoying the panoramic views of the harbour.

Above the chair is a stone inscription referring to Mrs Macquarie's Road. That road was built between 1813 and 1818, and ran from the original Government House (now the Museum of Sydney) to Mrs Macquarie's Point. It was built on the instruction of Governor Macquarie for the benefit of his wife. There is no remaining evidence of the original road, other than a culvert over which the road ran—the Macquarie Culvert.

The stone inscription reads as follows.

Be it thus Recorded that the Road
Round the inside of the Government Domain Called
M^{rs.} Macquarie's road
So named by the Governor on account of her having Originally
Planned it Measuring 3 Miles, and 377 Yards
Was finally Completed on the 13th Day ofJune 1816

== Geography ==
The peninsula sits between the Garden Island peninsula to the east and Bennelong Point (where the Sydney Opera House resides) to the west. The chair itself faces north-east towards Fort Denison and the Tasman Sea. The area around it on Mrs Macquarie's Point is a popular lookout position for the view to the north-west of the Sydney Opera House and Sydney Harbour Bridge.

== See also ==
- List of public art in the City of Sydney
