= Campbell Street =

Road in Hobart, Tasmania

Campbell Street Tasmania
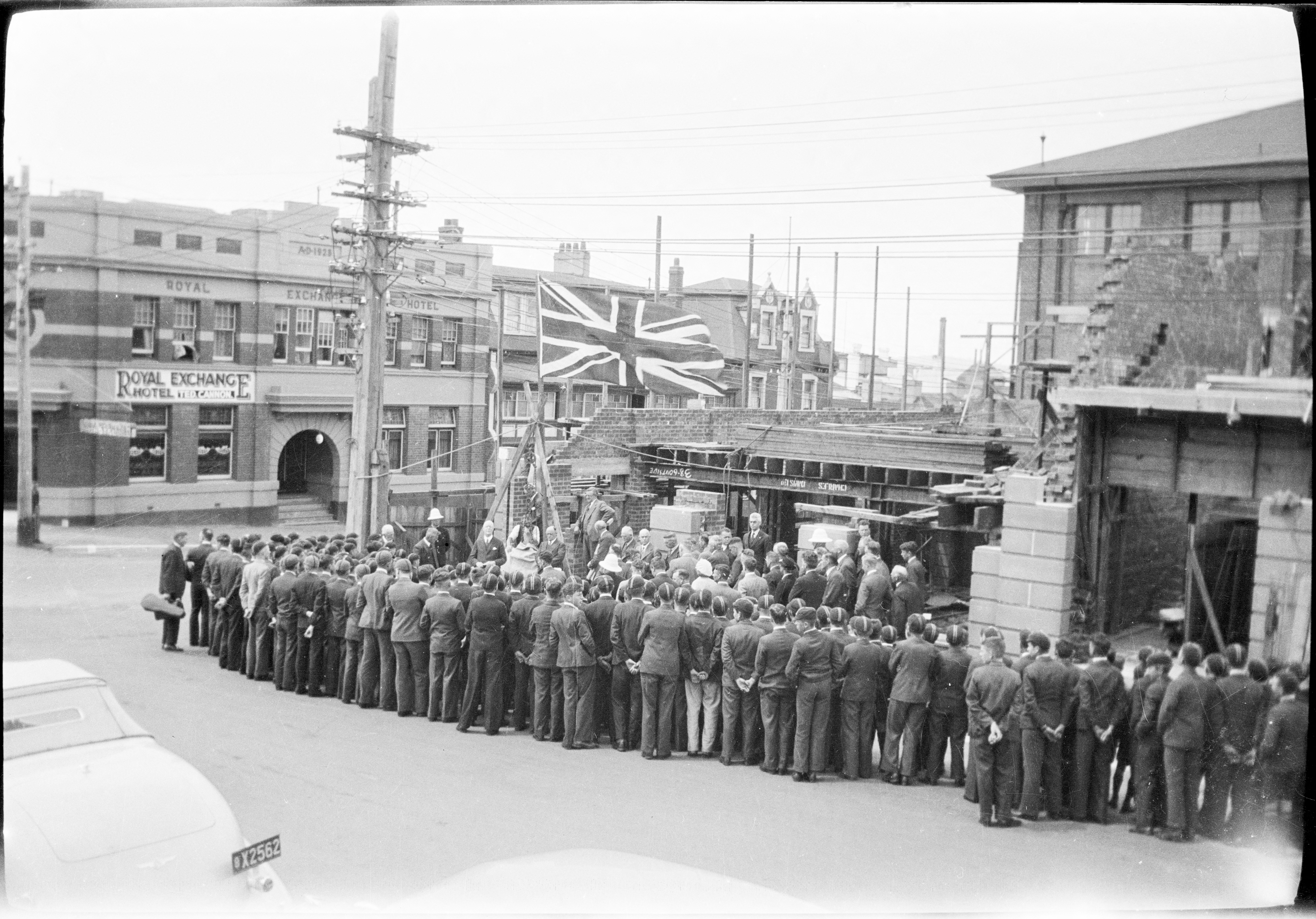
- Looking towards Campbell and Bathurst Street corner, from Bathurst Street c.1938

General information
- Type: Street
- Length: 1.4 km (0.9 mi)

Major junctions
- North-West end: Burnett Street
- South-West end: Davey Street

Location(s)
- Suburb(s): Hobart CBD, North Hobart

Campbell Street is a street in Hobart, Tasmania, Australia. It was named by Lachlan Macquarie for his wife, Elizabeth Campbell.
