= Bass Point (Australia) =

Headland in New South Wales, Australia

Coordinates: 34°35′50″S 150°54′0″E

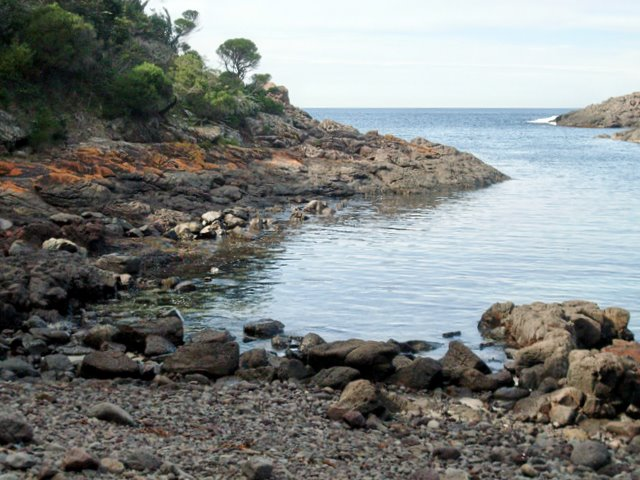
Bushrangers Bay at Bass Point

Bass Point is a headland in Australia on the New South Wales south coast.

The point was named by Matthew Flinders around 1800, after his friend and fellow explorer George Bass.

The waters just off the point are considered a critical habitat for the endangered grey nurse shark, so fishing there is restricted.

Bass Point is also home to renowned big wave surfing spot Redsands, which breaks off a headland at the entrance to Bass Point Reserve.

== See also ==
- Bass Point Reserve
