= Bass Point Reserve =

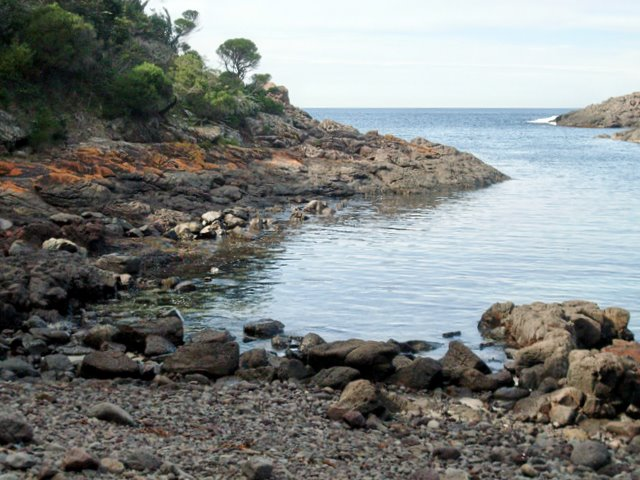
- Bushrangers Bay, Bass Point, 2008

- Location within New South Wales Location within Australia
- 34°35′45″S 150°53′45″E
- Location: Boollwarroo Parade, Shell Cove, City of Shellharbour, New South Wales, Australia

Site notes
- Owner: New South Wales Department of Climate Change, Energy, the Environment and Water; Shellharbour City Council

New South Wales Heritage Register
- Official name: Bass Point Reserve; Long Point
- Type: State heritage (landscape)
- Designated: 18 January 2013
- Reference no.: 1896
- Type: Place of significance
- Category: Aboriginal

Bass Point Reserve is a heritage-listed former cedar timber industry, Aboriginal camping, meeting place, pastoral property and basalt mine and now nature conservation and passive recreation area located at Boollwarroo Parade, Shell Cove in the Illawarra region of New South Wales, Australia. It is also known as Long Point. The property is owned by New South Wales Department of Climate Change, Energy, the Environment and Water and Shellharbour City Council. It was added to the New South Wales State Heritage Register on 18 January 2013.

== History ==
=== Indigenous history ===
Archaeological evidence indicates that Aboriginal people occupied the Illawarra region for some 20,000 years prior to the arrival of European settlers. The Elouera people are traditional custodians of the land extending from Stanwell Park in the north, Shoalhaven River in the south, west to Picton and Moss Vale, and east to the ocean. The Elouera people are a group, subdivided from the larger Dharawal group, that occupies the land from Botany Bay to Jervis Bay.

In the Illawarra region, the Elouera were identified as fresh or salt water people due to their occupation of particular marine or estuarine landscapes and their use of the natural resources found in these environments. Essentially, the Elouera people lived a hunter/gatherer lifestyle, governed by the sustainable use of their surrounding environment and the available resources. Traditionally, the division of labour in such a society was determined by gender and age – men hunted by land and sea while women gathered food and resources. The Aboriginal people had developed their understanding of the region and environmental sustainability over thousands of years and there is archaeological evidence to suggest that the people travelled the land making use of seasonal resources when they were abundantly available and allowing those depleted to regenerate with time.

The diet of the Elouera people was varied and flexible – consisting of (among other things) fish, shellfish and seals from the ocean; and wallabies, possums, birds and plants from the land. Evidence of this changing diet has been found through archaeological investigation of the shell middens at both Bass Point and along the NSW coastline.

These shell middens are found in coastal environments throughout Australia - but particularly on the east coast. Those identified at Bass Point have been dated at 6000 years old, from the period when the sea levels stabilised and the coastal environment developed into what it is today. Analysis of the content of these middens has revealed shell and food remains that indicate the hunter/gatherer lifestyle of the traditional Aboriginal people in the Illawarra region. Excavation of shell middens at Bass Point have also revealed the changing tools and technology used by the Elouera people to exploit the available resources around them - in particular, the development and evolution of hunting practices as species of fish and animals changed with the seasons and over the years.

Middens are usually found in close proximity to both fresh water supplies and have often resulted from an established occupation of a place. Evidence at Bass Point indicates the longevity of its use by the Aboriginal people as an important camping and meeting place - a value supported by the oral tradition of the local people. The coastal plain is known to have been an abundant natural environment of food and fresh water resources and, with their in-depth understanding of the marine environment, Bass Point must have been regarded by the Aboriginal people as a resourceful place that could sustain long-term occupation.

=== Early European history ===
A harmonious and balanced relationship between the Aboriginal people and the environment existed for thousands of years and it was in this form when the Aboriginal people first had contact with European explorers. Although there may have been earlier contact with Portuguese, Spanish, Polynesian or Asian explorers, the first report of Bass Point and the local Aboriginal people comes from Captain James Cook who sailed by the region on the Endeavour in April 1770. Those on board noted in their journals of their observations - "Sunday, 22nd April:....and were so near the shore as to distinguish several people upon the Sea Beach. They appeared to be of a very dark Colour....Thursday, 26th April: Saw several smokes along shore after dark, and 2 or 3 times a fire". The journals from the Endeavour also make note of the "numerous campfires, on the blackness of the natives, and of a luxuriant vegetation and varied landscape". There are historical reports that Cook attempted to make a landing along the Illawarra coastline but abandoned these efforts due to uncertain and dangerous conditions. Had this landing been successful, it would have been the first on Australian soil - predating that at Botany Bay. Although the lives of the Aboriginal people continued relatively undisturbed following this visit, stories soon circulated between the groups about sightings of the "White Swan" (believed to be a reference to the sails of the Endeavour).

The geographic nature of the Illawarra ensured that the region remained isolated from the early colonial settlement following the First Fleet landing in 1788. The surrounding mountains provided a barrier to the north and west and, with the absence of a natural and accessible harbour, official settlement of the region did not occur until early in the nineteenth century. Stories of the arrival of Europeans surely spread to the region through communication between Aboriginal groups quickly and, as in other parts of Australia, it was first thought by the Aboriginal people that the settlers were their reborn ancestors. Their pale skin but similar features ensured inquisitive but mostly civil early interactions between the settlers and the Elouera people.

=== Early Colonial exploration of the Illawarra region ===
The first official exploration of the Illawarra region (then known as the 'Five Islands District') was recorded by George Bass and Matthew Flinders in 1796. Following a similar exploratory expedition up the Georges River, Bass and Flinders ventured to the Illawarra region to explore and examine the country, take specimens from the environment and to report their findings back to the colony with recommendations for possible future settlements. The local Aboriginal people may have had sporadic interactions with other Europeans after the Bass/Flinders visit (including the shipwreck survivors of the Sydney Cove in 1797 who were making the arduous and largely fatal trek from Cape Howe to Sydney) but little changed as a result of the First Fleet landing until the region was officially settled in 1803 - the effect of this settlement on the local Aboriginal people being felt almost immediately.

The colonial settlement in Sydney experienced a severe drought in 1803 that threatened the agricultural industries (particularly cattle grazing) that supported life in the colony. Finding fresh new pastures was essential to the survival of the industry and reports of the rich untouched land further south at Lake Illawarra soon circulated amongst the colonists. Free grazing rights were issued by the government - and a significant land parcel stretching from Lake Illawarra to the Minnamurra River (and incorporating Bass Point) was granted to free settler, James Badgery, for cattle running.

At this time, Red Cedar-cutting was also an important industry in the colony and there were lucrative supplies discovered in the virgin bush of the Illawarra region.

Both the cattlemen and the cedar-cutters were adventurous and were the first Europeans to traverse the unknown country - successfully doing so by following the traditional trails established by the Aboriginal people. From even this early period of settlement, European exploitation of the land and resources had begun. The easy abuse of land through clearing of vegetation and wildlife would have been an abhorrent disrespect to the Aboriginal people. The traditional lifestyle of the people had been sustained by this land and its immediate exploitation by the European settlers would no doubt have led to future conflicts.

=== Colonial settlement and development of industry ===
In 1816, in an effort to regulate land ownership in an official system, Governor Lachlan Macquarie called for the division of the region (what is now Shellharbour Municipality) into land grants - 22 in total. The free grants were given to prominent colonial citizens and cattlemen - one such grant of 1650 acres, and later an additional 2000 acres (including Bass Point), was granted to D'Arcy Wentworth, a wealthy colonial official and medical practitioner.

Although Wentworth was promised the land grants in 1817, he was not issued with the land until 1821 when he established "Peterborough Estate". Following the exit of Badgery, Wentworth was able to run his own cattle while, at the same time, acquiring surrounding grants to expand his land holding. There is a strong presumption that the expansion of Peterborough Estate was organised with the other land-holders from very early on. The land was rich in pasture and possibility but remained largely unsettled and unused by its early owners. By 1827, Wentworth had acquired the largest land holding in the region totalling 13,050 acres - including Bass Point and the private Peterborough township (that is now Shellharbour village).

The repossession and division of the richest lands in the region had a devastating effect on the Elouera people. The prime locations selected for land grants would have been those with easy accessibility to fresh water supplies - the areas most valued by the Aboriginal people for resources and as traditional camping places. Larger numbers of people occupying the land also reduced the capacity for the Aboriginal people to traverse the region as they had traditionally done.

Colonial grazing and farming of the land also had a detrimental and lasting effect on the native food supplies used by the Aboriginal people. Traditional plants had been destroyed by grazing cattle and replaced by introduced plant species.

Additionally, native animal species had been frightened away from their habitats. In no time, the scarcity of traditional resources saw a crisis arise in the lifestyle of the local Aboriginal people - their homeland was being ravaged and their very survival was at risk.

The rapid degradation of the sustainable environment left the traditional Aboriginal people with one option: appropriate the introduced crops and stock to survive. While traditional Aboriginal life had no concept of ownership (but rather a shared use of land and resources), the settlers viewed their actions as theft and crimes punishable by violent retaliation. At this point in relations, the Aboriginal people were struggling to maintain their traditional ways of life while contending with the force of the colonial settlers and it was soon realised that the Elouera people had little to match the sheer number of settlers with their introduced firearms and diseases (smallpox, influenza and tuberculosis).

The colonial government, under Governor Macquarie's direction, had declared unofficial war against the Aboriginal people. A detachment of the 46th Regiment was sent to Red Point (now Hill 60 at Port Kembla) to bring a show of force to the Aboriginal people. "During April of 1816 Macquarie instructed his soldiers to seek out the Aborigines and "strike them with terror .... drive them to a distance from the settlements of the White Men ... inflict terrible and exemplary punishments" so as the NSW Government would not be seen to show cowardice in the face of perceived Aboriginal aggression". It was the colonial intention that fear be instilled in the local Aboriginal people to reduce retaliation attempts on the settlement.

As a result of this action, the traditional Aboriginal population was quickly decimated. With forced removal to fringe camps, assimilation to European culture and the imposition of strict control measures - coupled with their delegation to the bottom of the social hierarchy - the Aboriginal people had no recourse against the invasion of the settlers throughout the nineteenth century. Governor Macquarie's plans to expand the colonial frontier had been a success and the rich land of the Illawarra region had been cleared of its traditional inhabitants and was free to be exploited by the settlers.

By the 1840s, the colony was experiencing an economic depression and the large landholdings in the region were soon subdivided into smaller tenant farms. Provided rent-free for periods of up to six years, the land was leased to families for the purpose of clearing native vegetation and cultivating crops. Wheat and maize were popular early crops but soon proved to be susceptible to rust and ultimately financially unprofitable for the farmers. By the second half of the nineteenth century however, the dairy industry had been established and was proving to be a successful business for the small landholders in the region.

During this period, 1,040 hectares (2,560 acres) of Peterborough Estate (including Bass Point) had been sold by the Wentworth family to George Laurence Fuller who named the property "Dunmore Estate". By 1880, Fuller had negotiated a mining venture and established a basalt "blue gold" quarry to the south of Bass Point including the construction of a new 150-metre (480 ft) jetty to ship the quarried metal. Although the enterprise collapsed within two years, Fuller resumed operations as the proprietor and manager and, by 1890, business was booming. To support the industry, Fuller soon improved and extended the jetty to 150 metres (500 ft) and commissioned the construction of the SS Dunmore to transport the crushed basalt from Bass Point to the markets of Sydney.

=== Shipping trade at Bass Point ===
Shipping was the favoured mode of transport of the product but the journey was often a hazardous one with a number of ships lost along the coast and in the waters surrounding Bass Point. The Bertha, a 79-tonne (87-short-ton) wooden schooner, is thought to be one of the earliest wrecks from the basalt trade. It was reported that she was transporting bluestone from Kiama to Sydney and, on 9 September 1879, ran ashore on the north side of Bass Point and broke apart. It was reported in the media at the time that the local Aboriginal people camped at Bass Point had assisted with the rescue of the three crewmen and two passengers on board by conveying a line from the stricken vessel to the shore.

Over the years, other ships experienced a similar fate to that of the Bertha: in 1880, the wooden paddle steamer Our Own was wrecked off the beach at Bass Point with the loss of two lives; the Alexander Berry, a wooden steamer, went down in 1901 with four of the five crewmen perishing in the accident; the Comboyne wrecked in 1920; and the Kiltobranks, another blue metal carrier, in 1924.

One of the more well-known shipwrecks of Bass Point was the loss of the Cities Service Boston on 16 May 1943. The US oil tanker was transporting fuel supplies from the Middle East before running aground during a storm at what is now known as Boston Point. Australian soldiers from the 6th Australian Machine Gun Battalion were camped nearby and assisted in the rescue of the 62 crew on board. All lives from the Boston were saved but four Australian soldiers perished in the rescue. To commemorate the loss, plaques were unveiled at Bass Point in 1968 and a remembrance service is held at the site each year.

Since Dunmore Estate was sold in the 1920s, the land in and around Bass Point was used by the Australian Military Forces for defensive, training and surveillance functions. By c. 1957, Bass Point was purchased by Imperial Chemical Industries (ICI) and mining of its extensive basalt deposits was renewed. The original jetty had deteriorated beyond the needs of the mining leases and was ultimately demolished in 1958 before being replaced by a new jetty directly east of the original.

=== Conservation as a nature reserve ===
It was as a result of the increased mining of Bass Point in the 1960s, that its future as a natural reserve was first considered. Local conservationists had formed a society to promote the natural value of Bass Point and to balance the interests of both conservation and development. A reserve was officially declared in 1968 and, furthermore, Bushrangers Bay Marine Reserve was declared in 1982.

=== Archaeological discoveries ===
Since the historic value of Bass Point has been recognised, there have been archaeological investigations of the area that have revealed significant information about its pre-contact history. Of the 12 shell midden sites identified on Bass Point, Dr Sandra Bowdler investigated six sites in 1970 as the basis for her thesis. Further analysis of the remaining six sites was undertaken by Dr PJ Hughes in 1974.

Middens of the NSW South Coast, including those at Bass Point, contain indicative remains of the food sources of the Aboriginal people. Upon analysis of the middens at Bass Point, Dr Bowdler and Dr Hughes discovered shells and bones of shellfish, fish, wallabies, bandicoots, possums, birds and seals.

It was also considered that the many middens along the northern shoreline may, in fact, represent a single continuous midden site.

These archaeological excavations revealed the environmental change and evolution of Bass Point over time and, further analysis of the midden sites has shown the development of techniques used by the Aboriginal people to hunt and gather available resources. As a result of these archaeological assessments, Bass Point is now considered to be one of the most significant Aboriginal archaeological sites to be excavated in NSW.

== Description ==
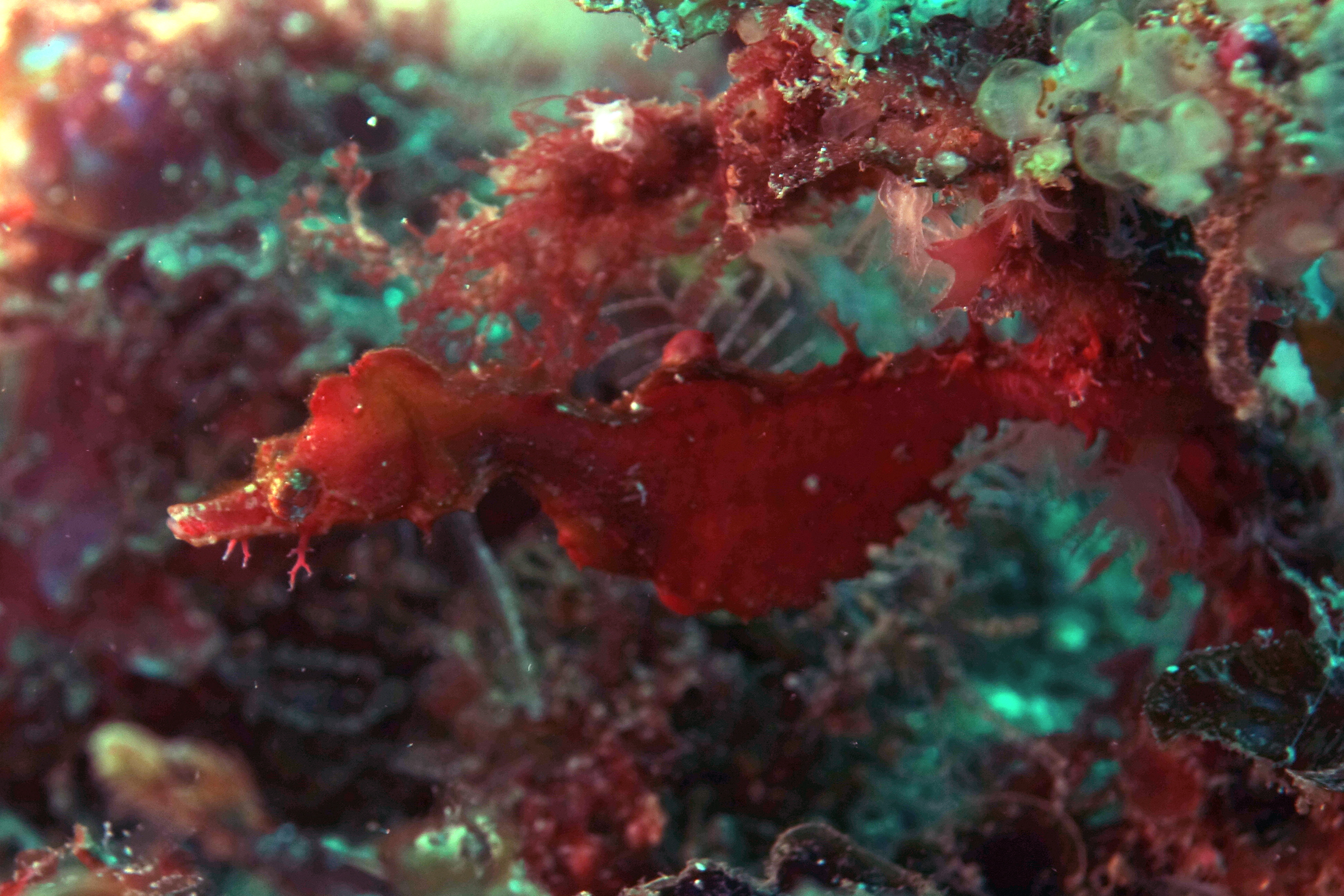
Sydney's Pygmy Pipehorse (Idiotropiscis lumnitzeri), approx 5 centimetres (2.0 in) in length at Bass Point, 2013

Located 25 kilometres (16 mi) south of Wollongong, Bass Point Reserve is a 4 km-long natural promontory of rocky shorelines and sandy embayments that supports a diverse collection of natural and cultural elements.

As a cultural landscape, Bass Point Reserve includes sites of Aboriginal archaeological significance and others of European historical significance. Fourteen sites associated with the sustained Aboriginal occupation of the land have been identified – 13 of which are coastal shell middens and one meeting and camping place. Sites of European occupation include potential remnants of the original jetty (to the west of the existing jetty) and, on Boston Point, a memorial to the 1943 shipwreck of the Cities Service Boston and the four lives lost during the rescue operation.

In the waters surrounding Bass Point Reserve, six shipwrecks have been identified and the associated artefact scatter recorded. These wrecks include Bertha (1879), Our Own (1880), Alexander Berry (1901), Comboyne (1920), Kiltobranks (1924) and the Cities Service Boston (1943).

The Bass Point Marine Area surrounding the reserve is regarded as highly significant for its biodiversity and pristine condition. This relatively undisturbed environment supports a variety of common, rare and endangered fauna and flora species. The shallow and sheltered waters have seen the development of a significant but fragile Sea Grass Habitat that provides a suitable environment for many aquatic animals to shelter, feed and breed.

Bass Point Marine Area is also classified as critical habitat for the Grey Nurse Shark – an endangered species under NSW law.

To the eastern point of Bass Point Reserve is Bushrangers Bay Aquatic Reserve. Made up of beaches, intertidal rock pools, seagrasses and submarine cliffs the reserve provides important habitats for a variety of animals including fish, anemones, sponges, crabs, molluscs and urchins.

Bass Point Reserve also supports diverse headland vegetation and significant littoral rainforest - making it one of the most important and unique natural landscapes in southern NSW. Littoral rainforest is generally a closed forest with its structure and composition strongly influenced by its close proximity to the marine environment. Positioned on coastal headlands or beach sand dunes, littoral rainforest is considered an Endangered Ecological Community in NSW. The natural vegetation of Bass Point Reserve supports a variety of flora and fauna, both common and rare to the region.

Today, Bass Point Reserve is an important location for recreational visitors, due to its combination of scenic and cultural features.

=== Condition ===
The natural environment of Bass Point Reserve has undergone periods of regeneration by Shellharbour Council's rangers and is in good condition. The ongoing maintenance of visitor areas has also ensured the good condition of facilities.

Since the Bass Point Marine Area was identified, and specific areas classified as critical habitats and aquatic reserves, the marine environment surrounding Bass Point Reserve has remained in pristine condition.

Although Bass Point Reserve has been subject to earlier archaeological investigations (in 1969/70 by Dr Sandra Bowdler and again in 1974 by Hughes & Sullivan), there is great potential for further archaeological discoveries – both terrestrial and maritime.

Through Dr Bowdler's investigation, she concluded that there is potential that the individual shell midden sites on the northern shoreline could represent one single continuous midden site. It is also highly probable that there may be unrecorded Aboriginal artefact scatters and burial sites on the reserve (either individually or in association with midden sites).

In regard to shipwrecks, the location of the Bertha remains undiscovered and it is also possible that there are further shipwrecks that have gone unrecorded in present documentation.

Bass Point Reserve is an evolving, naturally changing landscape. Its designation as a nature reserve ensures the site will remain a natural environment in the future while maintaining its use for recreational purposes.

=== Modifications and dates ===
Since pre-European contact, with archaeological evidence indicating sustained occupation of Bass Point by Aboriginal people (some 20,000 years), the following modifications have been made:

- 1803 – grazing and clearing rights secured by free settler, James Badgery, for land (including Bass Point)
- 1880 – George Laurence Fuller (proprietor and business manager) commences basalt mining on Bass Point
- 1885 – Fuller builds 150-metre (480 ft) jetty for shipping of blue metal from Bass Point quarry to Sydney
- c. 1890 – Fuller improves and extends jetty to 150 metres (500 ft)
- 1939–53 – Bass Point used by Australian Military Forces for various defensive, training and surveillance functions
- c. 1958 – demolition of jetty and construction of modern replacement (sited directly to the east)
- 1968 – construction and unveiling of memorial to Cities Service Boston shipwreck and the four lives lost during the rescue operation
- 1968 – Bass Point given to Shellharbour Council for future use as natural reserve
- Post-1968 – minor development (building and maintaining roads; parking sites; amenities; and public facilities)

== Heritage listing ==
As at 28 March 2012, Bass Point Reserve is of state heritage significance for both its Aboriginal and European values; its pre- and post-contact history; and its natural and maritime heritage.

Archaeological evidence indicates that Aboriginal people have occupied the Illawarra region and Bass Point Reserve for some 20,000 years prior to the arrival of European settlers. The traditional custodians of the land, the Elouera people lived in a hunter/gatherer lifestyle, governed by the sustainable use of the environment and the resources available. Bass Point was a place of established occupation for the Aboriginal people and is regarded as a traditionally important camping and meeting place.

Bass Point has been the focus of attention from archaeologists since the late 1960s as an area that has potential to reveal significant information about pre-contact history in NSW. Twelve midden sites and one camping/meeting place have been identified and archaeological excavations have revealed the environmental change and evolution of the area over time and the development of techniques used by the Aboriginal people to hunt and gather available resources.

Alongside Burrill Lake rock shelter (which is of similar antiquity), Bass Point is considered to be one of the most significant Aboriginal archaeological sites to be excavated in NSW. It is considered to be a rare example of established occupation and continues to be of exceptionally high significance to the Aboriginal people of NSW.

Upon the arrival of European settlers to the Illawarra region in 1803, the land of Bass Point was granted to D'Arcy Wentworth, a wealthy colonial official and the Principal Surgeon and Principal Superintendent of Police. A significant colonial figure, Wentworth developed a substantial estate (of some 5,280 hectares (13,050 acres) – including Bass Point) from 1821 to 1865 and was influential in the development of the Shellharbour area.

Bass Point also had a significant but brief association with Captain James Cook who first made note of the region and its Aboriginal occupants as the Endeavour sailed by the coastline in April 1770.

Bass Point has another brief association with the colonial explorers George Bass and Matthew Flinders who made the first recorded European visit to the region in 1796. The contemporary naming of Bass Point commemorates these early explorations.

Bass Point Reserve has significant natural features and habitats that contribute to its aesthetic value. A prominent headland in the region, Bass Point contains elements of bush, beach and ocean that create a visually spectacular environment of both land and sea.

This key coastal landscape is also regarded as highly significant for its biodiversity and pristine condition. The relatively undisturbed environment supports a variety of common, rare and endangered fauna and flora species - including littoral rainforest and habitats for the endangered grey nurse shark and sea grasses.

The maritime landscape around Bass Point Reserve also contains a number of shipwrecks and archaeological evidence, dating from 1879. The most significant and well known, the Cities Service Boston, was wrecked in May 1943 and a memorial was erected at Boston Point to commemorate the Australian lives lost in the rescue.

Bass Point Reserve was listed on the New South Wales State Heritage Register on 18 January 2013 having satisfied the following criteria.

The place is important in demonstrating the course, or pattern, of cultural or natural history in New South Wales.

Bass Point Reserve is of state heritage significance for both its Aboriginal and European values and its pre- and post-contact history.

Archaeological evidence indicates that Aboriginal people occupied Bass Point Reserve for some 20,000 years prior to the arrival of European settlers. The traditional custodians of the land, these people lived in a hunter/gatherer lifestyle, governed by the sustainable use of the environment and the resources available.

Bass Point has been the focus of attention from archaeologists since the late 1960s as an area that has potential to reveal significant information about pre-contact history in NSW. Twelve midden sites and one camping/meeting place have been identified and archaeological excavations have revealed the environmental change and evolution of the area over time and the development of techniques used by the Aboriginal people to hunt and gather available resources.

Alongside Burrill Lake rock shelter (which is of similar antiquity), Bass Point is considered to be one of the most significant Aboriginal archaeological sites to be excavated in NSW.

Official European settlement in the Illawarra region and on Bass Point Reserve, started from 1817 with the division of land and the establishment of agriculture and industry. The development of basalt mining on the point saw the growth of shipping in the region but, due to the hazardous conditions of the new transport route, a number of ships were wrecked off the Bass Point coastline – the Bertha (1879); Our Own (1880); Alexander Berry (1901); Comboyne (1920); Kiltobranks (1924); and the Cities Service Boston (1943).

The place has a strong or special association with a person, or group of persons, of importance of cultural or natural history of New South Wales's history.

Bass Point Reserve is of state heritage significance for its association with a number of significant people and groups.

Traditionally, and for some 20,000 years prior to European settlement, the land has been occupied by the Elouera people of the Dharawal group. The longevity of the use of Bass Point as a camping and meeting place indicates its significance to the Aboriginal people of this region. Documentary, archaeological and oral evidence indicate that Bass Point was, and is, considered to be an extremely important place by local Aboriginal people and that "the general "feeling" about the place was that it was a good and happy place". Although the significance of this site to the Elouera people stretches for thousands of years into the past, its importance to the contemporary Aboriginal community continues today.

Bass Point also had a significant, but brief, association with Captain James Cook and the Endeavour. As the Endeavour sailed by the Illawarra coastline in April 1770, journal notes were made about their observations of the landscape and the traditional Aboriginal occupants. There is evidence to suggest that Cook attempted a landing in the region but abandoned the effort due to dangerous conditions. Had this landing attempt succeeded, it would have been the first on Australian soil – predating that at Botany Bay.

The first recorded European visit to the region was by colonial explorers and naval men, George Bass and Matthew Flinders, in 1796. Exploring the unknown country to observe and report back to the colony, Bass and Flinders were most-likely the first contact the Elouera people had had with European settlers. The contemporary naming of Bass Point commemorates the initial explorations of these significant explorers.

After the Illawarra region had been officially settled, the land was divided into free grants, and Bass Point was granted to D'Arcy Wentworth, a wealthy colonial official and medical practitioner. Wentworth had arrived in Australia as a free settler and Assistant Surgeon on a convict fleet in 1790. By 1811, Governor Lachlan Macquarie had appointed him Principal Surgeon and Principal Superintendent of Police. Also a founding member of the Bank of NSW, Wentworth is a significant colonial figure who developed a substantial estate (of some 13,050 acres, including Bass Point) from 1821 to 1865.

The place is important in demonstrating aesthetic characteristics and/or a high degree of creative or technical achievement in New South Wales.

Bass Point Reserve features significant natural habitats and a prominent headland comprising bushland, beach, and ocean ecosystems. The site's coastal landscape holds high aesthetic value, and its visitation rates reflect ongoing public interest in its natural environment.

The place has a strong or special association with a particular community or cultural group in New South Wales for social, cultural or spiritual reasons.

The social significance of Bass Point Reserve remains strong in contemporary Aboriginal culture. There is a widespread understanding that the Elouera people (a subdivision of the larger Dharawal group) are the traditional occupants of the land of the Illawarra region. The coastal landscape at Bass Point supported the established camp sites of the Aboriginal people and provided a diverse and sustainable natural source of food and fresh water for some 20,000 years prior to European arrival to Australia. Following white settlement, the Aboriginal people continued to use the Bass Point area as a camp site and meeting place.

The designation of Bass Point Reserve has ensured that the natural value of the site is conserved and is still available for use by the Aboriginal people of the region today. The site is also widely used by visitors as a tourist and recreational resource.

The place has potential to yield information that will contribute to an understanding of the cultural or natural history of New South Wales.

Bass Point Reserve has state heritage significance for its potential to reveal further information through archaeological research. Although it has been subject to earlier archaeological investigations (in 1969/70 by Dr Sandra Bowdler and again in 1974 by Hughes & Sullivan), there is great potential for further archaeological discoveries, both terrestrial and maritime.

Through Dr Bowdler's investigation, it was concluded that there is potential that the individual shell midden sites on the northern shoreline could represent one single and continuous midden. It is also highly probable that there may be unrecorded Aboriginal artefact scatters and burial sites on the reserve (either individually or in association with midden sites).

In regard to shipwrecks, the location of the Bertha remains undiscovered and it is also possible that there are further shipwrecks that have gone unrecorded in present documentation.

The place possesses uncommon, rare or endangered aspects of the cultural or natural history of New South Wales.

Bass Point has been the focus of attention from archaeologists since the late 1960s as an area that has potential to reveal significant information about pre-contact history in NSW.

Twelve midden sites and one camping/meeting place have been identified at Bass Point and archaeological excavations have revealed the environmental change and evolution of the area over time and the development of techniques used by the Aboriginal people to hunt and gather available resources.

Alongside Burrill Lake rock shelter (which is of similar antiquity), Bass Point is considered to be one of the most significant Aboriginal archaeological sites to be excavated in NSW.

The place is important in demonstrating the principal characteristics of a class of cultural or natural places/environments in New South Wales.

Bass Point is representative of prominent headlands in the Illawarra region and contains the coastal vegetation found throughout the area. Bass Point is also representative of places that had established occupation by Aboriginal people due to the plentiful and sustained food resources occurring naturally in the environment.

== See also ==
- Protected areas of New South Wales
- Stone Fleet (New South Wales)
