= George Lawrence Fuller =

Australian farmer (1832–1917)

- Born: 1832; Ireland
- Died: 1917; Australia
- Occupation: Farmer

George Lawrence Fuller (1832–1917) was an Australian farmer, quarry owner and shopkeeper.

== Biography ==
He was born on 29 November 1832 in Dunmore, Galway, Ireland.

He lived his entire life in Shell harbour district of Kiama, New South Wales, Australia.

He married Sarah Cunningham Miller on 20 April 1859 in Kiama, New South Wales. They had thirteen children.

He was the father of Colin Dunmore Fuller and George Warburton Fuller.

He died on 2 September 1917 in Kiama, New South Wales, Australia.

== Career ==
He worked as farmer, quarry owner and shopkeeper. He was also an important community member and was held in high esteem for his contributions to community building in 19th century Australia.

He was the owner of a general store which eventually became the largest business in Kiama, New South Wales. It made him the largest business owner in Kiama, New South Wales.

== See also ==
- Colin Dunmore Fuller
- George Warburton Fuller
