= List of shipwrecks in 1949 =

The list of shipwrecks in 1949 includes ships sunk, foundered, grounded, or otherwise lost during 1949.

table of contents
1949
| Jan | Feb | Mar | Apr |
| May | Jun | Jul | Aug |
| Sep | Oct | Nov | Dec |
Unknown date

== January ==
=== 1 January ===
List of shipwrecks: 1 January 1949
| Ship | State | Description |
|---|---|---|
| Queen Mary | United Kingdom | The ocean liner ran aground off Cherbourg, France. Refloated the next day. |

=== 16 January ===
List of shipwrecks: 16 January 1949
| Ship | State | Description |
|---|---|---|
| Carlene | United States | The 12-gross register ton, 34-foot (10.4 m) fishing vessel was destroyed by fire in Skookum Chuck (55°10′N 132°10′W) in Tlevak Narrows (55°16′N 133°07′W) in Southeast Alaska. |

=== 22 January ===
List of shipwrecks: 22 January 1949
| Ship | State | Description |
|---|---|---|
| NRP Fataga | Portuguese Navy | The gunboat was wrecked. |

=== 27 January ===
List of shipwrecks: 27 January 1949
| Ship | State | Description |
|---|---|---|
| Taiping | Republic of China | The badly overloaded passenger steamer, packed with over 1,000 refugees fleeing advancing Chinese Communist forces during the Chinese Civil War, sank near the Zhoushan Archipelago after a collision with the cargo vessel Chienyuan during a voyage from Shanghai, China, to Keelung, Taiwan, killing over 1,500 passengers and crew. |

=== Unknown date ===
List of shipwrecks: Unknown date January 1949
| Ship | State | Description |
|---|---|---|
| Willard A. Pollard | United States | The 366-foot (112 m), concrete-hulled cargo ship was scuttled as a breakwater in Chesapeake Bay at Kiptopeke, Virginia sometime in January. |

== February ==
=== 3 February ===
List of shipwrecks: 3 February 1949
| Ship | State | Description |
|---|---|---|
| Yewpark | United Kingdom | The collier collided with Beminnes (United Kingdom) in the Thames Estuary at Purfleet, Essex and sank. |

=== 9 February ===
List of shipwrecks: 9 February 1949
| Ship | State | Description |
|---|---|---|
| Prenton | United Kingdom | The cargo ship ran aground off Mytiki, Greece. Declared a constructive total loss but later repaired and returned to service. |

=== 13 February ===
List of shipwrecks: 13 February 1949
| Ship | State | Description |
|---|---|---|
| Granny Suzanne | United Kingdom | The coaster collided with San Miguel Bay (Panama) in the English Channel off Dover, Kent and sank with the loss of two of her eleven crew. |

=== 22 February ===
List of shipwrecks: 22 February 1949
| Ship | State | Description |
|---|---|---|
| Bombo | Australia | The coastal freighter sank at night outside Port Kembla, Australia with the loss of twelve of her fourteen crew. |
| Flying Cloud (or North Cloud) | United States | During a voyage from Cordova, Territory of Alaska, to Seattle, Washington, the 105-foot (32.0 m) motor barge was stranded in a sleet-and-snowstorm off Grass Island (57°37′N 152°10′W) in the Copper River Flats on the south-central coast of the Territory of Alaska. All four people on board survived, including her engineer, who hiked 30 miles (48 km) through sloughs and waist-deep snow to get help. |
| William Mannell | United Kingdom | The trawler, a sold off Castle-class naval trawler, suffered a jammed rudder in a squall and struck rocks at Glengad Head. She was refloated about Noon and was taken under tow by the trawler Gava (United Kingdom) but sank three hours later 2 1/2 miles (4.0 km) east of Dunmore Head, off Portaleen, County Donegal, Ireland, in 14 fathoms (84 ft; 26 m) of water. The crew were rescued by Gava. |

=== 26 February ===
List of shipwrecks: 26 February 1949
| Ship | State | Description |
|---|---|---|
| Pintail | United Kingdom | The 110-foot (34 m), 199-ton trawler stranded 300 yards (270 m) south of Bull Point Lighthouse, Rathlin Island, County Antrim, Ireland (55°17′N 06°17′W) in a gale and heavy seas. The vessel was declared a total loss and the crew were rescued. |

== March ==
=== 1 March ===
List of shipwrecks: 1 March 1949
| Ship | State | Description |
|---|---|---|
| Katowice | Poland | The cargo ship ran aground off the Netherlands. All 26 crew rescued by a Dutch lifeboat. |

=== 4 March ===
List of shipwrecks: 4 March 1949
| Ship | State | Description |
|---|---|---|
| Guararema | Brazil | The cargo ship collided with Britannia (United Kingdom) off the Ilha des Palmas, Santos, Brazil (23°59′54″S 46°19′30″W) and sank. |

=== 5 March ===
.

=== 6 March ===
List of shipwrecks: 6 March 1949
| Ship | State | Description |
|---|---|---|
| Fiducia | Netherlands | The cargo ship ran aground at Whitby, Yorkshire and was severely damaged. |

=== 13 March ===
List of shipwrecks: 13 March 1949
| Ship | State | Description |
|---|---|---|
| Ben Bheula | United Kingdom | The trawler, a sold off Castle-class minesweeping naval trawler, sprung a leak in her engine room on 11 March in heavy weather and hailstorms off Barra. She was towed into Castlebay by the trawler Cyelse (United Kingdom). On 13 March in hail and sleet storms, heavy waves swept both vessels, still connected, onto a reef. Ben Bhuela was refloated on 14 March and beached nearby for temporary repairs and refloated again. On 16 March in heavy swells she started leaking again and was beached at Caolila, temporary repairs were made and she was refloated, taken to Fleetwood where she was repaired and returned to service. |
| Cyelse | United Kingdom | Two days after the 120-foot (37 m), 237-ton trawler towed Ben Bheula (United Kingdom) into Castlebay both ships, in hail and sleet storms, heavy waves swept both, still connected, onto a reef. She was declared a total loss. |

=== 25 March ===
List of shipwrecks: 25 March 1949
| Ship | State | Description |
|---|---|---|
| Tchoung King | People's Liberation Army Navy | Chinese Civil War: The Arethusa-class light cruiser was bombed and sunk by Nationalist Chinese aircraft. The ship was salvaged, stripped of parts and used as an accommodation ship. |
| Miss Orient | Hong Kong | The passenger ship struck a mine at Canton, China and sank with the loss of up to 100 lives. |

=== 28 March ===
List of shipwrecks: 28 March 1949
| Ship | State | Description |
|---|---|---|
| A S P No. 5 | United States | The 40-gross register ton, 59.8-foot (18.2 m) scow sank in the Gulf of Alaska 75 nautical miles (139 km; 86 mi) east of Cape Saint Elias on Kayak Island off the south-central coast of the Territory of Alaska. |

=== 30 March ===
List of shipwrecks: 30 March 1949
| Ship | State | Description |
|---|---|---|
| Dan | United States | The former YMS-1-class minesweeper ran aground in Queen Charlotte Sound, British Columbia, Canada and was declared a total loss. |

=== 31 March ===
List of shipwrecks: 31 March 1949
| Ship | State | Description |
|---|---|---|
| Charles M | United Kingdom | The coaster was in collision with another vessel off Dungeness, Kent. All seven crew rescued by Sir Leonard Pearce (United Kingdom) Charles M later sank. |

=== Unknown March ===
List of shipwrecks: Unknown March 1949
| Ship | State | Description |
|---|---|---|
| "L. A. Madsen" | United Kingdom | The 70.7-foot (21.5 m) trawler departed Grimsby for the Icelandic fishing grounds on 9 March. Last radio contact was 12 March off the Faroe Islands. Lost with all 4 hands, unknown date. |

== April ==
=== 3 April ===
List of shipwrecks: 3 April 1949
| Ship | State | Description |
|---|---|---|
| Christina Dawn | United Kingdom | The coaster ran aground at Irvine, Renfrewshire. |

=== 10 April ===
List of shipwrecks: 10 April 1949
| Ship | State | Description |
|---|---|---|
| Tung An | Republic of China Navy | The cargo ship was wrecked in the Yangtze River 6 nautical miles (11 km) south west of Shaweishan. |

=== 14 April ===
List of shipwrecks: 14 April 1949
| Ship | State | Description |
|---|---|---|
| City of Waterford | Ireland | The cargo ship collided with Marpessa (Greece) in the English Channel and sank east of the Owers Lightship. All 29 crew rescued by Keynes (United Kingdom). |

=== 16 April ===
List of shipwrecks: 16 April 1949
| Ship | State | Description |
|---|---|---|
| Christina Dawn | United Kingdom | The coaster sank when her cargo of carbide exploded at Irvine, Renfrewshire. |

=== 20 April ===
List of shipwrecks: 20 April 1949
| Ship | State | Description |
|---|---|---|
| HMS Amethyst | Royal Navy | Chinese Civil War: The Black Swan-class sloop ran aground on in the Yangtze River at Rose Island, 15 nautical miles (28 km) east of Chianking after she was shelled and damaged by the People's Liberation Army with the loss of 22 crew killed and 31 wounded. HMS Consort (Royal Navy) came to her assistance and was also attacked with the loss of 10 crew killed and three injured. On 26 April, HMS London and HMS Black Swan (both Royal Navy) refloated Amethyst. They also came under fire, with three crew killed and 14 wounded. Amethyst made a dash for freedom down the Yangtze on 30 July, reaching Hong Kong on 11 August. |

=== 21 April ===
List of shipwrecks: 21 April 1949
| Ship | State | Description |
|---|---|---|
| James Clunies | United Kingdom | The cargo ship was driven ashore 1 1/2 nautical miles (2.8 km) from Punta Mogotes, Argentina and was abandoned by her crew. She was on a voyage from Bahia Blanca, Brazil to Itay. She was a total loss. |
| ROCS Pao-50 | Republic of China Navy | Chinese Civil War: The gunboat was shelled and sunk by Communist Chinese artillery between Jiangyin and Shanghai. |

=== 22 April ===
List of shipwrecks: 22 April 1949
| Ship | State | Description |
|---|---|---|
| James Clunie | United Kingdom | The cargo ship ran aground at Mar del Plata, Argentina. |

=== 23 April ===
List of shipwrecks: 23 April 1949
| Ship | State | Description |
|---|---|---|
| ROCS Hsing An | Republic of China Navy | Chinese Civil War: Yangtze fleet Uprising/breakout: The repair ship ran aground and burned under fire from Communist Chinese artillery and warships. She was salvaged by the People's Republic of China, repaired, and placed in service as Taku Shan (People's Liberation Army Navy). |
| ROCS Wei Hai | Republic of China Navy | Chinese Civil War: Yangtze fleet Uprising/breakout:The escort ran aground in heavy fog and was captured by Communist Chinese. She was salvaged by the People's Republic of China, repaired, and placed in service. |
| ROCS Yung Sui | Republic of China Navy | Chinese Civil War: Yangtze fleet Uprising/breakout: The river gunboat was shelled and sunk by Communist Chinese artillery. She was salvaged by the People's Republic of China, repaired, and placed in service |

=== 25 April ===
List of shipwrecks: 25 April 1949
| Ship | State | Description |
|---|---|---|
| Magdalena | United Kingdom | The cargo liner ran aground near Rio de Janeiro, Brazil on her maiden voyage. Declared a total loss after breaking in two during attempt to tow her into harbour. |
| Yung Chi | Republic of China Navy | Chinese Civil War: The Yung Chien-class gunboat was sunk in the Yangtze by Chinese Communist artillery fire. Raised, repaired and put in People's Liberation Army Navy service. |

=== 26 April ===
List of shipwrecks: 26 April 1949
| Ship | State | Description |
|---|---|---|
| Martha A | United States | The 128-gross register ton, 107.7-foot (32.8 m) fishing vessel was wrecked near Mary Island in the Territory of Alaska. |

=== 28 April ===
List of shipwrecks: 28 April 1949
| Ship | State | Description |
|---|---|---|
| Hui An | People's Liberation Army Navy | Chinese Civil War: The river gunboat was sunk, probably by Communist Chinese artillery. Raised, repaired, returned to service. |
| Shian | People's Liberation Army Navy | Chinese Civil War: The Yingkou-class escort ship was sunk near Yanziji by Nationalist aircraft. Raised and scrapped. |

=== Unknown date ===
List of shipwrecks: Unknown date 1949
| Ship | State | Description |
|---|---|---|
| ROCS Ying Hao | Republic of China Navy | Chinese Civil War: The gunboat was scuttled in the Yangtze. |
| ROCS Yung Chi | Republic of China Navy | Chinese Civil War: The gunboat was sunk by Chinese Communist forces in the Yangtze. The People's Republic of China refloated and repaired her and placed her in service with the People's Liberation Army Navy as Yan′an. |

== May ==
=== 1 May ===
List of shipwrecks: 1 May 1949
| Ship | State | Description |
|---|---|---|
| Tai Yuan | People's Liberation Army Navy | Chinese Civil War: The river gunboat was sunk in the Caishiji River by Nationalist aircraft. |

=== 4 May ===
List of shipwrecks: 4 May 1949
| Ship | State | Description |
|---|---|---|
| Gerhard | West Germany | The 184.7-foot (56.3 m), 777-ton cargo vessel was sunk in a collision with Carbonia. |
| Mudo | Netherlands | The coaster collided with Algol (United Kingdom) in the North Sea off Lowestoft, Suffolk and sank with the loss of two of her six crew. |

=== 8 May ===
List of shipwrecks: 8 May 1949
| Ship | State | Description |
|---|---|---|
| Olga N | United States | The 11-gross register ton motor vessel sank in the Gulf of Alaska. |

=== 15 May ===
List of shipwrecks: 15 May 1949
| Ship | State | Description |
|---|---|---|
| Ebba | Denmark | The schooner sank 200 nautical miles (370 km) off Cape Farewell, Greenland. The five crew took to a lifeboat. |

=== 24 May ===
List of shipwrecks: 24 May 1949
| Ship | State | Description |
|---|---|---|
| Yung Huai | China | Chinese Civil War: The T1 tanker was scuttled in the Whangpoo River. |
| Yung Loo | China | Chinese Civil War: The T1 tanker was scuttled in the Whangpoo River. |
| Yung Tao | China | Chinese Civil War: The T1 tanker was scuttled in the Whangpoo River. |

=== 25 May ===
List of shipwrecks: 25 May 1949
| Ship | State | Description |
|---|---|---|
| Henrik | Norway | The cargo ship struck a mine and sank in the Sound of Falsterbo, Denmark with the loss of four of her nineteen crew. |
| Reliable | United States | The 104-foot (31.7 m) fishing trawler sank in the North Atlantic Ocean off New Jersey east-southeast of Barnegat Inlet. |

=== 28 May ===
List of shipwrecks: 28 May 1949
| Ship | State | Description |
|---|---|---|
| Glycine | French Navy | First Indochina War: The D 210-class minesweeper was sunk by a mine in the Mekong River, Vietnam, French Indochina. 32 crewmen killed, one survivor. |

=== 29 May ===
List of shipwrecks: 29 May 1949
| Ship | State | Description |
|---|---|---|
| Inchmark | Hong Kong | The cargo ship ran aground on the Schilpad Island Reef, Banda Sea (7°05′S 132°03′E) and was declared a total loss. |

=== Unknown date ===
List of shipwrecks: Unknown date 1949
| Ship | State | Description |
|---|---|---|
| ROCS Mei Yuan | Republic of China Navy | Chinese Civil War: The Wake-class river gunboat was scuttled at Shanghai, China, to prevent capture by Chinese Communist forces. |

== June ==
=== 3 June ===
List of shipwrecks: 3 June 1949
| Ship | State | Description |
|---|---|---|
| Norjerv | United Kingdom | The Design 1080 ship broke in two whilst under tow of the tugs Rifleman and Tradesman (both United Kingdom) whilst being towed from Normandy, France to Strangford Lough, Northern Ireland for scrapping. Both halves sank. |

=== 5 June ===
List of shipwrecks: 5 June 1949
| Ship | State | Description |
|---|---|---|
| Sophie | United States | The 8-gross register ton, 29.4-foot (9.0 m) fishing vessel sank 1,000 yards (910 m) west of Point Amelia (57°13′30″N 135°52′30″W) in Southeast Alaska. |

=== 6 June ===
List of shipwrecks: 6 June 1949
| Ship | State | Description |
|---|---|---|
| Chilkoot | United States | The 41-gross register ton, 60.6-foot (18.5 m) tug and fishing vessel was destroyed y fire off "Rocky Point" – probably a reference to Rocky Bay (60°21′30″N 147°03′00″W) – on Montague Island on the south-central coast of the Territory of Alaska. Her crew of four was rescued by the tug New Sunrise (United States). |

=== 10 June ===
List of shipwrecks: 10 June 1949
| Ship | State | Description |
|---|---|---|
| Sunset | United States | The 40-gross register ton, 58.9-foot (18.0 m) seiner capsized and sank at False Pass, Territory of Alaska, with the loss of five lives. The fishing vessel Johnny B (United States) rescued her four survivors. |

=== 20 June ===
List of shipwrecks: 20 June 1949
| Ship | State | Description |
|---|---|---|
| Empire Conyngham | United Kingdom | The vessel was scuttled in the Bay of Biscay (47°52′N 8°52′W) with a cargo of obsolete bombs. |
| Myosotis | French Navy | First Indochina War: The D 210-class minesweeper was sunk by a mine in the Mekong River, Vietnam, French Indochina. 29 crewmen killed. |

=== 21 June ===
List of shipwrecks: 21 June 1949
| Ship | State | Description |
|---|---|---|
| Prinses Astrid | Belgium | The cross-Channel ferry struck a mine 3 nautical miles (5.6 km) off Dunkirk, France and sank with the loss of five of her 65 crew. All 60 surviving crew members and all 218 passengers on board were rescued by Cap Hatid (France) and various tugs from Dunkirk. |

=== 22 June ===
List of shipwrecks: 22 June 1949
| Ship | State | Description |
|---|---|---|
| Corcrest | United Kingdom | The cargo ship struck the wreck of the Victory ship Fort Massac (United Kingdom) off Clacton-on-Sea, Essex and ran aground in a sinking state. |

== July ==
=== 1 July ===
List of shipwrecks: 1 July 1949
| Ship | State | Description |
|---|---|---|
| Marie-Flore | Belgium | The vessel collided with Ragnhild Brövig (Norway) off the mouth of the River Scheldt (51°24′45″N 3°23′30″E) and sank. The wreck was raised in 1950, repaired and sold to Dutch buyers. |

=== 2 July ===
List of shipwrecks: 2 July 1949
| Ship | State | Description |
|---|---|---|
| Equator | United States | The wooden 92.9-foot (28.3 m) 238-gross register ton commercial fishing boat was returning from Central America to the United States carrying a fresh catch of frozen fish when she struck a rock 150 yards (137 m) off Anacapa Island in the northern Channel Islands off Port Hueneme, California, early in the morning and sank quickly in 30 feet (9 m) of water. |

=== 3 July ===
List of shipwrecks: 3 July 1949
| Ship | State | Description |
|---|---|---|
| Cheng Huo | Republic of China | Chinese Civil War: The merchant vessel was sunk by People's Liberation Army artillery in the Yangtze River. |

=== 11 July ===
List of shipwrecks: 11 July 1949
| Ship | State | Description |
|---|---|---|
| Ioannis G. Kulukundis | Greece | The Liberty ship ran aground at Point Arguello, California, United States and broke in two. She was declared a constructive total loss. |

=== 14 July ===
List of shipwrecks: 14 July 1949
| Ship | State | Description |
|---|---|---|
| Tung Nan | China | Chinese Civil War: The merchant vessel was sunk at Wenchow by Nationalist aircraft. |

=== 29 July ===
List of shipwrecks: 29 July 1949
| Ship | State | Description |
|---|---|---|
| Valo | United States | The 10-gross register ton 33.9-foot (10.3 m) gasoline-powered fishing vessel was destroyed by fire off Hoonah, Territory of Alaska. |

=== 30 July ===
List of shipwrecks: 30 July 1949
| Ship | State | Description |
|---|---|---|
| Kiang Ling | Republic of China | Chinese Civil War: The ferry was shelled and sunk in the Yangtze by Red Chinese artillery that was targeting HMS Amethyst (Royal Navy) as it escaped down river. |

=== 31 July ===
List of shipwrecks: 31 July 1949
| Ship | State | Description |
|---|---|---|
| Swan Point | United Kingdom | The cargo ship ran aground in the Karnaphuli River, Chittagong, India and broke in two. She was on a voyage from Karachi to Chittagong. She was declared a total loss. |

=== Unknown date ===
List of shipwrecks: unknown July 1949
| Ship | State | Description |
|---|---|---|
| Ha Sin | China | Chinese Civil War: The merchant vessel was sunk at Shanghai by Nationalist aircraft sometime in July. Raised and scrapped. |

== August ==
=== 8 August ===
List of shipwrecks: 8 August 1949
| Ship | State | Description |
|---|---|---|
| HMNZS Philomel | Royal New Zealand Navy | After being sold out of naval service, deliberately run aground, stripped, and refloated, the decommissioned Pearl-class cruiser was scuttled off Cuvier Island, New Zealand. |

=== 11 August ===
List of shipwrecks: 11 August 1949
| Ship | State | Description |
|---|---|---|
| A S P No. 4 | United States | The 40-gross register ton, 60-foot (18.3 m) scow sank off Ninilchik, Territory of Alaska. |

=== 14 August ===
List of shipwrecks: 14 August 1949
| Ship | State | Description |
|---|---|---|
| Three Deuces | United States | The 14-gross register ton, 45.1-foot (13.7 m) fishing vessel was destroyed by fire 100 yards off the coast of Admiralty Island in the Alexander Archipelago in Southeast Alaska and about 0.25-mile (0.4 km) south of the point where Bear Creek empties into Stephens Passage. |

=== 17 August ===
List of shipwrecks: 17 August 1949
| Ship | State | Description |
|---|---|---|
| Frolic | United States | The 9-gross register ton, 36.2-foot (11.0 m) fishing vessel sank Salisbury Sound near Kane Island (57°19′25″N 135°40′00″W) in the Alexander Archipelago in Southeast Alaska. |
| Tung Shan | China | Chinese Civil War:The merchant vessel was sunk between Shanghai and Pukow by Nationalist aircraft. Eventually raised and repaired. |

=== 23 August ===
List of shipwrecks: 23 August 1949
| Ship | State | Description |
|---|---|---|
| Chungli | China | Chinese Civil War: The cargo ship loaded with ammunition exploded and sank at Kaohsiung, Formosa with the loss of over 500 lives. Two other ships were sunk and many fires started in Kaohsiung. |
| Maine | United States | The 29-gross register ton, 45.4-foot (13.8 m) fishing vessel sank in Lisianski Strait (57°50′N 136°27′W) in Southeast Alaska. |
| St Clair | United Kingdom | The 128.3-foot (39.1 m), 255-ton trawler went aground on the Isle of Stroma in Penland Firth. She refloated, was blown across the Firth and stranded on rocks on the Island of Swona, a total loss. Scrapped in place. |

=== 26 August ===
List of shipwrecks: 26 August 1949
| Ship | State | Description |
|---|---|---|
| Boomer | United States | The 8-gross register ton, 30.6-foot (9.3 m) or 35-foot (10.7 m) fishing vessel was destroyed by fire near Cape Georgiana (57°19′45″N 135°51′30″W) in Southeast Alaska. |
| USS Cochino | United States Navy | The Balao-class submarine sank in an arctic gale caused battery explosions in the Barents Sea off Norway at 71°35′N 023°35′E. All crew were rescued, except for a civilian technician on board who was lost, by USS Tusk (United States Navy) with the loss of six of Tusk's crew members. |
| Gambier | United States | The 31-gross register ton, 47-foot (14.3 m) motor cargo vessel was destroyed by fire 1 nautical mile (1.9 km; 1.2 mi) west of Cape Bingham (58°05′30″N 136°31′00″W) in Cross Sound in the Alexander Archipelago in Southeast Alaska. |

=== 31 August ===
List of shipwrecks: 31 August 1949
| Ship | State | Description |
|---|---|---|
| El Paso | United States | The 33-gross register ton, 58.8-foot (17.9 m) fishing vessel was destroyed by fire off Silvester Point (55°25′15″N 133°24′40″W) in Southeast Alaska. |

== September ==
=== 5 September ===
List of shipwrecks: 5 September 1949
| Ship | State | Description |
|---|---|---|
| Kiang Hsin | China | Chinese Civil War: The merchant vessel was sunk at Shanghai by Nationalist aircraft. |

=== 7 September ===
List of shipwrecks: 7 September 1949
| Ship | State | Description |
|---|---|---|
| Benjamin Peixotto | United States | The Liberty ship was driven ashore at Hong Kong in a typhoon. She was subsequently scrapped. |
| Chaksang | United Kingdom | The cargo ship caught fire at Hong Kong due to barratry. She sank the next day and was declared a total loss. Raised on 22 March 1950 and subsequently scrapped. |
| Edgar Allan Poe | United States | The Liberty ship was driven ashore at Hong Kong in a typhoon. Still ashore in October 1950, but was scrapped at Hong Kong in December 1950. |
| Henry L. Abbott | United States | The Liberty ship was driven ashore at Hong Kong in a typhoon. Declared a constructive total loss, she was subsequently scrapped. |

=== 9 September ===
List of shipwrecks: 9 September 1949
| Ship | State | Description |
|---|---|---|
| Pacific Enterprise | United Kingdom | The cargo liner ran aground 4 nautical miles (7.4 km) north of Point Arena, California, United States. |

=== 14 September ===
List of shipwrecks: 14 September 1949
| Ship | State | Description |
|---|---|---|
| Noronic | Canada | Noronic The ship caught fire and sank whilst moored in Toronto Harbour with the loss of at least 118 lives. The vessel was raised in November 1949 and subsequently scrapped. |

=== 15 September ===
List of shipwrecks: 15 September 1949
| Ship | State | Description |
|---|---|---|
| Afognak | United States | The 95-gross register ton, 76.1-foot (23.2 m) motor cargo vessel sank at Palm Point (60°11′N 144°33′W) in Controller Bay (60.0770°N 144.2178°W) on the south-central coast of the Territory of Alaska. |

=== 19 September ===
List of shipwrecks: 19 September 1949
| Ship | State | Description |
|---|---|---|
| Chatham | United States | The seiner grounded on a rock and rolled over in Slocum Arm (57°34′N 136°03′W) in Southeast Alaska. Her crew abandoned ship in a lifeboat and was rescued by a cannery tender. |
| US FWS Scoter | United States Fish and Wildlife Service | The vessel was wrecked on rocks in Slocum Arm (58°57′N 152°15′W) in Southeast Alaska. She was later salvaged and sold into private ownership. |
| USS U-1105 | United States Navy | The Type VIIC/41 submarine was sunk in the Atlantic Ocean off Piney Point, Maryland (38°08′10″N 76°33′10″W) in a test of a depth charge. |

=== 20 September ===
List of shipwrecks: 20 September 1949
| Ship | State | Description |
|---|---|---|
| Shannon Belle | United States | The troller was wrecked at the entrance to Lituya Bay on the south-central coast of the Territory of Alaska. |

=== 22 September ===
List of shipwrecks: 22 September 1949
| Ship | State | Description |
|---|---|---|
| ARA Fournier | Argentine Navy | The Bouchard-class minesweeper was wrecked on an uncharted rock in the Strait of Magellan. |

=== 23 September ===
List of shipwrecks: 23 September 1949
| Ship | State | Description |
|---|---|---|
| An Tung | People's Liberation Army Navy | Chinese Civil War: The An Tung-class gunboat was sunk by Nationalist planes at Wuhu, China. |
| Surreybrook | United Kingdom | Wrecked on Spanish Battery Point, Tynemouth. |
| Yung Sui | People's Liberation Army Navy | Chinese Civil War: The river gunboat was sunk by Nationalist North American B-25 Mitchell bomber aircraft near Yangjiagou, China. |

=== 28 September ===
List of shipwrecks: 28 September 1949
| Ship | State | Description |
|---|---|---|
| Roslin Caste | United Kingdom | The ocean liner ran aground in the River Humber. Later refloated and resumed her voyage. |

=== Unknown date ===
List of shipwrecks: Unknown date 1949
| Ship | State | Description |
|---|---|---|
| Eagle March | United States | The 13-gross register ton, 32-foot (9.8 m) fishing vessel was lost near Kake, Territory of Alaska. |
| Major Richard M. Strong | United States | The United States Army Transport ran aground at Camp Point on Vancouver Island, British Columbia, Canada. She was salvaged, sold, repaired, and placed in commercial service as Island Sovereign. |

== October ==
=== 4 October ===
List of shipwrecks: 4 October 1949
| Ship | State | Description |
|---|---|---|
| ARA Fournier | Argentine Navy | The minesweeper sank in the Strait of Magellan while en route from Rio Gallegos to Ushuaia, all hands lost. Worst peacetime maritime disaster in Argentina as of 2018 (77 dead and missing). |
| Mira | Sweden | The cargo ship struck the wreck of the ocean liner Gneisenau (Germany) with the loss of two crew. |

=== 6 October ===
List of shipwrecks: 6 October 1949
| Ship | State | Description |
|---|---|---|
| Fantree | United Kingdom | The 6,300-ton Elder Dempster Line cargo ship struck the Flemish Ledges on the Seven Stones Reef en route from West Africa to Liverpool via Amsterdam and carrying a cargo of hardwood, palm kernels, palm oil, cocoa, rubber, cotton, coffee beans and copal The hardwood was still being salvaged in 1992. Her crew of fifty-eight was rescued by launches Kittern and Goldern Spray of the Isles of Scilly. |

=== 7 October ===
List of shipwrecks: 7 October 1949
| Ship | State | Description |
|---|---|---|
| USS Chehalis | United States Navy | The Patapsco-class gasoline tanker exploded and sank at United States Naval Station Tutuila, American Samoa with the loss of six of her 75 crew. |

=== 10 October ===
List of shipwrecks: 10 October 1949
| Ship | State | Description |
|---|---|---|
| Triton | Denmark | The fishing boat ran aground off Spurn Point, Yorkshire, United Kingdom and sank. Two of her four crew were reported missing. |

=== 16 October ===
List of shipwrecks: 16 October 1949
| Ship | State | Description |
|---|---|---|
| Ingertre | Norway | The cargo ship was wrecked off Spitsbergen. |

=== 18 October ===
List of shipwrecks: 18 October 1949
| Ship | State | Description |
|---|---|---|
| Maystone | United Kingdom | The collier was in collision with HMS Albion (Royal Navy) and sank 4 nautical miles (7.4 km) off the Longstone Lighthouse. Maystone was on a voyage from Methil, Fife to London. |

=== 19 October ===
List of shipwrecks: 19 October 1949
| Ship | State | Description |
|---|---|---|
| Liberté | France | The ocean liner was severely damaged by fire at Saint Nazaire. |

=== 20 October ===
List of shipwrecks: 20 October 1949
| Ship | State | Description |
|---|---|---|
| Africa Occidental | Portugal | The cargo ship ran aground on the Goodwin Sands, Kent, United Kingdom but was refloated undamaged after an hour. |

=== 21 October ===
List of shipwrecks: 21 October 1949
| Ship | State | Description |
|---|---|---|
| Cydonia | Ireland | The cargo ship struck a mine and sank in the Irish Sea. |

=== 25 October ===
List of shipwrecks: 25 October 1949
| Ship | State | Description |
|---|---|---|
| Unknown | People's Liberation Army Navy | Chinese Civil War: Battle of Guningtou: A Red Chinese invasion fleet of 200 vessels, mostly junks, were stranded on Kinmen Island and were destroyed by Nationalist troops with hand grenades, flame throwers and burning oil. Some were sunk with 20 mm and 40 mm gunfire from ROCS Chung Lung (Republic of China Navy). |

=== 31 October ===
List of shipwrecks: 31 October 1949
| Ship | State | Description |
|---|---|---|
| Carl Rehder | West Germany | The cargo ship collided with Rane (Sweden) in the Kiel Canal and sank. |

== November ==
=== 2 November ===
List of shipwrecks: 2 November 1949
| Ship | State | Description |
|---|---|---|
| Regulus | Philippines | The cargo ship sank in a typhoon near San Jose, Antique. |

=== 9 November ===
List of shipwrecks: 9 November 1949
| Ship | State | Description |
|---|---|---|
| HMS Ajax | Royal Navy | The decommissioned Leander-class light cruiser ran aground at Newport, Monmouthshire, England, while under tow to a scrapyard. |

=== 13 November ===
List of shipwrecks: 13 November 1949
| Ship | State | Description |
|---|---|---|
| Monte Gurugu | Spain | The cargo ship foundered in the Bristol Channel off Lundy Island with the loss of twelve of her 37 crew. Survivors were rescued by Richard Silver Oliver, Violet Armstrong and William Cantrell Ashley (all Royal National Lifeboat Institution). |

=== 18 November ===
List of shipwrecks: 18 November 1949
| Ship | State | Description |
|---|---|---|
| Astland | United Kingdom | The dredger collided with tanker Esso Juniata (United Kingdom) off Fleetwood, Lancashire and ran aground. |
| Lunevale | United Kingdom | The foot ferry ran aground off Fleetwood. |

=== 19 November ===
List of shipwrecks: 19 November 1949
| Ship | State | Description |
|---|---|---|
| Hanna | United Kingdom | The British motor-schooner, built in 1915, on voyage from Plymouth to Jersey with a cargo of lime, was wrecked off L'Etacq, Jersey, Channel Islands. Hanna was lost. |

=== 22 November ===
List of shipwrecks: 22 November 1949
| Ship | State | Description |
|---|---|---|
| Evelyn Rose | United Kingdom | The sold off Mersey-class naval trawler stranded in the Sound of Islay in darkness, heavy seas and rain. crew taken off the next day by Port Askaig lifeboat. She was refloated on 1 December and taken to Port Askaig and then to Fleetwood for repairs. Repairs finished February, 1950 and returned to service. |
| Harcourt Kent | Canada | The cargo ship was wrecked in a storm 2.5 nautical miles (4.6 km) west off St. Shott's, Newfoundland and Labrador. All eighteen of her crew were saved. |

=== 27 November ===
List of shipwrecks: 27 November 1949
| Ship | State | Description |
|---|---|---|
| Britkon | United Kingdom | The cargo ship ran aground at Oskarshamn, Sweden and was wrecked. All 27 people on board were rescued. |
| Salmora | United States | The 63-foot (19 m) fishing vessel was reported lost along with her two-man crew after disappearing during a voyage from Kodiak, Territory of Alaska, to Seattle, Washington. She reportedly had been seen at Cordova, Alaska, on 5 October. |

== December ==
=== 2 December ===
List of shipwrecks: 2 December 1949
| Ship | State | Description |
|---|---|---|
| HMS Implacable | Royal Navy | The third rate Téméraire-class ship of the line was scuttled off the Isle of Wight. |

=== 11 December ===
List of shipwrecks: 11 December 1949
| Ship | State | Description |
|---|---|---|
| Toornvliet | Netherlands | The coaster foundered off the East Goodwin Lightship with the loss of six of her nine crew. |

=== 13 December ===
List of shipwrecks: 13 December 1949
| Ship | State | Description |
|---|---|---|
| G G K | United States | The 8-gross register ton, 33-foot (10.1 m) fishing vessel was lost after she collided with an unidentified object between Necker Island and Biorka Island in Southeast Alaska. |

=== 19 December ===
List of shipwrecks: 19 December 1949
| Ship | State | Description |
|---|---|---|
| Florence Cooke | United Kingdom | The cargo ship ran aground in the Belfast Lough, County Antrim. |
| Nova | Norway | The cargo ship was wrecked two nautical miles north of Obrestad, Norway. |
| Star of El Nil | United Kingdom | The cargo ship ran aground in Holy Loch, Buteshire. |

=== 23 December ===
List of shipwrecks: 23 December 1949
| Ship | State | Description |
|---|---|---|
| HNLMS RS-21 | Royal Netherlands Navy | The tug sank in a storm off Borkum, Netherlands. |

=== 29 December ===
List of shipwrecks: 29 December 1949
| Ship | State | Description |
|---|---|---|
| Utklippan II | Sweden | The cargo ship collided with a wreck and sank in the Baltic Sea at 54°31.21′N 10°31.55′E. |

== Unknown date ==
List of shipwrecks: Unknown date 1949
| Ship | State | Description |
|---|---|---|
| Alice L. Pendleton | United States | The 228-foot (69 m), 1,349-gross register ton four-masted lumber schooner was abandoned at the Palmer Shipyard on the west side of the Mystic River in Noank, Connecticut, sometime during the 1940s, gradually rotted away, and settled on the river bottom in 10 feet (3.0 m) of water. |
| Altalena | Israel | The converted tank landing ship was scuttled in the Mediterranean Sea 15 nautical miles (28 km) off the coast of Israel. |
| B-1 | Spanish Navy | The decommissioned B-class submarine was sunk as a target by Spanish Navy destroyers in 50 metres (164 ft) of water in Alcúdia Bay on the northeastern coast of Mallorca in the Balearic Islands. |
| Empire Flamingo | United Kingdom | The bow section of the Design 1022 ship was scuttled off Gwennap Head, Cornwall. |
| ROKS Kaya San | Republic of Korea Navy | The YMS-1-class coastal minesweeper was lost. |
| Malaspina | Canada | The ship, part of the Powell River Breakwater, sank sometime in 1949 and was raised and scrapped in 1951. |
| Swivel | United States | World War II: The tanker was damaged and abandoned. |
| ROCS Wei Ning or ROCS Wen Hsing | Republic of China Navy | Chinese Civil War: The river gunboat was sunk, probably by Communist Chinese artillery. She was salvaged by the People's Republic of China, repaired, and placed in service in the People's Liberation Army Navy. |
| ROCS Yun Hsing | Republic of China Navy | Chinese Civil War: The river gunboat was sunk, probably by Communist Chinese artillery. |
| Unidentified motor launches | Egyptian Navy | Two Fairmile B motor launches sank c. 1949–1950. |
