= SS Bombo =

Coordinates: 34°26′43″S 150°55′25″E

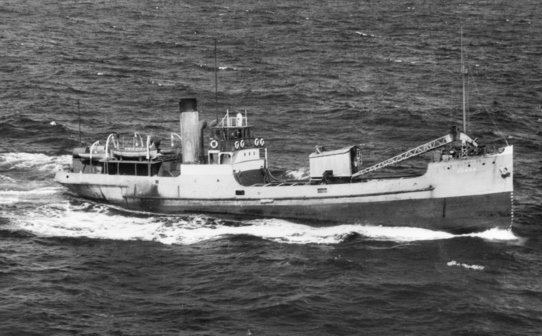
- Coastal steamer SS Bombo in 1939

History
- Name: Bombo
- Owner: State Metal Quarries, NSW
- Builder: H. Robb, Leith
- Launched: 18 December 1929
- Fate: Capsized and sank off Port Kembla, NSW, 22 Feb 1949
- Notes: Sold to Quarries Pty Ltd, Feb 1935

General characteristics
- Type: Steel-hulled coastal freighter
- Tonnage: 540 GRT
- Length: 154 feet (47 m)
- Beam: 30 feet (9.1 m)
- Draught: 12 feet (3.7 m)
- Installed power: Steam
- Crew: 14

The SS Bombo was a coastal freighter which foundered on the South Coast of New South Wales, Australia in February 1949 with the loss of twelve of her fourteen crew. Built in Scotland in 1929, the SS Bombo was sailed to Australia to carry blue metal (basalt aggregate) from the town of Kiama to the port of Sydney. During World War II she was requisitioned by the Royal Australian Navy and served as a minesweeper and a stores carrier in the Pacific Theatre to the north of Australia.

She capsized during a heavy southerly gale off Port Kembla while steaming from Kiama with a load of blue metal, and her wreck, close to the main harbour entrance, is a popular dive location. A memorial to the vessel and her lost crew stands on Black Beach, Kiama, overlooking the harbour where she made her final departure on 24 February 1949.

== History ==
=== Service in New South Wales waters ===
The S.S. Bombo was commissioned in the late 1920s by State Metal Quarries of NSW to replace its ageing vessel the S.S. Kiama. Constructed on the River Forth at Leith, Scotland by the shipbuilder Henry Robb Ltd, the new vessel was completed in late 1929 and passed its sea trials in early 1930. The vessel departed Scotland on 11 February 1933 on the long voyage to Australia under the command of Captain William Manning, arriving in Sydney on 23 April. It was immediately placed into service under Captain Arthur Robert Bell, and assigned the task of freighting bulk blue metal (basalt aggregate) from Kiama on the NSW South Coast to Sydney, a round-trip distance of around 130 nautical miles (240 km; 150 mi) which the Bombo could complete in 22 hours. For the next six years the vessel typically completed five return trips per week from Kiama without significant mishap.

The Bombo's capability to weather difficult conditions was confirmed several times in the late 1930s. In February 1937, the vessel made its way to Sydney fully loaded during seas large enough to submerge her deck by several feet. A year later, shortly after leaving Kiama Harbour heading for Sydney, and again in treacherous conditions, she developed a severe list due to shifting load but once again continued safely to her destination.

In March 1938, the vessel's owners State Metal Quarries was sold, and the SS Bombo and her crew transferred to the new owner Quarries Pty Ltd. Shortly after, World War II broke out, and the Royal Australian Navy took an interest in using the Bombo for Australia's war effort.

=== World War II service ===
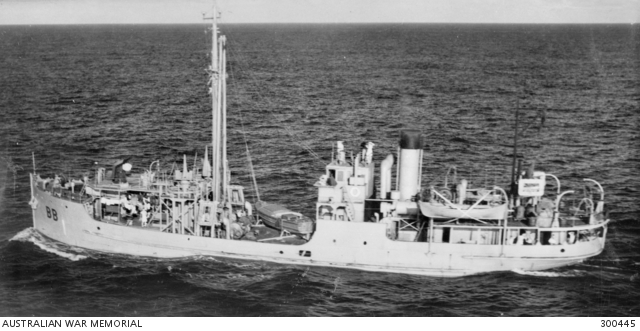
SS Bombo in service as HMAS Bombo, taken Feb 1944

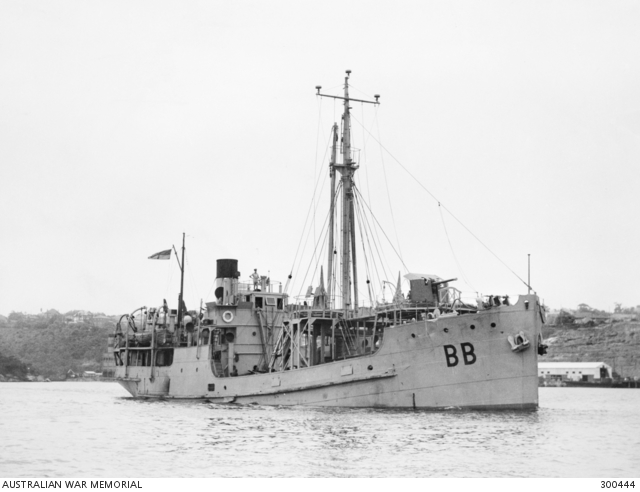
HMAS Bombo as stores-carrier in Sydney during WW2

The RAN requisitioned the Bombo in 1940 for service, and she was fitted-out in early 1941 as HMAS Bombo. Throughout her service she carried ship's pennant number FY12 and displayed the identification letters "BB" on her bows.

The most obvious changes made to the Bombo were the fitting of a mast amidships replacing the original deck crane, a smaller mainmast on the aft deck, and a range of armaments. Her initial assignment was as an auxiliary minesweeper, and for this role she was fitted with a 12-pound deck gun on an elevated platform forward, two heavy machine-guns amidships, and four anti-submarine depth charges set-up at the stern. In 1944 she was converted to a stores carrier, and modifications included replacing the machine-guns with twin platform-mounted 20mm Oerlikon anti-aircraft cannon, adding a protective shield to the 12-pounder, and fitting twin derricks to the midship mast.

The vessel spent much of its service life in waters to the north of Australia, being based in Darwin from 1943. At the conclusion of the Pacific War, HMAS Bombo relocated to Koepang in West Timor to participate in reconstruction, and was finally released by the RAN and returned to her civilian role in February 1946.

=== Post-war ===
In September 1947, the SS Bombo, refitted as a coastal steamer, returned to Kiama under the command of her pre-war master Captain Bell to resume her blue-metal carrier role. Also rejoining the vessel after the war years was the original cook Arthur Lightburn. The vessel passed Lloyds survey and an inspection by the Maritime Services Board in July 1948, with her lifeboat and lifesaving equipment for a crew of up to 16 reported in good-order. No significant incidents are believed to have occurred until what was to be her last voyage on 22 February 1949.

== Last voyage ==
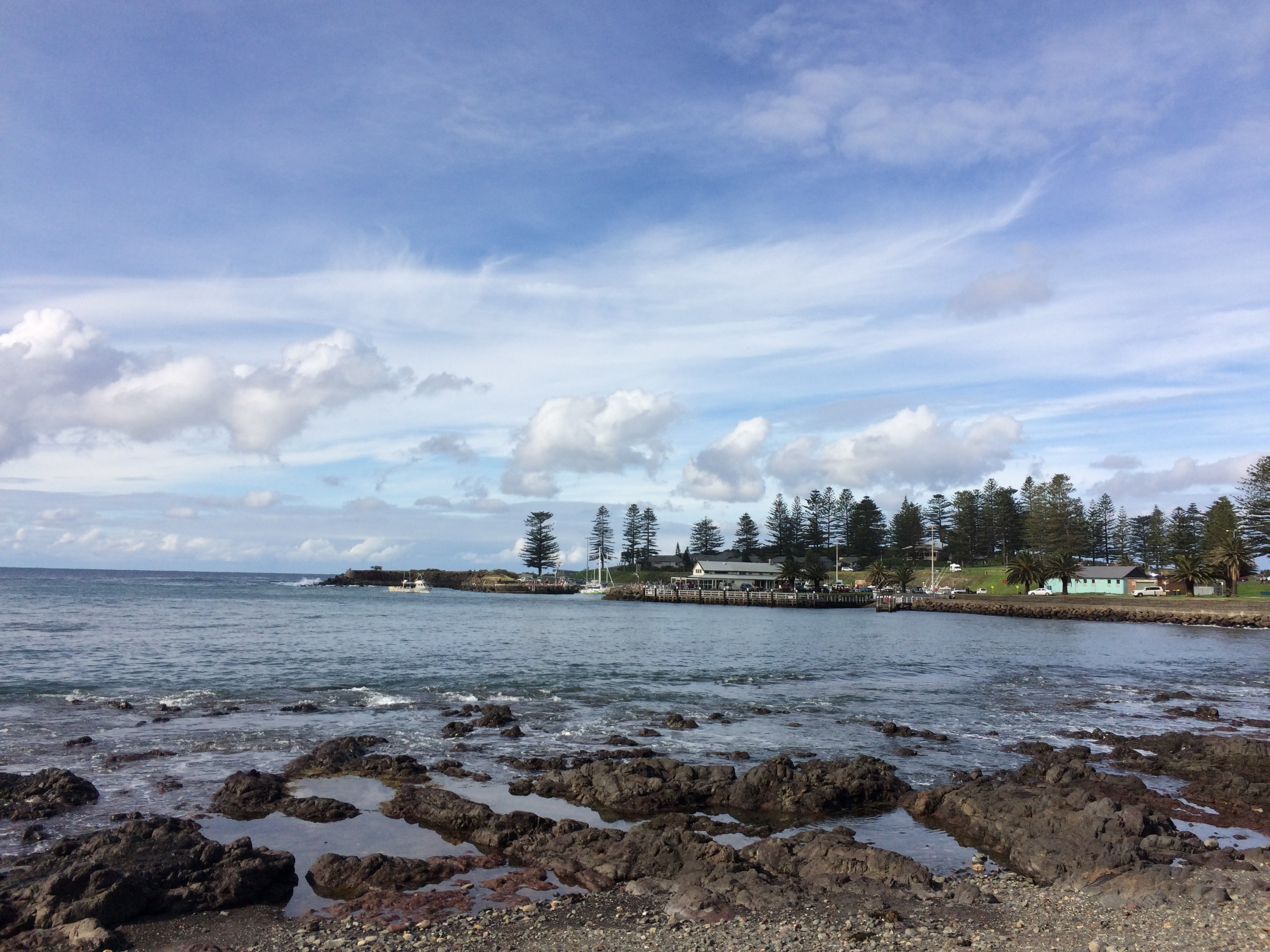
View of Kiama Harbour, final port of departure of SS Bombo

Early on the morning of 22 February 1949 the Bombo left Sydney for Kiama, arriving there at 9:40am. She immediately commenced loading another cargo of blue metal, and by 11:40am was ready to put to sea with 260 tonnes (260,000 kg) of stone in the forward hold and 380 tonnes (380,000 kg) in the aft. At the time, harbour conditions were calm with a light southerly blowing, but a strong southerly change was shortly expected.

In the early afternoon with the vessel just past the Five Islands offshore of Port Kembla, a "southerly buster" arrived - a gale-force southerly coastal wind change accompanied by heavy seas. Heavy rain greatly reduced visibility, and the big south-easterly swell hitting the Bombo on her stern starboard quarter made steerage difficult and at times the vessel broached into the passing seas.

By around 3pm, the Bombo was abeam Stanwell Park, a little under halfway to Sydney, and under full assault from the weather with her decks constantly awash under the huge seas. Over the next hour the Bombo's progress slowed as the conditions worsened more, and at 4pm with the vessel some 4 nautical miles (7.4 km; 4.6 mi) north of Stanwell Park a very large wave impacted the ship causing her to roll severely to port. As she righted, it became obvious that her cargo of loose aggregate had been shifted by the violent motion, resulting in a constant 5° list to the port side. Fearing for his ship's safety should this be repeated, Captain Bell ordered her nose to be turned into the oncoming seas and telegraphed the engine room to reduce speed. A man was sent forward to inspect the hatches and the cargo, and he reported back that load had indeed become unbalanced. Due to the size of the seas and depth of water coming across decks, any act of opening the hatches to square-up the blue metal cargo would have been fatal, so Captain Bell determined to make for the shelter of the Port Kembla harbour for the night, some 18 nautical miles (33 km; 21 mi) away.

At 5pm, a wireless message was sent by Captain Bell via the radio station at La Perouse to the stevedores at his Blackwattle Bay, Pyrmont destination, advising:

"Cancel gang tonight, hove to. OK master"

indicating that the unloading gang in Sydney would not be needed that night. This was the last communication received from the Bombo.

The Bombo steamed south at around 3 knots (5.6 km/h) for a good few hours, and by 9pm was just north of Wollongong lighthouse and approximately 4–5 miles (6.4–8.0 km) offshore. Captain Bell had told his crew his intention of sheltering at Port Kembla harbour for the night, and to that point things appeared to be in-hand with the vessel's post list stable and not increasing. With now only 5 nautical miles (9.3 km; 5.8 mi) to run until the safety of the harbour, fireman Michael Fitzsimmons went down to the engine room to stoke to the three boiler fires, usually a task taking a little over an hour.

Just on 9:30pm, Port Kembla harbour signalman Arthur Tremble spotted a vessel at sea to the north-east of the harbour and attempted to make contact with an Aldis lamp. The vessel answered but its signals were unable to be deciphered, most likely due to the roughness of the conditions. For the next 20 minutes Tremble maintained watch on the vessel with binoculars as it slowly closed on Port Kembla. At 9:50pm Tremble again requested identification, this time receiving the reply "Bombo" followed by "sheltering". Tremble confirmed receipt and the Bombo acknowledged, at which time the signalman recorded the events in his log. When he attempted to re-locate the vessel several minutes later he was unsuccessful, and concluded that the Bombo had turned into the small harbour at Wollongong just to the north.

At the time of the final signalling, Bombo was less than 15 minutes' steaming from the harbour entrance, and Michael Fitzsimmons had moved to tend to the third boiler fire. He was suddenly aware that the Bombo's list was increasing, and rapidly. In his words later quoted in the press:

"I didn't wait to finish that fire, but dropped the shovel and said to myself. 'Mike, it's time for you to go.'"

He fled from the engine room in time to hear Captain Bell calling for all hands to the deck and to man the starboard lifeboat. Six crewmen attempted to launch the lifeboat but the magnitude of the list made this impossible. Those crew able to get to the deck then gathered on the high starboard rail as the list continued to increase, until they all leapt into the water, followed shortly after by Captain Bell jumping from the bridge with capsize imminent. Within two minutes the Bombo had rolled over and sunk bow-first.

== Crew ordeal and survival ==
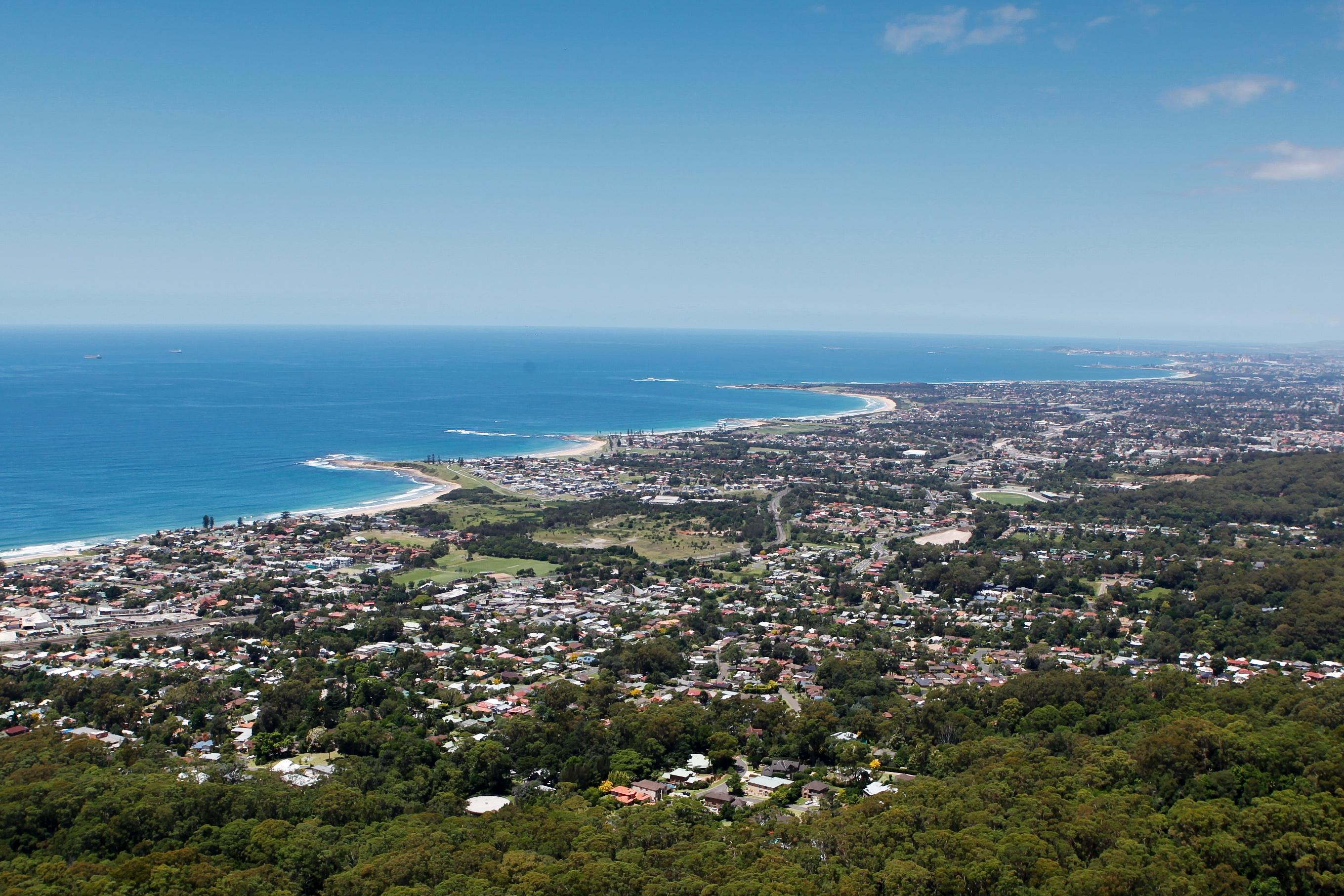
Coastline in Wollongong area. Port Kembla harbour to extreme right, Corrimal beach in centre, Bulli at left

Once the Bombo had disappeared beneath the waves, those crew able to escape the sinking vessel initially clung together to floating debris while being pounded in the dark by the atrocious conditions. Present were Captain Bell, Chief Officer Stringer and crewmen Fitzsimmons, Barhen, Cunningham, Norris, Stevenson, Lucy, Nagle and Thomsen. Four crew remained unaccounted for and are believed to have gone down with the vessel, being crewmen Carroll, Belvoir, Riddell and Lightburn. The ship's dog Brownie also effected escape.

Upon hearing from Captain Bell that no mayday signal had been sent, all the men present knew that no search for them was imminent, and that in the prevailing conditions their very survival was in jeopardy. The gale-force winds and seas were carrying the men north, and before much time had passed Chief Officer Henry Stringer, a strong swimmer, announced he would make for the shore in the direction of a red light assumed to be Bulli. He urged the Captain to keep the men together as he would have a boat come to rescue them. Charles Barhen followed the Chief Officer, and his body was never recovered. Stringer's body was found washed ashore on Corrimal beach at 11am the next morning, approximately 5 nautical miles (9.3 km; 5.8 mi) north of where the Bombo foundered.

The remaining eight crewmen clung to the wreckage throughout the night but by dawn the next morning, Captain Bell and seaman Bill Cunningham had succumbed to hypothermia and died, still afloat nearby in their life-jackets. Through the sea mist Norris spotted a beach several miles off. It was decided that each man should try to make his own way to shore, and so at intervals of maybe 15 minutes one-by-one the men left the floating planks and struck-out for the beach. Nagle, who didn't have a life-jacket, went first, followed by Thomsen and Fitzsimmons. After about an hour Fizsimmons passed the earlier two, still alive but near exhaustion, and at around 10am he stumbled onto Woonona beach where he flagged down a Hubbards Bakery truck driven by a Mr Hobbs, who took him to Bulli Police Station where he broke the news of the shipwreck.

Thomsen managed to continue the swim and spotted Nagle clinging to a floating hatch cover, although he later saw the cover on its own. At about the time that Fitzsimmons reached Woonona, Thomsen was spotted just outside the breaking surf off Bulli beach. A local lifeguard, Percy Ford, saw the swimmer and paddled a surf ski from nearby Shark Bay through mountainous seas to reach him. Thomsen hung onto the end of the ski while Ford fought to get them back to the beach, where Thomsen was carried to the kiosk before being taken to Bulli Hospital. Both Thomsen and Fitzsimmons had been in the water for around 12 hours since the sinking, and had drifted and swum through perilous seas over 8 nautical miles (15 km; 9.2 mi). They were to be the only survivors.

Brownie the ship's dog was found alive on Bulli beach, covered in grease and sand.

== Search ==
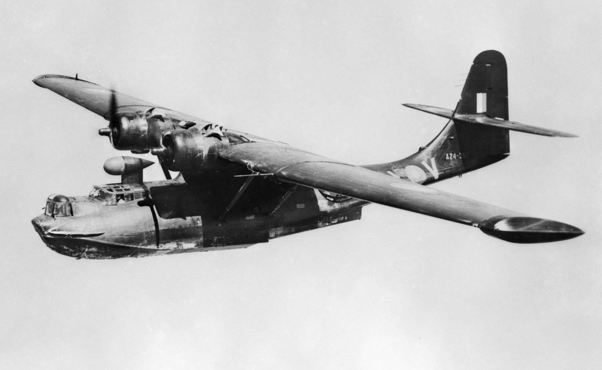
RAAF Catalina flying boat, two of which were used in the Bombo search.

The arrival of Thomsen and Fitzsimmons swiftly triggered an official search operation. Two R.A.A.F Catalina flying boats were dispatched from their base at Rathmines in Lake Macquarie near Newcastle, searching the coastline from Port Kembla in the south to Port Hacking in the north. An object thought to be a body was spotted in the water close to Stanwell Park and a marker dropped, however when the aircraft passed on its next sweep neither items could be found. In general the conditions for flying, let alone searching, were atrocious, and the Catalinas were returned to base after reporting:

"Coastal search impossible, heavy rain, low cloud along the cliffs, big seas and visibility almost nil"

Sea-based searching did not commence until mid-afternoon, when the Bombo's owners arranged for the tug Warung to leave Port Kembla to look for survivors. The local fishing trawler Pacific Gull, skippered alone by Albert Barnett, made the first discovery near Coledale, being the body of Captain Bell, still wearing his binoculars and cap. His wristwatch had stopped at 10:15. Barnett spotted more bodies closer to shore, but the conditions made it too dangerous to attempt to retrieve them. Further searching was carried out the next day, including by a Tiger Moth aircraft of South Coast Aviation Services, but the bodies of the remaining ten men were never found.

== Inquiry and findings ==
A Court of Marine Inquiry, presided over by Judge Stacey, commenced in Sydney on 6 April 1949. Evidence was given that both holds of the vessel were loaded and trimmed properly, the hatches secured and covered with tarpaulins, and both battened down. The pilot noted that the Plimsoll line was well visible, indicating the vessel was carrying less than its maximum capacity. The Chairman of Quarries Pty Ltd, the ship's owners, testified that Captain Bell had had command of the SS Bombo for the life of the ship with the company, that he was a sober, efficient and most reliable Master, and that he had operated on the blue metal trading run from Kiama to Sydney for most of the previous 25 years.

The two surviving crewmen, Thomsen and Fitzsimmons, gave evidence that the capsize was so swift that nothing more could have been done to avert the tragedy. Both were of the firm opinion that the shifting of the blue metal load was responsible for the listing of the vessel, and somehow for its final demise. They were unanimous in their praise for the efforts of Captain Bell to save the vessel, and for his example and leadership during and after its foundering.

In his concluding remarks Judge Stacey stated that:

"The Court finds that the ship was properly loaded, and handled in a seaman-like manner by her Master. It finds there is no evidence on which any findings can be made as to the actual cause of the ship foundering."

== Memorials ==
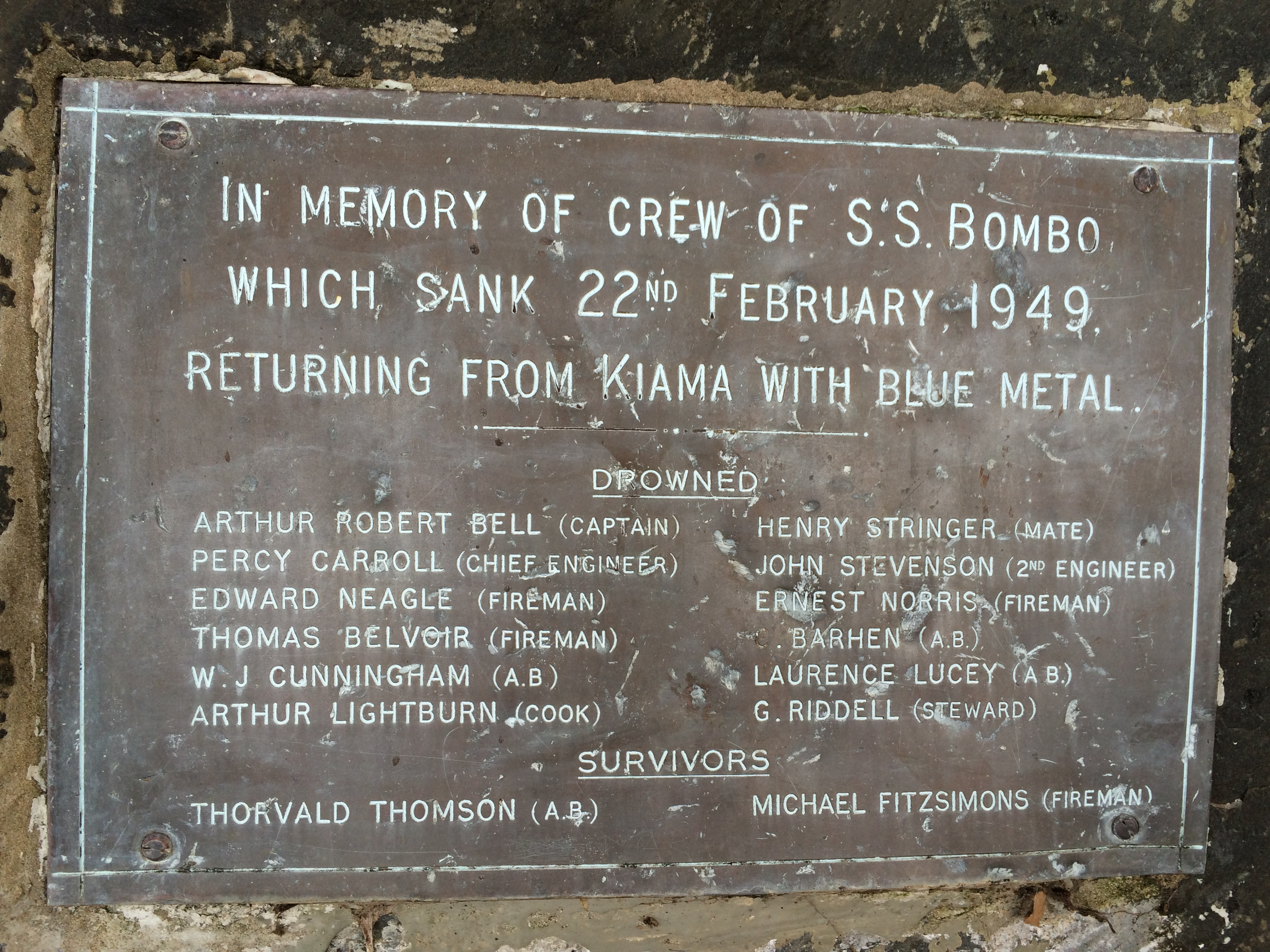
Memorial plaque to crew of SS Bombo, Kiama NSW

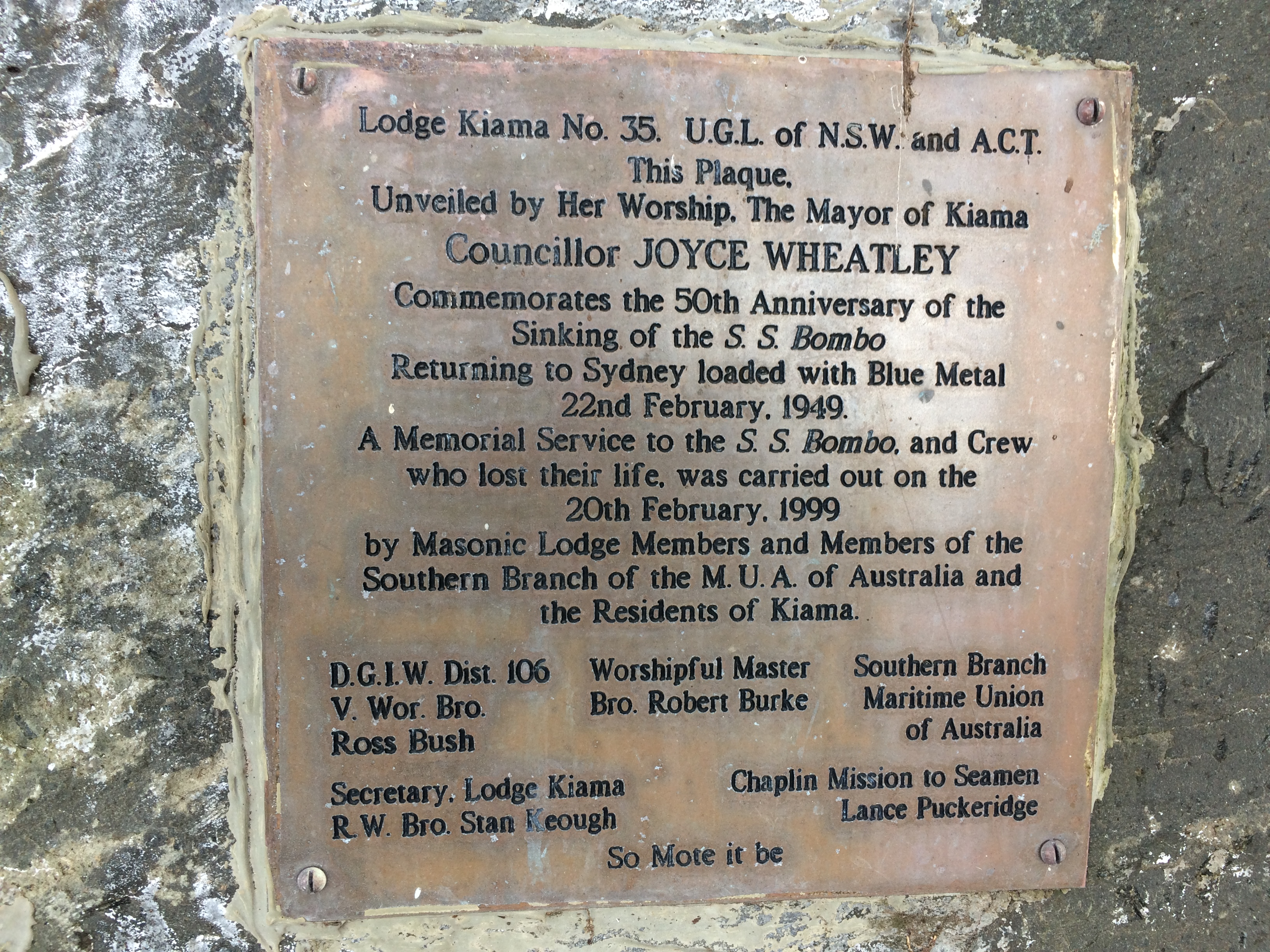
50th Anniversary memorial plaque, Kiama NSW

A memorial plaque is erected at Black Beach, Kiama adjacent to the final departure port of the SS Bombo at Kiama Harbour, and approximately 25 kilometres (16 mi) south of where the vessel foundered.

The plaque contains the following text:

IN MEMORY OF CREW OF SS BOMBO
WHICH SANK 22ND FEBRUARY 1949
RETURNING FROM KIAMA WITH BLUE METAL

DROWNED
ARTHUR ROBERT BELL (CAPTAIN)
HENRY STRINGER (MATE)
PERCY CARROLL (CHIEF ENGINEER)
JOHN STEVENSON (2ND ENGINEER)
EDWARD NEAGLE (FIREMAN)
ERNEST NORRIS (FIREMAN)
THOMAS BELVOIR (FIREMAN)
C. BAHREN (A.B.)
W.J.CUNNINGHAM (A.B.)
LAURENCE LUCEY (A.B.)
ARTHUR LIGHTBURN (COOK)
G. RIDDELL (STEWARD)

SURVIVORS
THORVALD THOMSON (A.B.)
MICHAEL FITZSIMONS (FIREMAN)

A second plaque at the same location was dedicated on 20 February 1999 on the occasion of the 50th anniversary Memorial Service of the vessel's sinking. This plaque is ascribed to the Members of the Masonic Lodge of Kiama, the Members of the Southern Branch of the Maritime Union of Australia (M.U.A.), and the Residents of Kiama. It was unveiled by the then Mayor of Kiama, Councillor Joyce Wheatley.

== See also ==
- Shipwrecks of Australia
- List of shipwrecks in 1949
- Stone Fleet (New South Wales)
