= SS Katowice =

Polish steamship, 1925 to 1949

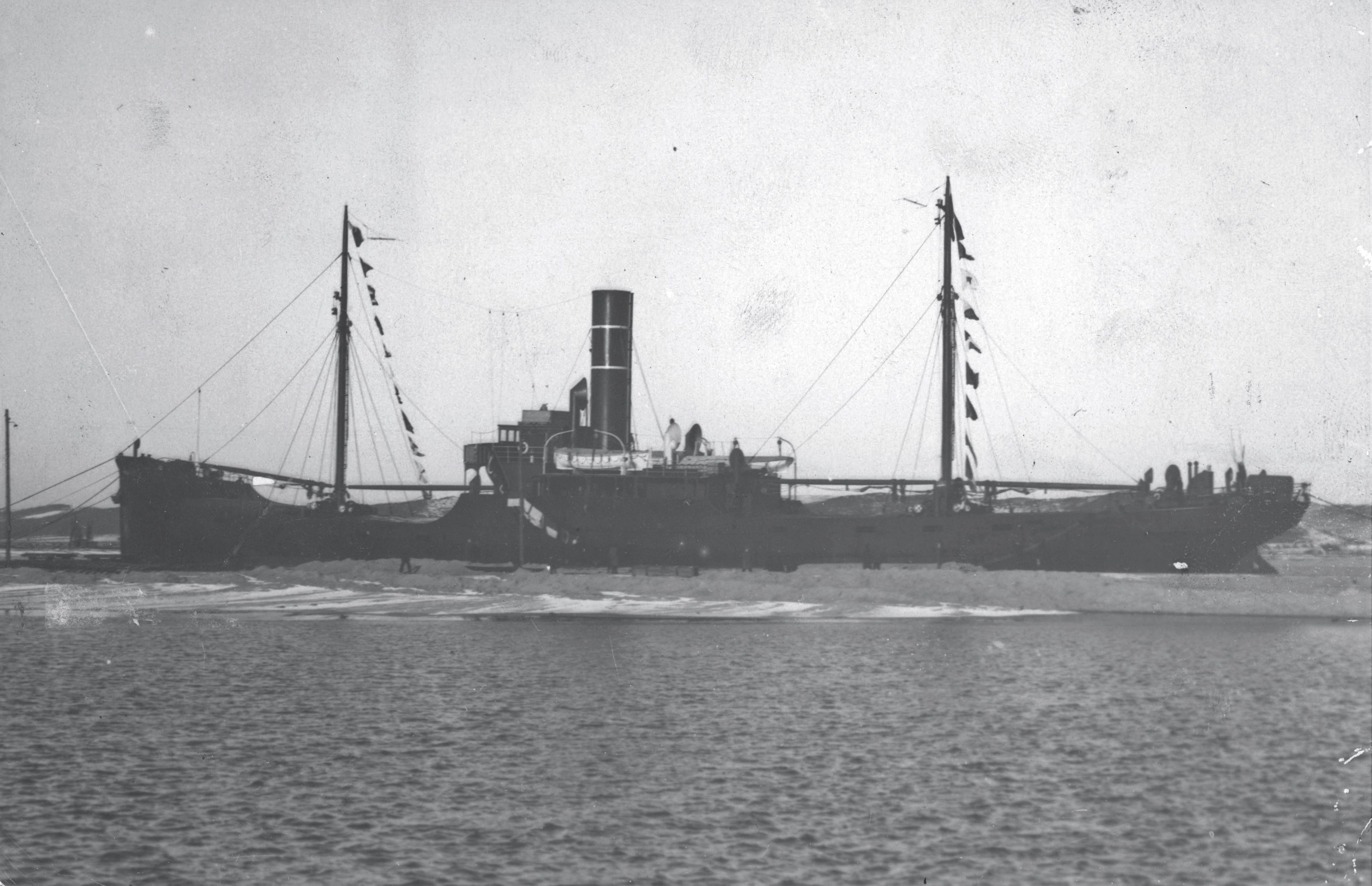
- Ship in 1927

History

United Kingdom
- Name: Vendemiaire
- Owner: Constants France
- Port of registry: Cardiff
- Builder: Chantiers Navals Français, Blainville (engine by Ateliers et Chantiers de la Loire, Nantes)
- Yard number: 37

Poland
- Owner: Polish Ocean Lines
- Operator: Polish Ocean Lines
- Acquired: 1926
- Out of service: 1 March 1949
- Renamed: Katowice
- Fate: wrecked at Terschelling, the Netherland on 1 March 1949

General characteristics
- Tonnage: 1994 BRT
- Length: 82.4 m (270 ft 4 in)
- Beam: 12.2 m (40 ft 0 in)
- Depth: 5.4 m (17 ft 9 in)
- Installed power: 189 nhp
- Speed: 9.5 knots (17.6 km/h; 10.9 mph)
- Capacity: One 3-cylinder triple expansion steam engine, single shaft, one screw, two single boilers, four corrugated furnaces

SS Katowice, originally named SS Vendemiaire, was a 1925-built, 82-metre (269 ft)-long Polish merchant steamship. It was owned by Polish Ocean Lines and was registered in Gdynia.

The ship served during World War II, including at Normandy landings.

On 1 March 1949 the ship wrecked on Terschelling, the Netherlands. The crew members were rescued.

== Ship details ==
The ship had an iron hull, and measured 82.4 metres (270 ft 4 in) by 12.2 metres (40 ft 0 in) and had a draught of 5.5 m (18 ft 1 in). She was assessed at 1,995 BRT. The ship had one two-cylinder compound steam engine a single shaft, one screw and three masts.

== History ==
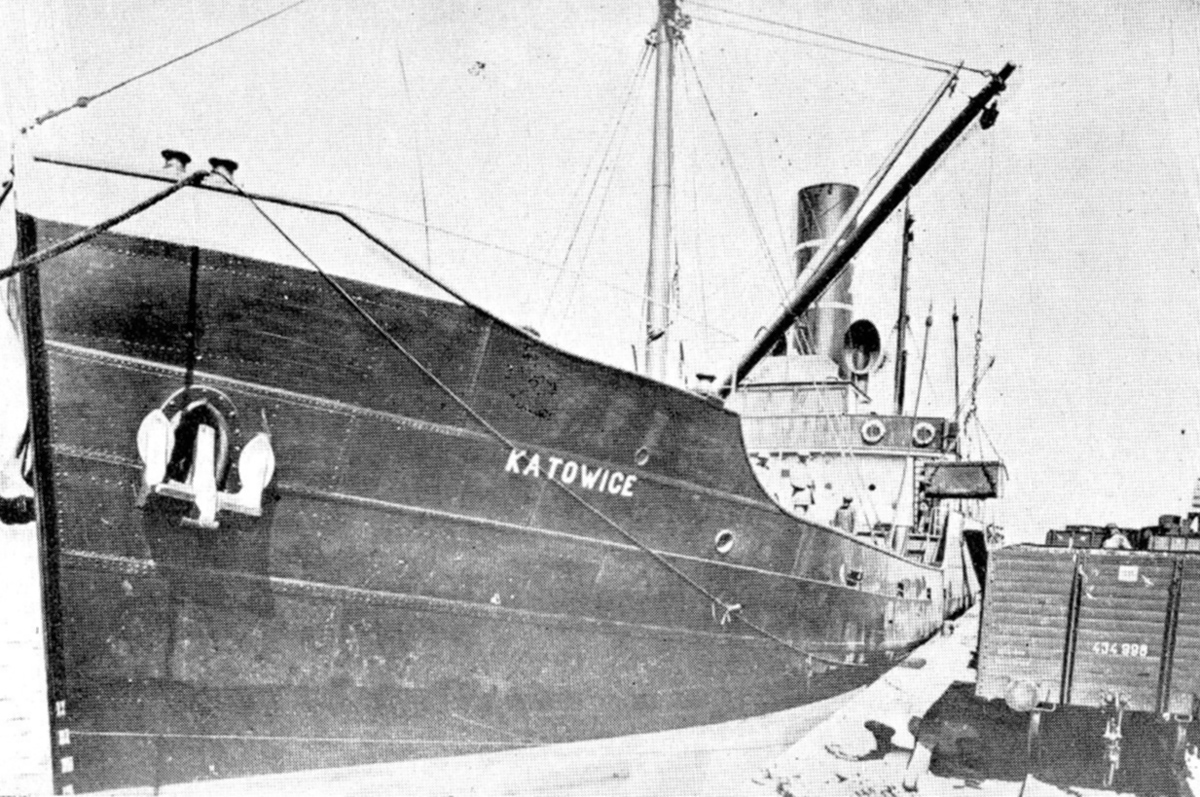
The ship in 1927

The ship was built in 1925 by Chantiers Navals Français, Blainville and its engine by Ateliers et Chantiers de la Loire, Nantes. It was launched under the British flag as the SS Vendemiaire. Around 1926 it became property of the Polish Ocean Lines and was renamed Katowice.

The ship travelled on the Baltic Sea and North Sea to ports in Sweden and to Preston in the United Kingdom. She also traveled to the Mediterranean Sea. On 23 August 1939, she was on a voyage from Gdańsk to Italy with captain Bohdan Gawęcki.

=== World War II ===
The ship left Genoa, Italy during the night of 25 September on voyage to Marseille, France. On 18 November she was traveling to Sète. From that moment on, the ship began to serve in the “Mission des Transports Maritimes”. Captain Ostapowice was captain of the ship during World War II.

In 1940, the ship came under British command but still with the Polish flag. She went among others to Canada. At the end of World War II she served off the coast of England. She was one of the ships that took part at the Normandy landings.

=== Fate ===
In March 1949 the ship with captain K. Ostapowicz was on voyage to Poland. In Vlissingen, the Netherlands a valuable cargo of rawhide and tanning material had been taken onboard from the Polish SS Kulaski that had had a collision at Westerschelde with the Dutch SS Lissekerk and was severely damaged. North of the Dutch islands the ship encountered a storm. The ship ran aground on the northern grounds of Terschelling and shortly afterwards the ship broke in two behind the engine room. At 10am the captain gave an emergency signal and the Dutch lifeboat Brandaris II 2 sailed to the ship and came alongside about an hour later. The anchor of the lifeboat got stuck behind the railing of Katowice but (fortunately) the anchor chain broke. The lifeboat came multiple times alongside the boat and the Polish crew jumped into the safety net of the lifeboat. Sailor Douwe Tot received the gold rescue medal, that has only been awarded a few times. Klaas Tot (his son), Jaap de Beer and Eelke R. de Beer received the silver medal. Later they also received a high Polish award.

23 of the rescued crew members went with an extra KLM airplane back to Poland.

=== Cargo ===
Video of salvage of the cargo

The cargo had a value of over 2 million Guilders. Many of the 27,000 skins have been salvaged by "Doeksen" shipping company.

Sloop no.2 of the ship washed ashore at Den Helder. It was discovered that the water tanks and air lockers were full of cigarettes and nylon stockings. It also turned out that there had been 80,000 smuggled cigarettes on board.

=== Auction ===
In April 1949 a public sale took place at the former Beurs-World Trade Center in Rotterdam. Most of the skins were bought by foreigners.

== Wreck dives ==
From the 1980s many divers went to the ship. It still contained many skins. In 2010 the condenser and spare propeller was salvaged. That propeller is now part of the beachcombers museum on Texel.
