= SS Prinses Astrid =

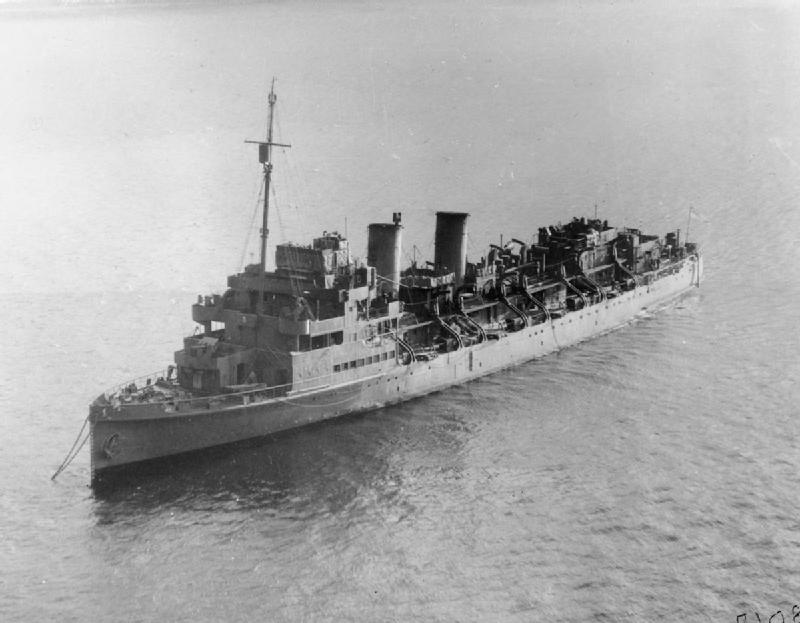
- SS Prinses Astrid as HMS Prinses Astrid during her military service in the Royal Navy

History
- Name: (Belgium) SS Prinses Astrid (1930–1940); (United Kingdom) HMS Prinses Astrid (1940–1945); (Belgium) SS Prinses Astrid (1945–1949)
- Namesake: Astrid of Sweden
- Owner: Belgian Government (1930–1940); Royal Navy (1940–1945); Armement Adolf Deppe (1945–1949)
- Port of registry: Belgium, Antwerp, Belgium
- Route: Ostend-Dover
- Ordered: 1929
- Builder: Cockerill John S. A.
- Yard number: 638
- Laid down: 1929
- Launched: 20 July 1929
- Completed: April 1930
- Acquired: April 1930
- Maiden voyage: 24 April 1930
- In service: 24 April 1930
- Fate: Struck a mine and sank 21 June 1949

General characteristics
- Type: cross-Channel ferry
- Tonnage: 3,300 GRT
- Length: 113 m (370 ft 9 in)
- Beam: 16 m (52 ft 6 in)
- Depth: 3.6 m (11 ft 10 in)
- Decks: 4
- Installed power: 6 steam turbines
- Propulsion: 2 screws
- Speed: 23.5 knots (44 km/h)
- Capacity: 1,400
- Crew: 65

SS Prinses Astrid was a Belgian cross-Channel ferry which struck a naval mine 3 nautical miles (5.6 km) off the coast of Dunkirk, France and sank with the loss of five of her 65 crew. All 60 survivors and 218 passengers on board were rescued by SS Cap Hatid (France) and various tugs from Dunkirk.

== Construction ==
SS Prinses Astrid was built in Hoboken, Antwerp, Belgium at the Cockerill shipyard in 1929 as a cross-Channel ferry for the Belgian Government. She was launched on 20 July 1929 and completed in April 1930. She made her maiden voyage from Ostend to Dover on 24 April 1930. The ship was 113 metres (370 ft 9 in) long, with a beam of 16 metres (52 ft 6 in) and a depth of 3.6 metres (11 ft 10 in). The ship was assessed at 3,300 GRT. She had six steam turbines driving two screw propellers and the engine was rated at 2.779 nhp. She could also carry 2,950 tons of cargo as well as 1,400 passengers and 65 crew.

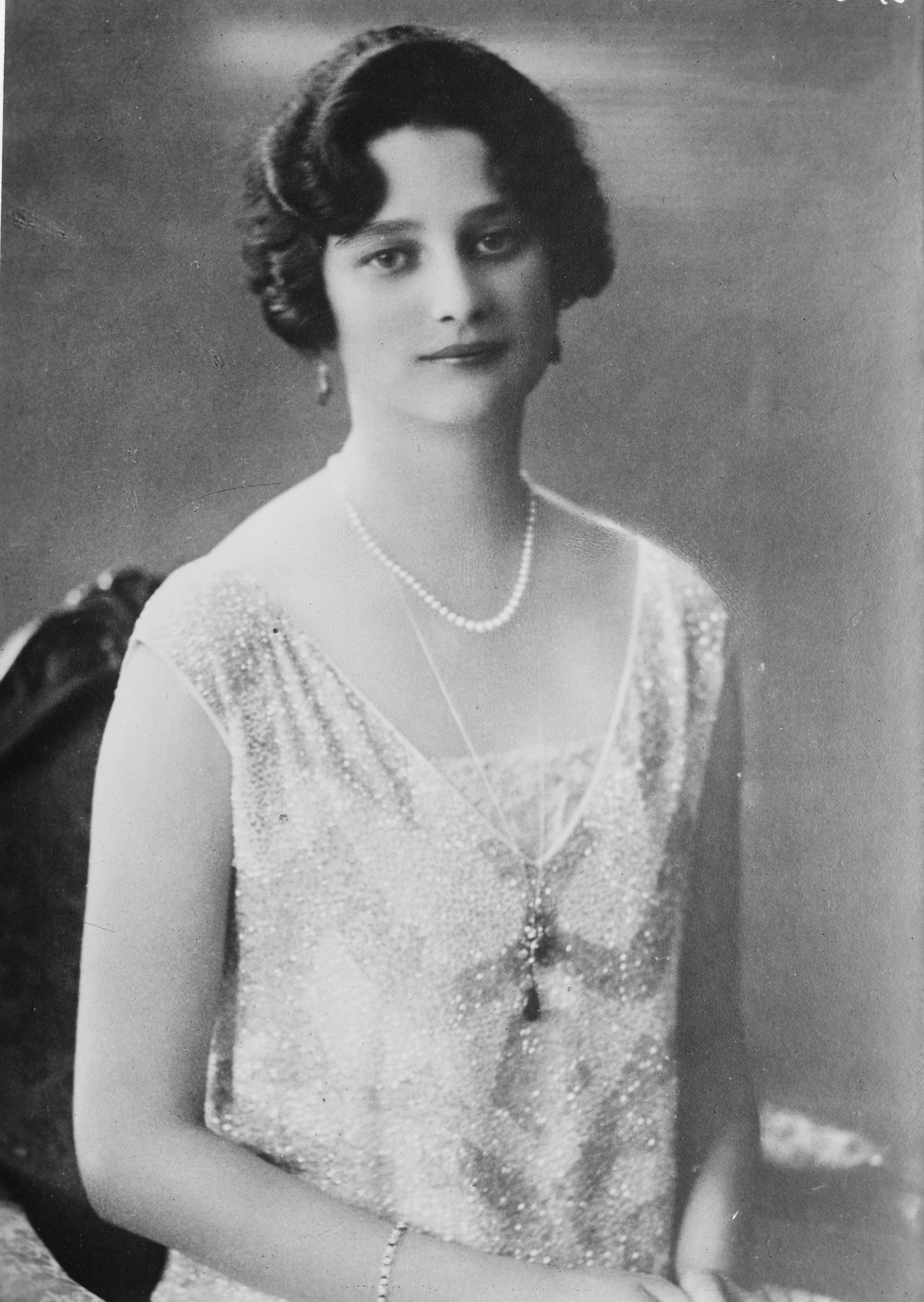
The ship was named after Princess Astrid of Sweden who was the Queen of Belgium at the time.

== Pre-War career ==
From 1930 to 1940, Prinses Astrid was a cross-Channel ferry which was operated by the Belgian Government and sailed the Ostend-Dover line.

== World War II ==
When Germany invaded Belgium on 10 May 1940, many Belgian citizens fled their country. On 18 May 1940, Prinses Astrid left Ostend harbor with Belgian refugees en route to Southampton, United Kingdom. From 23 May 1940 forward, Prinses Astrid sailed for the British Ministry of War Transport and she was used for the evacuation of 1,556 English soldiers from France in Operation Aerial from 12 June to 15 June 1940 following Belgium's surrender. She was also used for the evacuation of the Channel Islands Jersey and Guernsey between 20 June and 22 June 1940.

Prinses Astrid sailed with an Ostend crew until 27 September 1940, on 28 September 1940 she was taken over by the British Royal Navy. In January 1941, the ship was taken to the Naval Dockyard in Devonport where she was rebuilt to a Landing Ship Infantry and on 26 May 1941, Prinses Astrid was renamed HMS Prinses Astrid (LSI(S)-4226).

In June 1941, HMS Prinses Astrid sailed to Inveraray to join the fleet which remained stand-by for the landing in the Azores (Operation Truster). As preparation for the operation in August 1941, Prinses Astrid was sent to Scapa Flow for training. Due to electrical problems, the ship was not able to participate in Operation Truster. On 20 September 1941, Prinses Astrid arrived in Inveraray to serve as an accommodation ship for Combined Operations Training Classes.

After other repairs, the ship was ready for Operation Jubilee. The ship left Portsmouth on 18 August 1942 at 20:24 pm as part of group 3 en route to Blue Beach in Dieppe. The ship led her landing crafts with Canadian troops safely down at 2:58 am on 19 August before returning to the Solent.

On 10 June 1943, Prinses Astrid left Falmouth for Gibraltar and the North African ports of Oran, Algiers, Bizerta, and Philippeville, where she arrived on 7 July 1943.

For Operation Husky, Prinses Astrid picked up U.S. Rangers in the Jos Attack-gebied near Licata on 10 July 1943. She joined the Northern Attack Force and left Tripoli on 6 September 1943 for Operation Avalanche for the landing near Salerno on 9 September 1943. The ship left Algiers on 27 October 1943 en route to the UK and became a Submarine Target Ship.

Prinses Astrid left the Solent on 5 June 1944 as part of the Assault Convoy S7. On 6 June 1944 at 05:42 am, the ship lay off Sword beachhead in order to disembark her troops during the invasion of Normandy on D-day. Afterwards, the ship made multiple crossings with new troops for the Eastern and Western Task Force with Newhaven and Southampton as main ports. The ship returned to the Solent and followed the Calais–Southampton line on 26 December 1944. After that, she moved to the Tilbury–Ostend Force Duty. From 17 January 1945 to 12 February 1945, the ship sailed the Harwich-Calais line.

=== Accidents ===
Prinses Astrid was involved in a collision on 16 May 1942 with a tank landing ship. She was repaired and was at the same time modified to participate in Operation Rutter, better known as the raid on Dieppe. The raid was planned for July 1942, but was cancelled due to bad weather. On 7 July 1942 at 6:15 am, Prinses Astrid was hit by a bomb while in the Solent. The bomb hit C deck but bounced off the upper structure of a landing craft located on the side of C deck and exploded in the water.

In February 1943, Prinses Astrid sailed into Dartmouth to take in new landing craft. When she sailed into the harbor, she collided with a crane arm which bent all the ship's starboard screw propellers and a cable was lodged in the port screw. The ship's starboard turbine was sabotaged in January 1944 and she was taken out of service for four weeks. On 18 October 1944 Prinses Astrid collided with a dredger, her Davits and whaler were damaged. On 28 November 1944 near Avonmouth, a fire broke out in the ship's kitchen and was quickly put out.

Prinses Astrid collided with Seapool off Gravesend on 1 January 1945 and left her starboard side damaged. On 12 February 1945, the ship collided with the porthead of Calais which left a 2.1 by 1.2 metres (6 ft 11 in by 3 ft 11 in) hole under the ship's waterline. Because of this accident, Prinses Astrid was taken out of service again to be repaired, because of that decision the ship could not participate in Operation Nestegg which was the liberation of the Channel Islands.

== Return to Belgian service ==
On 10 April 1945, having survived many incidents, Prinses Astrid was returned to Belgium and sailed under a Belgian crew again. She was also renamed SS Prinses Astrid. From 15 February 1946 to 12 July 1946, Prinses Astrid sailed as a troop transport ship between Dover and Ostend under the Belgian flag. After a number of renovation works, the ship was returned to service on 7 October 1946 as a cross-Channel ferry sailing the Ostend-Dover line.

== Sinking ==
Prinses Astrid left Ostend, Belgium at 14:30 pm on 21 June 1949 with 65 crew members and 218 passengers for Dover, United Kingdom. At 16:20 pm a violent explosion rocked through the ship, she had struck a World War II magnetic mine near the middle of the ship, 3 nautical miles (5.6 km) off the coast of Dunkirk, France and began to take on water.

Captain Timmermans sailed the ship into shallow waters in order to prevent it from sinking and ground the ship. Meanwhile, the radio operator sent out an SOS call which was picked up by all ships near Dunkirk. All of the ships rushed to the stricken ship's aid including the cargo ship SS Cap Hatid, various tugs, the trailer Les trois Frères and a giant lifeboat named Amiral Ronarch.

While Prinses Astrid was steaming to shallow waters, an evacuation was issued by the crew at the orders of the captain. Women and children were lowered first into the lifeboats and later the men and crew. The evacuation proceeded very calmly as there was enough room for the passengers in the ship's nine lifeboats and since the evacuation was very well coordinated. The captain was the last to leave the ship at 17:48 pm, shattering his leg between the lifeboat and the ship in the process.

At 18:00 pm Prinses Astrid gained a 45-degree list before finally sinking at 18:03 pm. Since the ship sank in shallow water, Prinses Astrid quickly came to rest on a sandbank and her upper deck with the funnels stayed above the water.

There was however loss of life, 5 crew members died in the engine room when the mine exploded and 15 people suffered major burns, 4 others including the captain were slightly injured. In total: 60 crew members and all 218 passengers survived the sinking, most of the survivors were rescued by Cap Hatid and brought ashore at Dunkirk.

It was later discovered that the mine that Prinses Astrid hit was one of eight mines which were never found by the navy. The British Royal Navy however denied this claim and stated that a boiler must have exploded since they had full faith that the bomb squads of the Royal Navy had successfully cleaned the English Channel of mines.

== Wreck ==
The wreck is still on the sandbank to this day. In the years following the sinking, passing ships could see the ship's two funnels sticking out of the water and at low tide even the upper decks. As it lay along a busy sea lane it was seen regularly by passengers of passing steamers and became a sort of monument. The site was however also perfect for robbers, but nothing was ever stolen due to the strong and dangerous currents that surround the wreck. Today a buoy marks the site of the wreck as the ship's bow has disappeared completely beneath the sandy sea-bed. Many divers still visit the wreck but can only access the stern since the bow is buried in the sand. Many artifacts such as washbasins and railings can be found around or on the wreck.
