= SS Guararema =

Coastal cargo steamship

History
- Name: 1918 War Avon; 1919 Independance; 1921 Mavis; 1929 Sound Fisher; 1939 Guararema
- Owner: 1919: Neptunus Soc D'Armement; 1921: General Steam Nav Co; 1929: J Fisher & Sons; 1939: Emp Intl de Transportes
- Operator: 1919: M Smits & Co
- Port of registry: 1919 (Belgium) Antwerp; 1921 (United Kingdom) London; 1929 (United Kingdom) Barrow; 1939 (Brazil) Rio de Janeiro
- Builder: Ardrossan DD and Sb Co, Ardrossan
- Yard number: 302
- Launched: October 1918
- Completed: 27 January 1919
- Refit: 1937
- Identification: 1921: UK official number 142774; 1929: code letters KJMH; 1934: call sign MKSN; 1939: Brazilian official number 774; 1939: call sign PVAB
- Fate: sunk by collision, 1949

General characteristics
- Class & type: War Standard C1 coaster
- Tonnage: 1919: 501 GRT, 226 NRT; 1937: 548 GRT, 274 NRT
- Length: 1919: 142.4 ft (43.4 m); 1937: 154.8 ft (47.2 m)
- Beam: 26.1 ft (8.0 m)
- Draught: 12 ft 3 in (3.73 m)
- Depth: 10.9 ft (3.3 m)
- Decks: 1
- Installed power: 1 × compound engine: 59 RHP; 91 NHP; 500 ihp
- Propulsion: 1 × screw
- Speed: 9 knots (17 km/h)

SS Guararema was a coastal steamship, built in Scotland as a member of the United Kingdom's War Standard Class C1. it was launched in 1918 as War Avon; but completed in 1919 for a Belgian shipowner as Independance.

In 1921 the General Steam Navigation Company bought her, and renamed it Mavis. In 1929 a shipowner in Barrow-in-Furness bought it, and renamed it Sound Fisher. In 1937 her hull was lengthened.

In 1939 a Brazilian shipowner bought it, and renamed her Guararema. it was sunk in a collision off the coast of Brazil in 1949.

== Building and registration ==
The Ardrossan Dry Dock and Shipbuilding Company in Ardrossan, Ayrshire, built the ship as yard number 302. She was launched for the Shipping Controller in October 1918 as War Avon. Her registered length was 142.4 ft (43.4 m); her beam was 26.1 ft (8.0 m); her depth was 10.9 ft (3.3 m); and her draught was 12 ft 3 in (3.73 m). Her tonnages were 501 GRT and 226 NRT.

She had a single screw, driven by a two-cylinder compound engine that was rated at 59 RHP; 91 NHP; or 500 ihp, and gave her a speed of 9 knots (17 km/h). Her engine room and single funnel were aft.

On 27 January 1919 she was completed as Independance for the Neptunus Societé D'Armement, who registered her in Antwerp.

== British service ==
In 1921, the General Steam Navigation Company bought Independance and renamed her Mavis. She was registered in London, and her UK official number was 142774.

In 1929, James Fisher and Sons bought her; renamed her Sound Fisher; and registered her in Barrow. Her code letters were KJMH. By 1934, her call sign was MKSN, and this had superseded her code letters. In 1937, Fisher had Sound Fisher lengthened by 12.4 feet (3.8 m). This increased her tonnages to 548 GRT and 274 NRT.

== Brazilian service and loss ==
In 1939, the Empresa Internacional de Transportes bought Sound Fisher and renamed her Guararema. She was registered in Rio de Janeiro; her Brazilian official number was 774, and her call sign was PVAB.

On 4 March 1949, Guararema was en route from Santos when she was involved in a collision with a steamship called Britannia. (Note: The 1949 edition of Lloyd's Register lists six ships called Britannia. Wrecksite fails to identify which Britannia collided with Guararema.) She sank at position 23°59′54″S 46°19′30″W, on the Santos bar off the Ilha des Palmas. There were no casualties.

== Bibliography ==
- Lloyd's Register of Shipping. Vol. II.–Steamers. London: Lloyd's Register of Shipping. 1919 – via Internet Archive.
- Lloyd's Register of Shipping. Vol. II.–Steamers and Motor Vessels. London: Lloyd's Register of Shipping. 1922 – via Internet Archive.
- Lloyd's Register of Shipping (PDF). Vol. II.–Steamers and Motorships of 300 tons gross and over. London: Lloyd's Register of Shipping. 1934 – via Southampton City Council.
- Lloyd's Register of Shipping (PDF). Vol. II.–Steamers and Motorships of 300 tons gross and over. London: Lloyd's Register of Shipping. 1937 – via Southampton City Council.
- Lloyd's Register of Shipping (PDF). Vol. II.–Steamers and Motorships of 300 tons gross and over. London: Lloyd's Register of Shipping. 1940 – via Southampton City Council.
- Mercantile Navy List. London: Registrar General of Shipping and Seamen. 1930 – via Crew List Index Project.
