= Meroo Meadow =

- Town
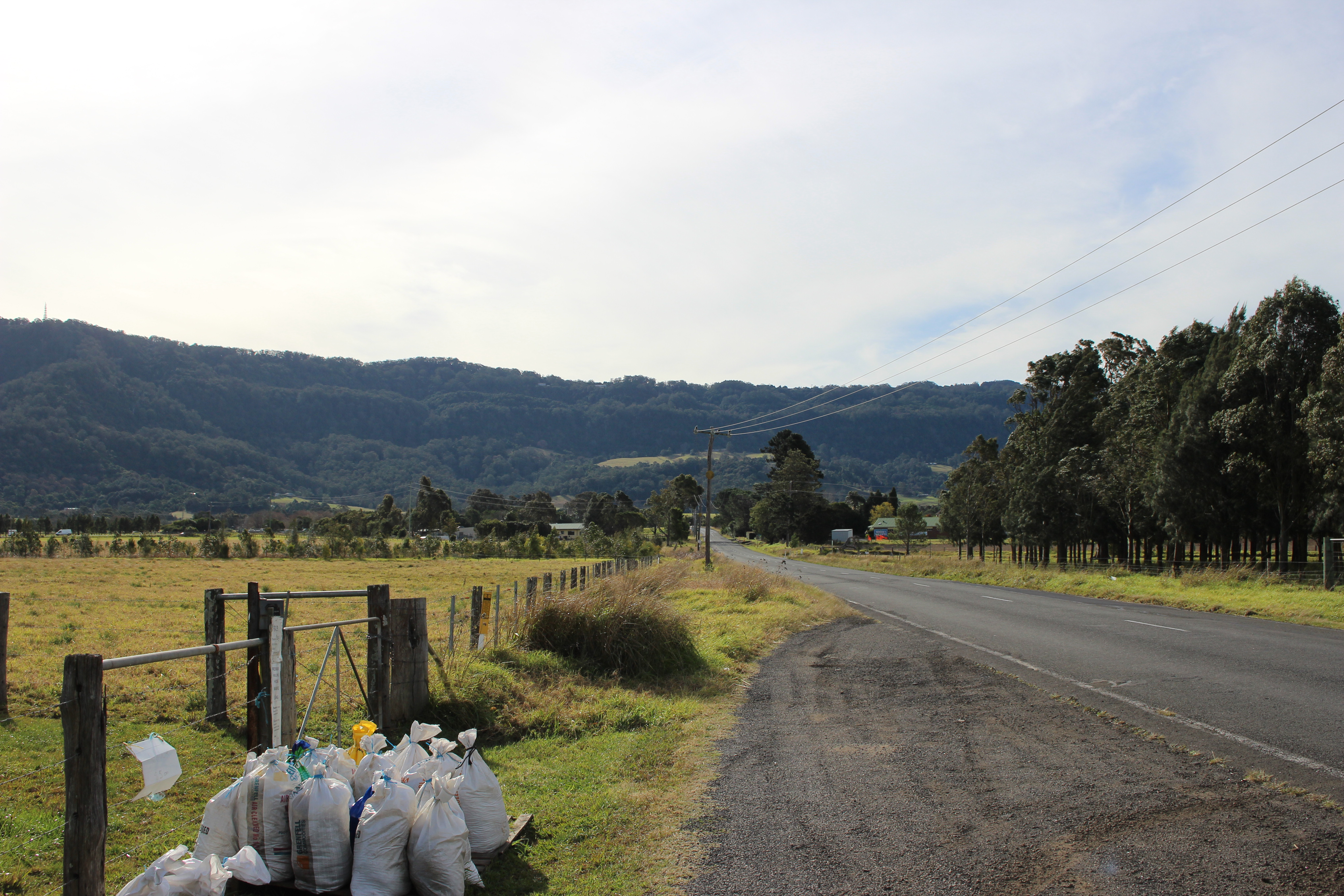

- Coordinates: 34°48′57″S 150°37′02″E
- Country: Australia
- State: New South Wales
- Region: Illawarra
- LGA: City of Shoalhaven
- Location: 151 km (94 mi) S of Sydney; 9 km (5.6 mi) N of Nowra; 33 km (21 mi) SW of Kiama

Government
  - State electorate: Kiama
  - Federal division: Gilmore
- Elevation: 34 m (112 ft)

Population
  - Total: 474 (2021 census)
- Postcode: 2540
- County: Camden
- Parish: Bunberra
Localities around Meroo Meadow
| Beaumont | Bellawongarah | Jaspers Brush |
| Cambewarra | Meroo Meadow | Jaspers Brush |
| Cambewarra | Bomaderry | Bolong |

Meroo Meadow is a suburb in the City of Shoalhaven in New South Wales, Australia. It lies on the Princes Highway about 33 km southwest of Kiama and 9 km north of Nowra. At the 2021 census, it had a population of 474.
