= Broughton (Indigenous Australian) =

Dharawal man, guide and explorer

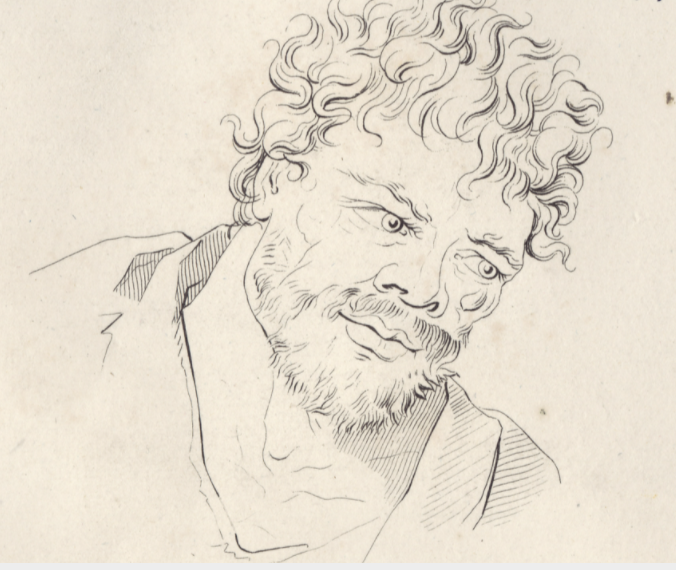
Portrait of Broughton in 1819 by Jacques Arago

Broughton (c.1798 – c.1850), whose traditional name was Toodwik or Toodwit, and who was also known as Broten and Billy Broughton, was an Indigenous Australian man of the Dharawal people from what is now called the Shoalhaven region of New South Wales.

Broughton played a significant role in the early stages of British colonisation of coastal New South Wales as both a guide and intermediary for the colonists, and also as a representative for his own people.

== Early life ==
Broughton was born at or near Boon-ga-ree (now known as the town of Berry, New South Wales) around 1798. He probably first came into contact with British colonists around 1810 when cedar-getters and stockmen started to enter the Illawarra region. By 1817, he was well known to the colonist Charles Throsby who had land interests in the area. Throsby gave Toodwik the name of Broughton, more than likely after William Broughton, a friend of Throsby who had also emigrated to New South Wales.

== Explorer and guide for Charles Throsby ==
Broughton evidently learned English and European customs from Throsby who took him to Sydney and to his property at Glenfield at the very north of Dharawal country. Throsby was very active in the search for new grazing land and to open up an inland route from his property at Glenfield to the Illawarra coast. In 1818, Throsby, together with Hamilton Hume Joseph Wild and James Meehan, led an expedition to find a suitable path from Campbelltown through the mountains and down to the coast at Jervis Bay. Throsby appointed Broughton and another Dharawal man named Bundel as their main guides for the expedition.

Broughton and Bundel led the group through Gandangara country to Bundanoon and Marulan, before descending along Bundanoon and Yarrunga Creeks into what is now known as the Kangaroo Valley. They then crossed the Shoalhaven River at Burrier and followed the Currambene Creek to Jervis Bay. They met many other Dharawal people along the way who helped in guiding and feeding them, including Timelong, Munnaana, Honney and Turong. Broughton then assisted in guiding the group on the return journey to Campbelltown.

Broughton also worked for John Oxley during the same period of time, guiding him around the Shoalhaven and Jervis Bay regions. Broughton took Oxley to the top of Nowra Hill and showed him the tomb of his deceased infant daughter.

== Associate of Alexander Berry ==
Broughton remained in the Sydney region where his portrait was sketched in 1819 by the visiting French artist, Jacques Arago. In 1822, Throsby recommended the services of Broughton to the colonist Alexander Berry who was looking to create a large landholding at the Shoalhaven River. This was the homeland of Broughton who subsequently readily accepted the position.

Broughton became a very important intermediary for Berry, acting as a guide, interpreter and conciliator for the colonist. Through Broughton and another Dharawal man named Nambré (aka Charcoal), Berry was able to open up communication with important members of the local Shoalhaven clans right from his initial arrival to colonise the area. This minimised the frontier violence and enabled Broughton to achieve a better outcome for his people while their land was being taken away from them.

Broughton also assisted Berry by delivering messages to Sydney, recruiting Aboriginal workers and assisting in the construction of Berry's immense Coolangatta Estate on the Shoalhaven. Broughton was also utilised as a tracker, especially in the recapturing of escaped convict workers on the estate. In 1822, Berry awarded Broughton a brass breastplate with the inscription of “Broughton: Native Constable of Shoalhaven”.

In 1829, Broughton was tasked to pursue his brother, a man named Broger, who was wanted for the killing of sawyer near Boon-ga-ree. Broughton avoided tracking down his brother, but Broger was later captured and hanged at Campbelltown.

== Marriages ==
Broughton had three wives — two concurrently — and at least four children.

One of his first two wives, Charlotte, died from a beating he gave her.

His wives also had sexual relations with the white workers resulting in mixed race step-children. An 8-year-old daughter of his was raped by convicts. Some of his descendants took the name William Broughton or Billy Broughton.

== Later life, death and legacy ==
Broughton became less useful to Berry as time went by and he himself avoided work, as it made him appear to his relatives like a lowly convict worker. He remained mostly in his homeland around the Coolangatta Estate, occasionally collecting rations from the homestead.

Broughton died around 1850.

Alexander Berry viewed Broughton as a dependable friend and named various localities in the Shoalhaven after him, including Broughton Creek, Broughton, Broughton's Head, Broughton Vale and Broughton Village. The township of Berry was initially called Broughton Creek after him before the name was changed in 1889.

== See also ==
- List of Indigenous Australian historical figures
- Broger
