= Bundewallah =

- Town
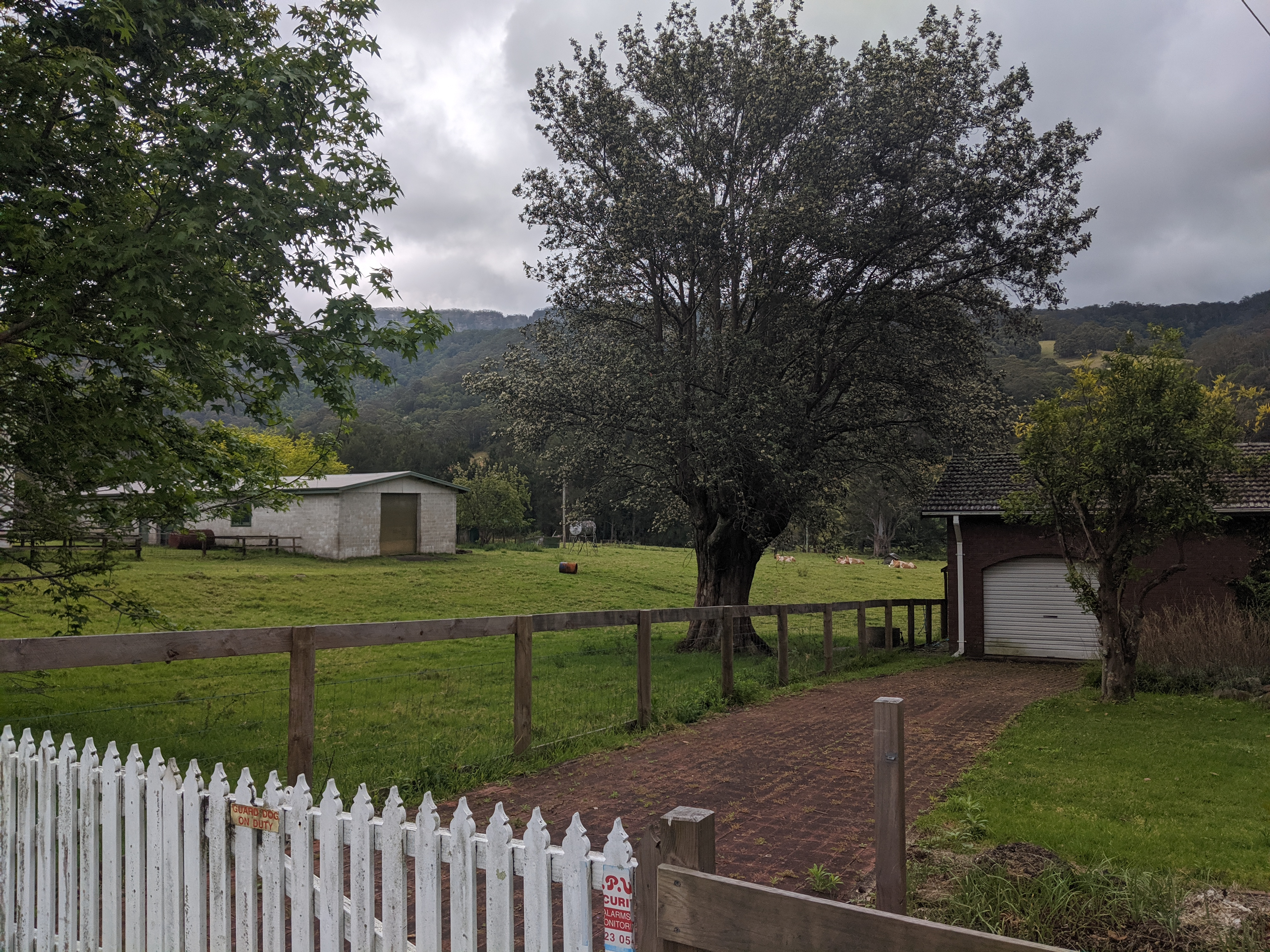

- Coordinates: 34°45′05″S 150°39′54″E
- Country: Australia
- State: New South Wales
- Region: South Coast
- LGA: City of Shoalhaven
- Location: 155 km (96 mi) S of Sydney; 21 km (13 mi) N of Nowra; 27 km (17 mi) SW of Kiama

Government
  - State electorate: Kiama
  - Federal division: Gilmore
- Elevation: 82 m (269 ft)

Population
  - Total: 48 (2016 census)
- Postcode: 2535
- County: Camden
- Parish: Broughton
Localities around Bundewallah
Wattamolla	Woodhill	Woodhill
Bellawongarah	Bundewallah	Broughton Vale
Berry Mountain	Berry	Berry

Bundewallah is a locality in the City of Shoalhaven in New South Wales, Australia. It lies to the north of the Kangaroo Valley Road to the northwest of Berry. At the 2016 census, it had a population of 48.
