= Fishermans Paradise =

Fishermans Paradise may refer to the following places:

- Fishermans Paradise, New South Wales, Australia, town in the South Coast Region
- Fishermans Paradise, Pennsylvania, USA, fishing site in Centre County
