= Wattamolla, New South Wales =

Wattamolla
- Town
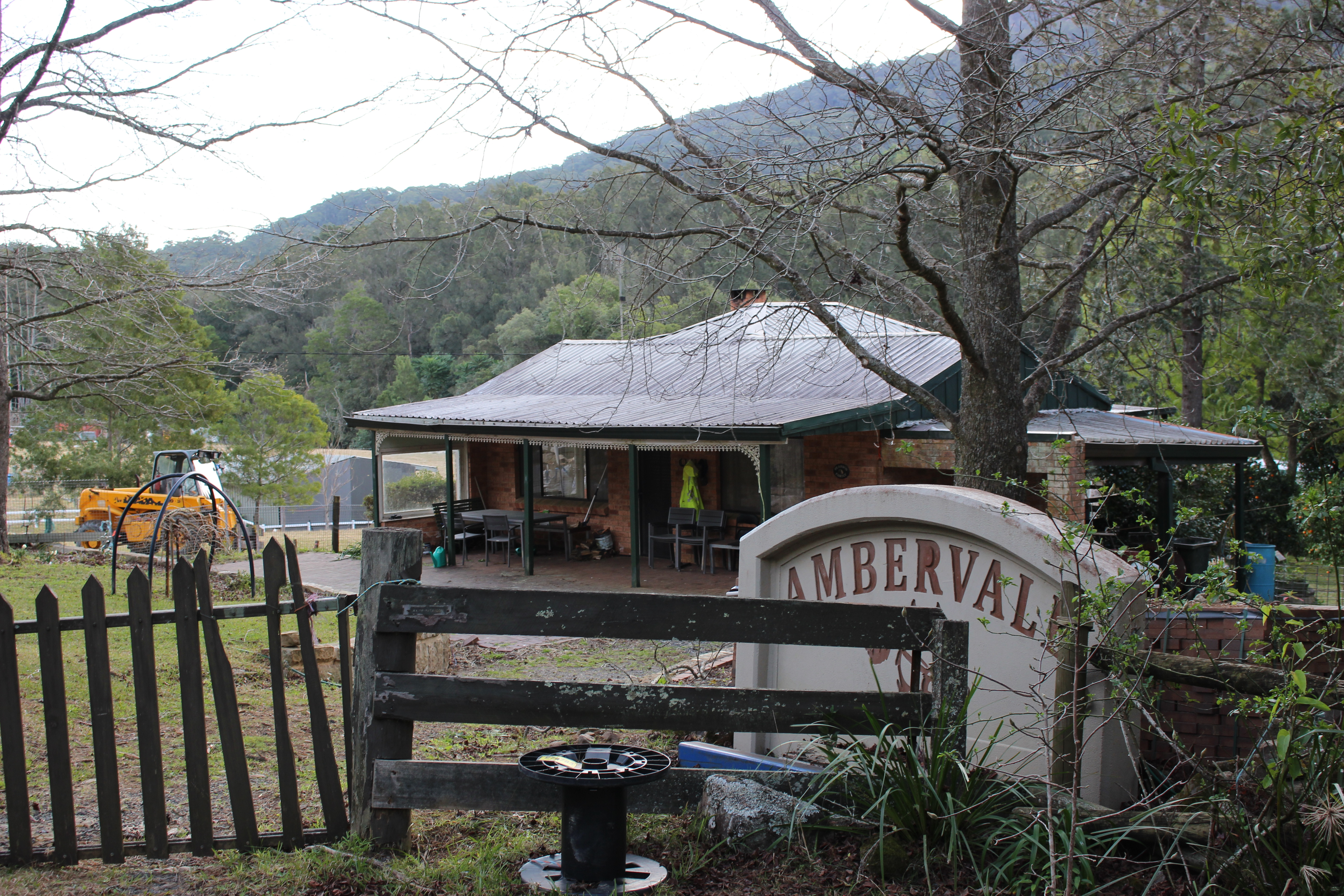

- Coordinates: 34°43′32″S 150°37′54″E
- Country: Australia
- State: New South Wales
- Region: South Coast
- LGA: City of Shoalhaven
- Location: 163 km (101 mi) S of Sydney; 13 km (8.1 mi) NW of Berry; 16 km (9.9 mi) E of Kangaroo Valley; 36 km (22 mi) WSW of Kiama

Government
  - State electorate: Kiama
  - Federal division: Gilmore
- Elevation: 139 m (456 ft)

Population
  - Total: 61 (2016 census)
- Postcode: 2535
- County: Camden
- Parish: Cambewarra
Localities around Wattamolla
Upper Kangaroo River	Budderoo	Barren Grounds
Kangaroo Valley	Wattamolla	Woodhill
Beaumont	Bellawongarah	Berry Mountain

Wattamolla is a locality in the City of Shoalhaven in New South Wales, Australia. It lies in the valley of Brogers Creek about 16 km east of Kangaroo Valley. At the 2016 census, it had a population of 61.
