= Woodhill, New South Wales =

Woodhill
- Town
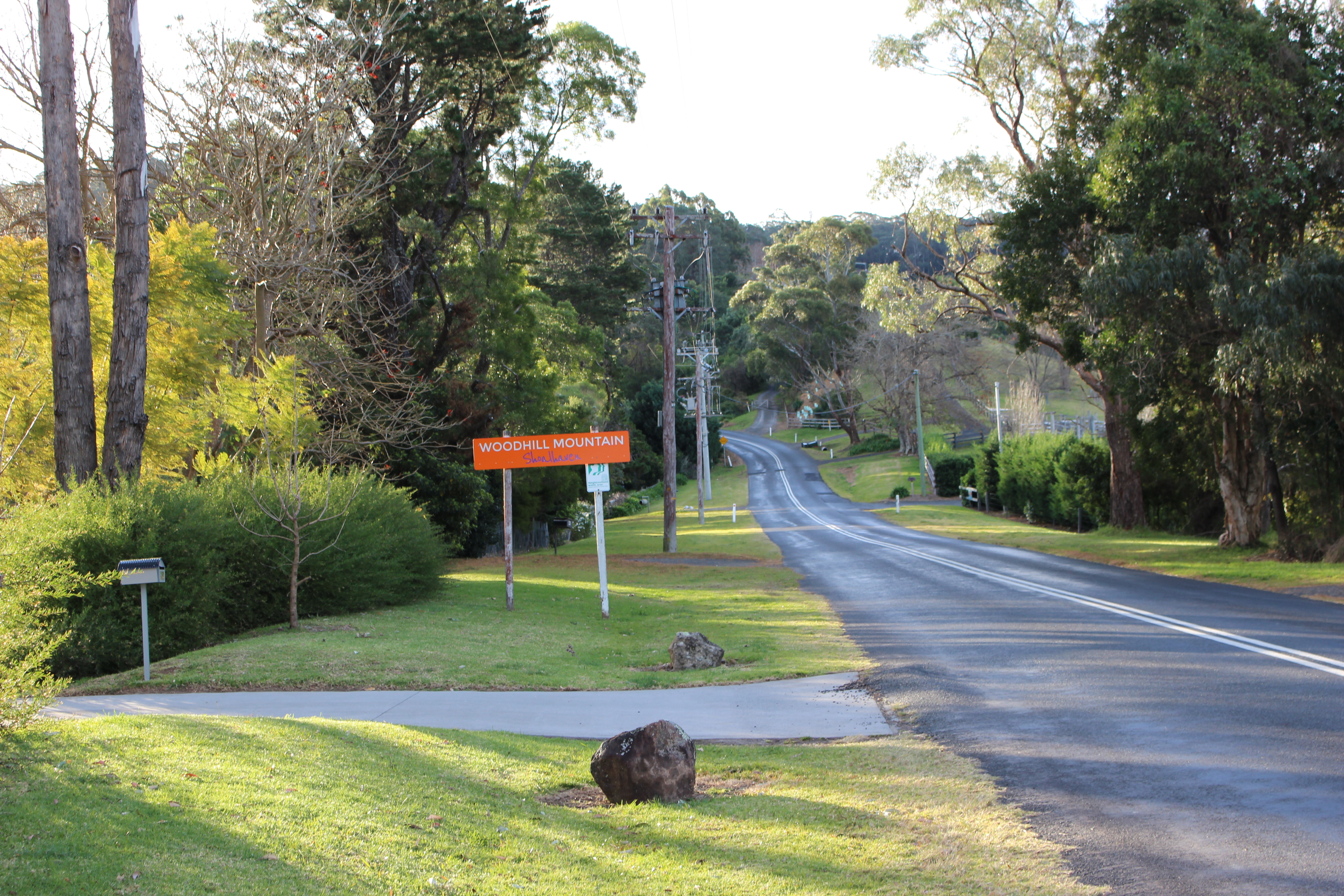

- Coordinates: 34°43′57″S 150°41′02″E
- Country: Australia
- State: New South Wales
- Region: South Coast
- LGA: City of Shoalhaven
- Location: 160 km (99 mi) S of Sydney; 28 km (17 mi) N of Nowra; 10 km (6.2 mi) NW of Berry; 31 km (19 mi) WSW of Kiama

Government
  - State electorate: Kiama
  - Federal division: Gilmore
- Elevation: 327 m (1,073 ft)

Population
  - Total: 72 (2016 census)
- Postcode: 2535
- County: Camden
- Parish: Broughton
Localities around Woodhill
Wattamolla	Brogers Creek	Barren Grounds
Wattamolla	Woodhill	Broughton Vale
Bellawongarah	Bundewallah	Broughton Vale

Woodhill is a locality in the City of Shoalhaven in New South Wales, Australia. It lies in the hills about 10 km northwest of Berry. It is home to the Rodway Nature Reserve, a 83ha park created in May 1970 and managed by the NSW National Parks and Wildlife Service.

== Demographics ==
At the 2016 census, it had a population of 72. 45.6% of the population was male, and 54.4% was female. The median age of residents was 62.
