= Hampden Bridge =

Hampden Bridge is the name of two historic bridges in New South Wales, Australia, named after Lord Hampden, who was Governor of New South Wales from 1895 to 1899.

== Historic bridges ==
- Hampden Bridge, Wagga Wagga, was a wooden Allan Truss bridge built in 1895 located in Wagga Wagga, New South Wales
- Hampden Bridge, Kangaroo Valley, is a sandstone bridge built in 1897 located in Kangaroo Valley, New South Wales
