= Hampden Bridge, Kangaroo Valley =

Bridge in New South Wales, Australia

Hampden Bridge
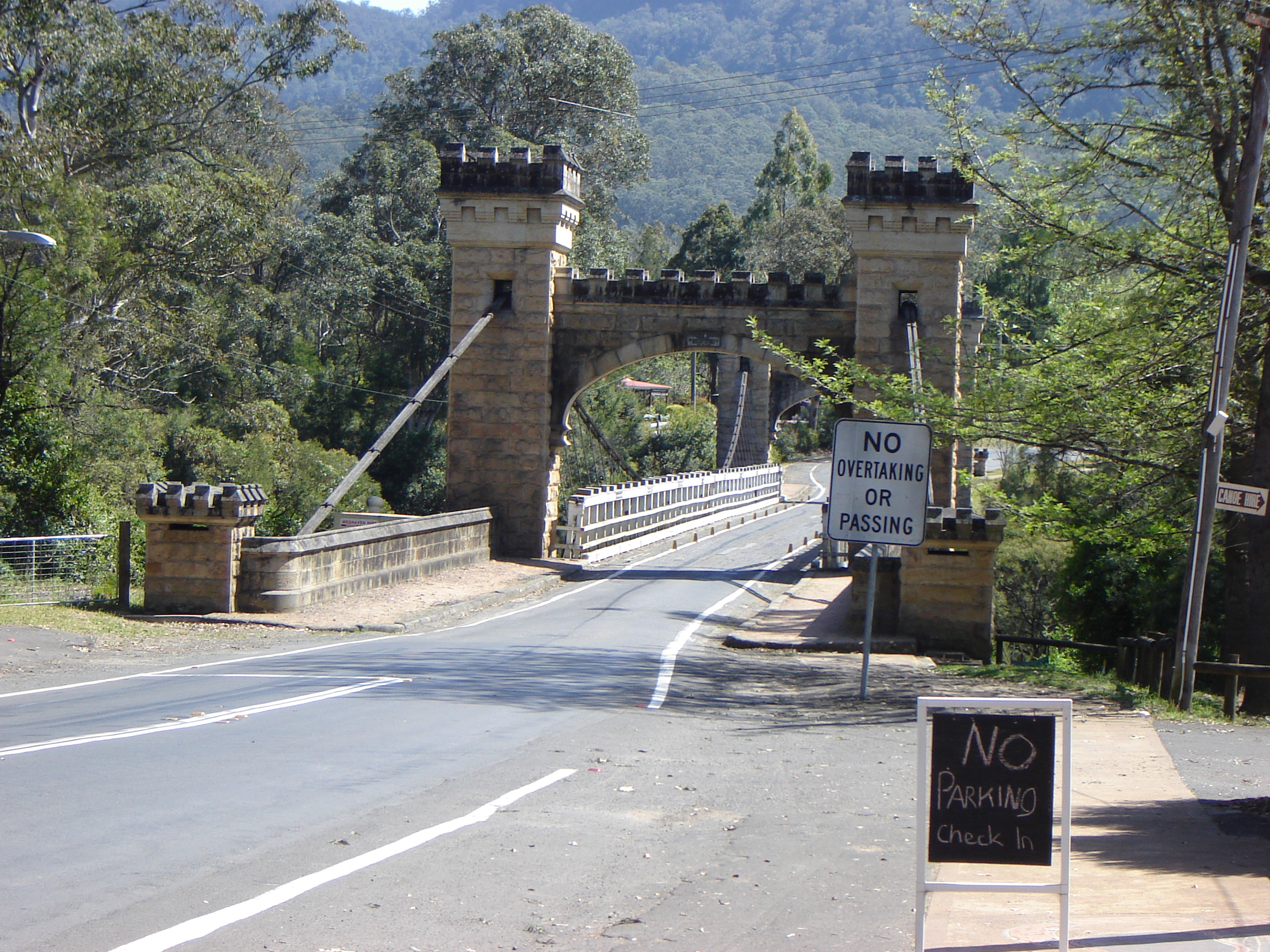
- Hampden Bridge, pictured in 2008
- Coordinates: 34°43′40″S 150°31′16″E
- Carries: Moss Vale Road (B73)
- Crosses: Kangaroo River
- Locale: Kangaroo Valley, City of Shoalhaven, New South Wales, Australia
- Other name: RTA Bridge No.875
- Named for: Henry Robert Brand, 2nd Viscount Hampden
- Owner: Transport for NSW
- Website: visitkangaroovalley.com.au/hampden-bridge

Characteristics
- Design: Suspension bridge
- Material: Steel cables
- Trough construction: Timber deck
- Pier construction: Crenellated sandstone turrets
- Total length: 77 metres (252 ft)
- Width: 5 metres (18 ft)
- No. of spans: 1

History
- Architect: Ernest de Burgh
- Constructed by: Loveridge and Hudson
- Construction start: 1895
- Construction cost: A£8,000
- Opened: 19 May 1898; 128 years ago
- Inaugurated: by James Henry Young
- Replaces: 2-span timber truss bridge, 1879

New South Wales Heritage Register
- Official name: Hampden Bridge
- Type: State heritage (built)
- Designated: 2 August 2019
- Reference no.: 2024
- Type: Road Bridge
- Category: Transport - Land
- Builders: Loveridge and Hudson

Location
- Interactive map of Hampden Bridge

Hampden Bridge is a heritage-listed single-span suspension bridge that carries Moss Vale Road (B73) across the Kangaroo River, in Kangaroo Valley, in the City of Shoalhaven local government area of New South Wales, Australia. The bridge was designed by Ernest de Burgh and built by Loveridge and Hudson. The property is owned by Transport for NSW. It was added to the New South Wales State Heritage Register on 2 August 2019.

Opened on 19 May 1898, the bridge is named in honour of Lord Hampden, the governor of New South Wales from 1895 to 1899.

== History ==
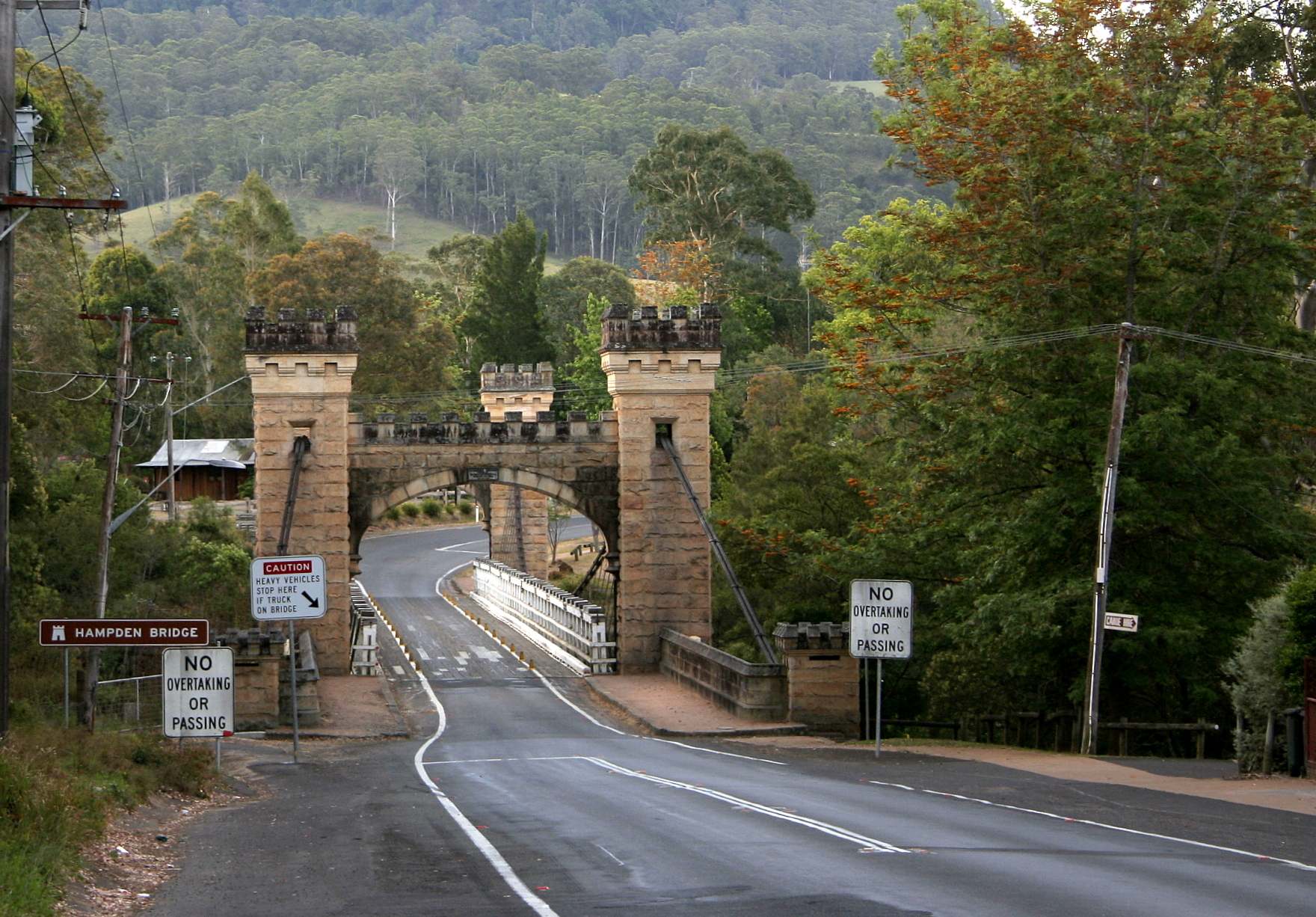
Hampden Bridge in Kangaroo Valley

Hampden Bridge was designed by Ernest Macartney de Burgh, the colony's assistant engineer for bridges, to replace the decaying timber truss bridge which originally spanned the Kangaroo River. The bridge was opened on 19 May 1898, just six days before floods washed the old bridge away. Construction was by Thomas Loveridge and Herbert Hudson and began in 1895. At the conclusion they formed a partnership, Loveridge and Hudson.

A public holiday was declared in Kangaroo Valley for the bridge opening. The bridge was opened by the Minister for Public Works, J. H. Young.

=== History of Kangaroo Valley ===
Kangaroo Valley region is within the Dharawal/Thurawal clan country, a language group extending generally from the "Cowpastures" (Camden/Appin) east along Georges River then to the south of Jervis Bay and west to Braidwood. The Wodi Wodi and Wandrawandian, Dharawal sub groups from the Illawarra-Shoalhaven area accessed the valley year round. Local Dharawal names are still used such as "Noggarah", a big gully and "Parronrah", suitable camping areas on the river side flats. Kangaroos and other wildlife abounded and the valley was considered a refuge or game reserve, sometimes used as a meeting place for the various family groups to replenish on their journey to the "Cowpastures" around the Camden/Appin area, where larger gatherings took place with neighbouring clans such as the Gundungurra from the Blue Mountains, to trade and conduct ceremony. Quite often disputes were also addressed through a formal process.

The arrival of the cedar getters and cattlemen in the 1800s changed the Aboriginal way of life and eventually only two family groups were recorded as living in the valley; at Trimbles Creek, north end of the valley and along the river on the southern side of the main village. By the early 1900s these remaining family groups were displaced from their lands and relocated with their remaining family groups clustered along the Illawarra/Shoalhaven coast, in places such as the (former) government reserves at Coomaditchee, Roseby Park and Wreck Bay.

Despite the displacement of the Aboriginal people from the land, the Aboriginal culture of this valley is still present in the numerous traditional campsites by stone artefact scatters along the "Parronrah" and axe-grinding grooves at Barrengarry. It is also present in places such as rock art sites in the sandstone overhangs along the "Noggarah" that feed into the main river, in the stories and song lines describing the connections Aborigines o countrthe y, and moas well as acontinongoing u of talepractices Abohe region's inal people of theg

European settlement of the valley began in the late 1810s, with Richard Brooks sending cattle into the valley from the already settled districts of Berrima and Sutton Forest in 1817 and then taking up a grant in the valley in 1820. Others moved into the valley from Sutton Forest to occupy land around Brogers Creek. Cedar- getting also commenced in the first half of this century, with Kangaroo Valley known for its red cedar. Kangaroo Valley was surveyed by Hoddle in 1831. Several areas were selected for cattle stations in the 1830s, but the 1841 census showed only seven men inhabiting the valley.

Charles Throsby had passed through Kangaroo Valley in 1818 in search of a route from the coast to the settled districts along the Great South Road (Hume Highway). Throsby's route may have laid the line for the Cambewarra Road. The Cambewarra Road remained an important connection between the more closely settled districts to the north-west, with road access to Parramatta and Sydney, and the south coast. With access from Sydney to Wollongong still difficult into the early twentieth century, travelling to the south coast via the Cambewarra Road, remained a popular way (and still is today) to reach the south coast.

Henry Osborne, an Irish settler was a prominent landholder in the valley as well at other locations across the state and in 1837 held over 4000 acres. Charles McCaffrey, one of a group of settlers from Fermanagh, Ireland, brought dairy farming into the Kiama-Shoalhaven region, settling at Barrengarry in 1846. He soon began a dairy and butter production. Once Kangaroo Valley was opened to free settlement, the population grew from 200 in 1861, to 1,400 in 1881 as dairy farmers flocked to the valley. The region developed to become the Colony's major butter producer. However, travelling out of the region to the coast and Southern Highlands was still restricted by having to cross a ford over the Kangaroo River.

As the local farming activities reached a peak in the 1870s, it was decided to construct a two span timber truss bridge over the Kangaroo River of the "Old Public Works Department" (Old PWD) design. The call for tenders was advertised in the Government Gazette 21 August 1874, p. 2531. The awarding of the contract to build the bridge for A£3,000 to the Braidwood-based company, Kelly and Walsh was advertised in the Government Gazette 11 September 1876 p. 3608. According to Clark (1998) there were many unforeseen difficulties encountered during construction which resulted in the shifting of the site of the bridge to help with bridge construction. The bridge which was named the Kangaroo Valley Bridge was opened on 14 August 1879 by Thomas Garrett, MP. The new bridge significantly improved access for the residents of the Valley, supported the five butter factories, the main township which had now gained a school, Post Office, churches and hotel and the nearby village of Barrengarry.

Although this timber truss bridge was constructed to be a "permanent" structure, it was soon discovered that the bridge's condition was deteriorating. In 1893 two large girders and wire rope were placed under the structure for additional strength. At the same time, planning began for the replacement of the bridge with a new suspension bridge which was to become far-famed as "the greatest feat of engineering in the valley and the second greatest in the colony of New South Wales".

Farm amalgamations in the twentieth century have reduced the population greatly, and hobby farmers and retirees are increasingly attracted to the valley. Otherwise, the character of the township has not changed significantly in the last 130 years with a number of heritage buildings remaining. The valley is now a popular tourist destination with a range of accommodation choices available, including bed and breakfasts. The bridge forms an important landmark and an attraction, as well as to this day being still the main access across the Kangaroo River. The bridge is well known to those who reside in the valley, and to the wider public of Sydney and the South Coast region.

=== History of early bridges constructed in NSW ===
The first bridge constructed in NSW was built in 1788. The bridge was a simple timber bridge constructed over the Tank Stream, near what is today the intersection of Pitt and Bridge Streets in the Sydney central business district. Soon after its construction, it was washed away and needed to be replaced. The first "permanent" bridge in NSW was the first bridge's successor. This was a stone arch bridge with a span of 7 metres (24 ft) erected in 1803. However this was not a triumph of colonial bridge engineering, as it collapsed after only three years of service. It took a further five years for the bridge to be rebuilt in an improved form. Prior to the arrival of David Lennox in the Colony in 1832, NSW was without expert knowledge in bridge design and construction. Lennox, who had worked with the famous bridge engineer Thomas Telford, became the Superintendent of Bridges for NSW in 1833.

During the first 60 years of the Colony, the majority of bridges were built from stone or timber, in the same manner as bridges being constructed in Britain and Europe. Stone was the bridge building material of choice in NSW, with construction costs kept low by the use of convict labour. However, with the cessation of convict transportation in the 1840s and subsequent rise in labour costs, bridge designers were forced to explore the use of other materials in bridge construction, leading to the eventual adoption of timber as the economical alternative. The size and quantity of readily available Australian hardwoods in the 1800s allowed the design and construction of efficient timber truss bridge designs reaching respectable spans.

=== History of suspension bridges in NSW ===
The history of the construction of suspension road bridges in NSW is rather limited compared to the more commonly built timber truss, steel, lift and concrete bridges that have been constructed in NSW since the 1800s. Suspension bridges have been more widely used as pedestrian bridges such as at river, creek and bay crossings (for example Hunter River, Moonan Flat and Parsley Bay, Vaucluse).

The first suspension road bridge constructed in NSW was at Long Gully, Northbridge in Sydney that was opened to traffic in 1892.

It was built as a timber deck suspension bridge with steel cables and ornate sandstone turreted towers by private developers to promote future residential development to the north. The original suspension bridge was constructed with a 152 metres (500 ft) main span that was supported by steel cables and hanger rods. The deck was stiffened by an undertruss which was pin connected at the centre of the span. The steel cables were supported on sandstone towers and anchored into bedrock at each end of the gorge. The wooden deck contained two traffic lanes plus two tram tracks and pedestrian footways. Following taking ownership of Northbridge Bridge in 1935, the then Department of Main Roads carried out inspections of the bridge which revealed that significant corrosion was occurring in the steelwork and cables. It was decided to replace the suspension bridge with a reinforced concrete arch with the original sandstone towers retained. The bridge was re-opened to traffic in 1939.

Hampden Bridge at Kangaroo Valley was the second suspension bridge to be built in NSW and is now the only surviving suspension road bridge from the Nineteenth Century. It replaced a previous timber truss bridge built in 1879. The new bridge was designed by Ernest Macartney De Burgh. It is noteworthy that De Burgh, in 1894 designed a suspension pedestrian bridge at the village of Tuena, NSW. Whilst this bridge was of a differing design, it is likely that De Burgh had incorporated some of design calculations into the development of the design of Hampden Bridge. Hampden Bridge was opened in 1898.

=== History of the Hampden Bridge ===
Design and construction

Design for the new suspension bridge to replace the deteriorating timber bridge began when the Department of Public Works Engineer, Ernest de Burgh visited the site on 21 April 1895 to survey the site for the new bridge. De Burgh's design for the bridge included stone towers quarried on site to support steel cables, steel hangers and timber decking with two stiffening trusses formed by the timber and steel railing of the bridge. De Burgh in the design of the stiffening trusses adopted the same design he had used on 20 freestanding timber truss bridges that were built between 1900 and 1905, for example Landsdowne Bridge over Mulwaree Ponds.

An article titled A Magnificent Bridge - The New Structure over Kangaroo River appeared in The Kangaroo Valley Times in April 1896 announcing the imminent construction of the new bridge to be upstream of the previous bridge. The article also included a detailed description of the new bridge, including the following extract: "The new bridge is to be constructed on the suspension principle, the spans being supports of ends of cables being about 77 metres (253 ft). To carry the cables there will be erected on each side of the river a pair of towers of sandstone masonry, produced from the immediate vicinity of the bridge. The actual length of the bridge will be about 122 metres (400 ft) from pilaster to pilaster, and as the approaches measures about 161 metres (528 ft), the total length of bridge and approaches will be 283 metres (928 ft)."

The company Loveridge & Hudson were engaged as the builders for the new bridge. Loveridge & Hudson had previously worked on a number of significant projects in Sydney, including modifications to the Customs House at Circular Quay and the renowned High Victorian architectural style Great Synagogue, Elizabeth Street, Sydney.

The first milestone celebrated in the construction period was on 30 May 1896 when the keystone to the southern end pier was laid by Florence Comer whose family had a number of associations with the Kangaroo Valley region. The keystone to the northern end pier was then laid less than 4 months later on 3 September 1896 by Barrengarry businessman Israel Karnofsky.

Construction progressed into the second half of 1896 with the completion of one abutment, partial completion of the other abutment; all masonry work, parapets and excavations undertaken for the placement of the concrete thrust blocks. However, a significant setback was the erection of the wire cables. New wire cables had to be sought from London, UK as the previously acquired cables were not satisfactory. It was not until July 1897 that first of the wire cables could be installed on the bridge. Without any more major setbacks, the construction of the bridge was progressed leading to its opening to traffic in February 1898.

On 2 February 1898, the Hampden Bridge was declared open to traffic by valley resident John King who also opened the former timber truss bridge. Leading up to the official opening, a number of tasks were identified as part of the "clean up" including the removal of the old timber bridge. However, this was not required as on 12 February 1898, the largest flood since 1870 (18.5 metres (61 ft)) hit the region with a flood peak of 16.7 metres (55 ft) resulting in the bridge breaking up and being washed downstream. Importantly, the new bridge was constructed 2 metres (6 ft 7 in) higher than the previous bridge.

The official opening took place on 19 May 1898. The opening ceremony was performed by the Minister for Works, James Henry Young, MP before a crowd of 400 people. He was accompanied by Robert R. P. Hickson, Engineer-in-Chief and Ernest De Burgh, bridge designer. The Minister in his opening speech remarked that he "might go over the great Australian continent, and would find nothing equal of it". The bridge was named after Lord Hampden, Governor of New South Wales from 1895 to 1899. Total construction cost of the bridge was A£8,382.

In 1987 the bridge was declared as one of fifty most historic bridges in NSW.

== Description ==
A well-known local tourist attraction, Hampden Bridge carries Moss Vale Road (B73) across the Kangaroo River in the picturesque Kangaroo Valley, 120 kilometres (75 mi) southwest of Sydney. The bridge is located in an undulating river valley terrain, with a sheer sandstone face on its northern side and sandy inclined riverbank on the southern side. The river flows westward under the bridge. The bridge features four large Victorian Gothic Revival crenellated turrets made of locally quarried sandstone. This elaborate form, and the relatively sophisticated structural design of the span, reflect the importance of this river crossing at the time of construction: the Cambewarra Road (now the Moss Vale Road) was then a major route from Sydney to the south coast of NSW.

The deck is stiffened by timber side trusses which are hinged at midspan. The bridge, with a clear main span of 77 metres (253 ft), a sag in the cables of 15 metres (49 ft), sandstone tower height of 16.8 metres (55 ft) and height above water also of 16.8 metres (55 ft), is an impressive structure in the local landscape and has been a landmark icon of the region for more than 100 years. The bridge is a single lane for vehicular traffic, with two narrow pedestrian walkways; with a maximum truck load of 42.5 tonnes (46.8 short tons; 41.8 long tons), and no more than one truck on the bridge at a time.

Hampden Bridge is the only surviving suspension bridge from the colonial period in New South Wales; and is the oldest and only timber suspension bridge still carrying vehicular traffic still in operation within Australia.

In 2012 the bridge underwent a major A$3 million renovation by Roads & Maritime Services, after many years of lobbying by local resident Bruce Ramsay, who agitated for the preservation of this iconic structure.

=== Towers and abutments ===
The towers, constructed mainly from sandstone quarried on the site are of Victorian Gothic style, similar to the (former) suspension bridge at Northbridge in Sydney. Each tower has two columns, joined by an elliptically arched crossbeam above traffic height. As described by The Kangaroo Valley Times of April 1896, "These towers will be about 13 metres (42 ft) high, built on concrete blocks resting on the present sandstone formation, the masonry to towers being 1 square metre (8 sq ft). Each pair of towers will be connected by a wall containing an arched doorway 5 metres (18 ft) high, and as the top sides of the centre walls and heads of towers will be finished with battlement tops, the whole will present the appearance of a structure similar to the famous "Traitor's" gate of the Tower of London...".

In section, the towers are formed by a solid mass concrete core and finished with sandstone blocks. They sit on mass concrete which in turn was cast onto excavations to solid sandstone. Immediately below the roller saddle bearings supporting the cables, the mass concrete is surmounted by bedstones composed of the rarely found hard trachyte weighing 3 tonnes and quarried at Mount Gibraltar at Bowral. The cables enter the towers through openings close to the battlement height of the cross wall, and each tower is then topped with an enlarged battlement. The finish of the sandstone is a combination of smooth ashlar battlement details and rock-faced finish on the main column faces. The original design incorporated drainage gratings in the floor of the upper battlements.

Extending out from the base of each tower are sandstone parapet walls framing the approaches to the bridge. These are rubble filled, and topped with footpaths, kerbs and drainage grates on each side of the roadway. The parapet walls connect the towers to the cable anchorage structures. These consist of a shaft sunk some 25 ft into sound sandstone. At the bottom of each shaft is an enlarged chamber where riveted steel beams transfer the tensile forces from the cables to upthrust in the sandstone above. At the surface there are cast iron shoulder castings which turn the cables from inclined to vertical. The thrust forces from these are transferred into the sandstone bedrock via further 5 ton trachyte thrust blocks set in concrete. Each anchor pit is surmounted by a small crenelated turret, with an access cover adjacent. This allows access to the bottom of the pit via a full height access ladder.

One of the significant construction tasks was the excavation of drainage tunnels for the pit. On the Nowra side, the main drainage drive was some 30 metres (100 ft), opening to the northeast of the abutment, with a cross cut to the western pit. On the Moss Vale side the main drive was 18 metres (60 ft) long. These tunnels were excavated by drilling and blasting.

=== Suspension cables and anchorages ===
The main cables of the bridge on each side, consist of fourteen 36mm diameter steel wire ropes, each with a specified tensile strength of 79.6 tonnes (87.7 short tons; 78.3 long tons). The fourteen ropes are grouped into two cables of seven ropes each, and each rope consists of six strands, each having seven wires. They are anchored vertically in pits at either end of the bridge and have facility for length adjustment. Each rope has its own anchorage yoke around which it passes and is then fastened back to itself using six U-bolt clips. The fourteen yokes are connected by links and bolts to three anchorage girders using a pattern of 4-6-4, and these girders bear against the top of the anchorage pits.

From the anchorage, the ropes run upwards, over a shoulder casting which bears on the thrust block, leave the sandstone pilaster, run directly to the tower where they turn again on turning saddles which have roller bearings, and cross the span with a low point approximately one metre above deck level. In plan the cables angle inwards from the anchorage pits till they leave the towers, and then form a curve back to the tower on the far side of the bridge. This curve is created by the plane of the suspension hangers. The maintenance files on the bridge, describe that in 1970 the cables were coated with Davidsons X3016 Anticorrosive primer, BA77 Lumatint and Line 176 Black Finish.

=== Suspension hangers and cross girders ===
From the cables, suspension rods of varying length hang in an inclined plane at 2 metres (6 ft) centres to support the deck. Anchorage on the suspension cables is by way of suspension clips which have a U-bolt to support the eye at the top end of the hanger rods. They terminate through crossbeams which were originally timber, but are now boxes of galvanised steel formed by welding channel sections together. The hangers terminate with wedge-shaped washers, nuts and lock-nuts to allow adjustment of vertical profile.

Deck Sitting on the cross beams, the current deck consists of longitudinal timber stringers supporting transverse decking of timbers topped by longitudinal timber sheeting, with a bituminous seal. The stringers are of varying depth to provide a camber to the deck.

As part of that work and to compensate for the loss of lateral and torsional stiffness of the new deck, a steel undertruss was installed. This connected to the abutment at each end and, by so doing, changed the manner in which the bridge was designed to articulate. It has since had a history of connection failures. Packed above deck level to allow drainage, there is a timber kerb on each side giving a clearance of 5 metres (18 ft) between kerbs. In its current configuration, plastic flaps are fixed approx 1m in from each kerb to provide pedestrian access to the bridge, leaving approximately 3.5 metres (11 ft) carriageway for traffic.

=== Deck trusses ===
A suspension bridge is inherently a very flexible structure, with its vertical geometry (referred to as a funicular polygon which approximates a catenary shape which applies when the load on a cable is completely uniform) varying to balance the loads at each node. Stiffening of a minor nature is provided by the deck, but this is insufficient to prevent large vertical movements for heavy vehicles. To control this effect, this bridge is provided with stiffening trusses along each side of the deck. Each truss is pinned at the abutment and at the centre of the span. The truss form is of the Pratt truss configuration with timber top and bottom chords and timber verticals, with steel rod crossed diagonals. This configuration allows the truss to transfer loads from where it is applied in both directions to the elastic supports provided at each node by the suspension cables.

The top and bottom chords consist of pairs of horizontal timber whilst the verticals are single timbers. Splices in the chords have been affected with steel side plates, some of which may be original and some replaced. The original mild steel diagonal rods have been replaced with high strength steel rods (presumably grade 8.8 steel with an ultimate tensile strength of 800 MPa). These bear on galvanised steel thrust plates which are either original or similar to the original detail. To assist with durability, the chords and vertical tops have been capped with galvanised steel flashing.

Bearings and Centre Hinge The bottom chords of the side trusses terminate at mid-span at a pin joining the two truss halves, and at the abutments in bearings. The northern bearing and centre pin are of fixed pin type whilst the southern bearing is of a swing link style, detailed to allow longitudinal movement. This movement is a combination of thermal and geometric due to articulation of the suspension system. Materials used in the bearings and other ferric components include cast and wrought iron and also cast and wrought steel.

In addition, the bridge consists of a number of other features of a secondary nature. This includes lighting which illuminates the towers. These are in vandal resistant boxes mounted outside the approach parapets. Downpipes and drainage was installed to remove water ponding in 1974 works. Galvanised wire mesh grillesare provided to prevent bird access to the suspension cable saddle areas on each tower. Security grilles are provided to prevent entry to the anchor pit drainage tunnels. A mesh grille was added as a nut catcher at the end of each steel truss diagonal. A maintenance gantry is suspended from the underside of the bridge. The gantry is a lightweight steel truss structure supporting a personnel platform which can be skidded from the upstream to the downstreem side of the bridge. Utility pipes include a water main on the eastern side at the roadway level and two PVC conduits on the western side of the bridge.

A number of plaques and historical markers are present either on the bridge or in its vicinity.

=== Condition ===
As at 5 July 2018, the bridge and its various components are in a good condition due to regular maintenance and upkeep. The bridge is highly intact and retains a high degree of integrity.

=== Modifications ===
Adapted from the Hampden Bridge Conservation Management Plan:

- The bridge has undergone regular routine maintenance to preserve its operational use since its opening in 1898.
- 1938-42 – Major redecking works were undertaken.
- 1986 – Road accident on bridge caused damage to sandstone bridge structure resulting in partial demolition of eastern bridge approach.
- 2003 – RTA imposed a 42.5-tonne (46.8-short-ton; 41.8-long-ton) load limit in August 2003. 50-tonne (55-short-ton; 49-long-ton) or B-doubles would be prohibited.
- 2004 – The RTA was instructed to install a duplicate "Narrow Bridge" and "One Lane" warning sign on the Moss Vale side and to investigate road safety options on the approaches and monitor implementation of signage.
- 2005 – Signage approaching the bridge "no passing or overtaking".
- 2008/2009 – Some timber decking was replaced as required to keep the bridge safe.
- 2011 – Major works undertaken (To be confirmed)

== Heritage listing ==
As at 10 July 2018, Hampden Bridge is of state significance as the second major suspension bridge in NSW, and as the only surviving timber decked vehicular suspension bridge constructed in the nineteenth century (1898). The bridge is associated with engineer Ernest Macartney de Burgh, and builders Loveridge and Hudson. Hampden bridge has the capacity to represent some of the key characteristics of a small class of Australian suspension bridges, both vehicular and footbridges; many of which do not survive, or do not survive in their original form. The Hampden Bridge also has historic significance because it facilitated the agricultural prominence of the Kangaroo Valley area in the first decades of the twentieth century. The form of the bridge, its sophisticated structural design and elaborate tower castellations, reflects the cultural importance of this crossing at its time of construction, on what was then both a major route to the south of the state, and an area of emerging prosperity. The bridge now facilitates the growing importance of the area as a tourist destination. It is readily viewed and interpreted from the surrounding recreational areas and is held in high esteem by the local and wider community for its historic, aesthetic and technical qualities.

Hampden Bridge was listed on the New South Wales State Heritage Register on 2 August 2019 having satisfied the criteria.

== See also ==
- List of bridges in Australia
- Historic bridges of New South Wales
- Hampden Bridge (Wagga Wagga)
