= Far Meadow =

- Town
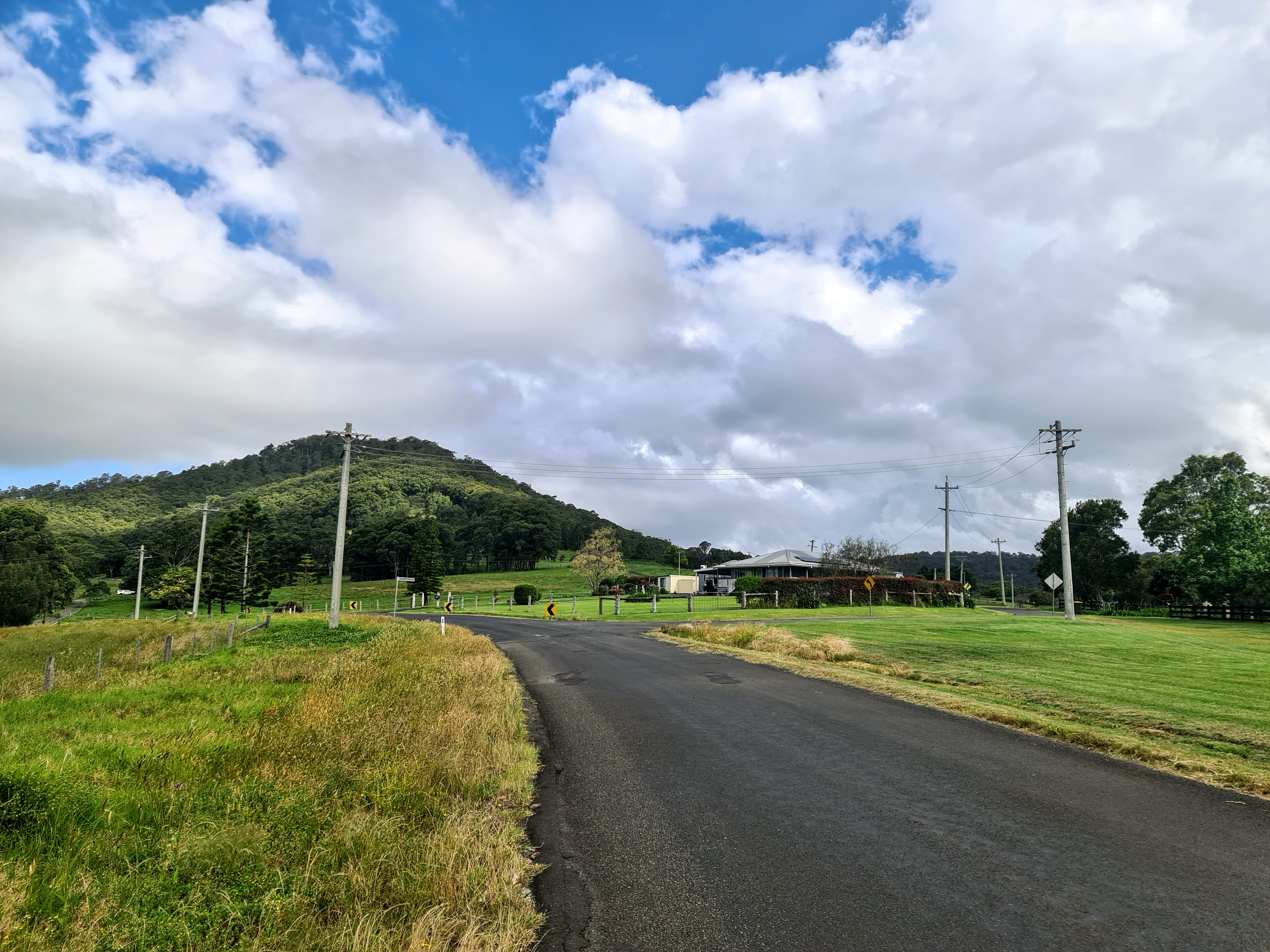
- Far Meadow

- Coordinates: 34°48′57″S 150°43′02″E
- Country: Australia
- State: New South Wales
- Region: South Coast
- LGA: City of Shoalhaven
- Location: 160 km (99 mi) S of Sydney; 18 km (11 mi) NE of Nowra; 30 km (19 mi) S of Kiama

Government
  - State electorate: Kiama
  - Federal division: Gilmore
- Elevation: 25 m (82 ft)

Population
  - Total: 209 (2021 census)
- Postcode: 2535
- County: Camden
- Parish: Coolangatta
Localities around Far Meadow
Berry	Berry	Berry
Jaspers Brush	Far Meadow	Coolangatta
Back Forest	Coolangatta	Coolangatta

Far Meadow is a locality in the City of Shoalhaven in New South Wales, Australia. It lies directly south of Coolangatta Road, and to the southeast of the town of Berry. At the 2021 census, it had a population of 209.

Far Meadow had a public school from June 1897 to December 1970.
