= Barrengarry, New South Wales =

Barrengarry New South Wales
- Coordinates: 34°41′S 150°31′E
- Population: 214 (2021 census)
- Postcode(s): 2577
- Elevation: 84 m (276 ft)
- Location: 153 km (95 mi) SW of Sydney; 29 km (18 mi) SE of Moss Vale; 29 km (18 mi) N of Nowra
- LGA(s): City of Shoalhaven
- Region: South Coast
- County: Camden
- Parish: Burrawang
- State electorate(s): Kiama
- Federal division(s): Gilmore
Localities around Barrengarry:
Fitzroy Falls	Wildes Meadow	Robertson
Kangaroo Valley	Barrengarry	Upper Kangaroo River
Kangaroo Valley	Kangaroo Valley	Kangaroo Valley

Barrengarry is a small village near the Southern Highlands of New South Wales, Australia, in City of Shoalhaven. It is situated north of Kangaroo Valley. At the 2021 census, it had a population of 214.

== History ==
The most important land acquisition in the area was the secondary land grant of 2560 acres issued to Henry Osborne in 1840. In 1876, a settlement known as the Private Township of Osborne was established, now known as Barrengarry in the north and Kangaroo Valley to the south.

The settlement at Barrengary developed as a satellite to the main township of Kangaroo Valley due to geography, distances and the fact that transport was completely reliant on horses or bullocks. The township developed its own Post Office, store, school and church between 1873 and 1874.

Barrengarry Public School was opened in 1874. The building was designed by celebrated architect Horbury Hunt.

Dairying was a main industry of the early Shoalhaven and with the invention of the cream separator in 1878, co-operative schemes between farmers became possible. Consequently, Barrengarry farmers came together at a meeting in August 1888 and resolved to build a butter factory. The factory was built a mile north of the Kangaroo River and commenced operations in February 1889.
