= Bolong, New South Wales =

Bolong
- Town
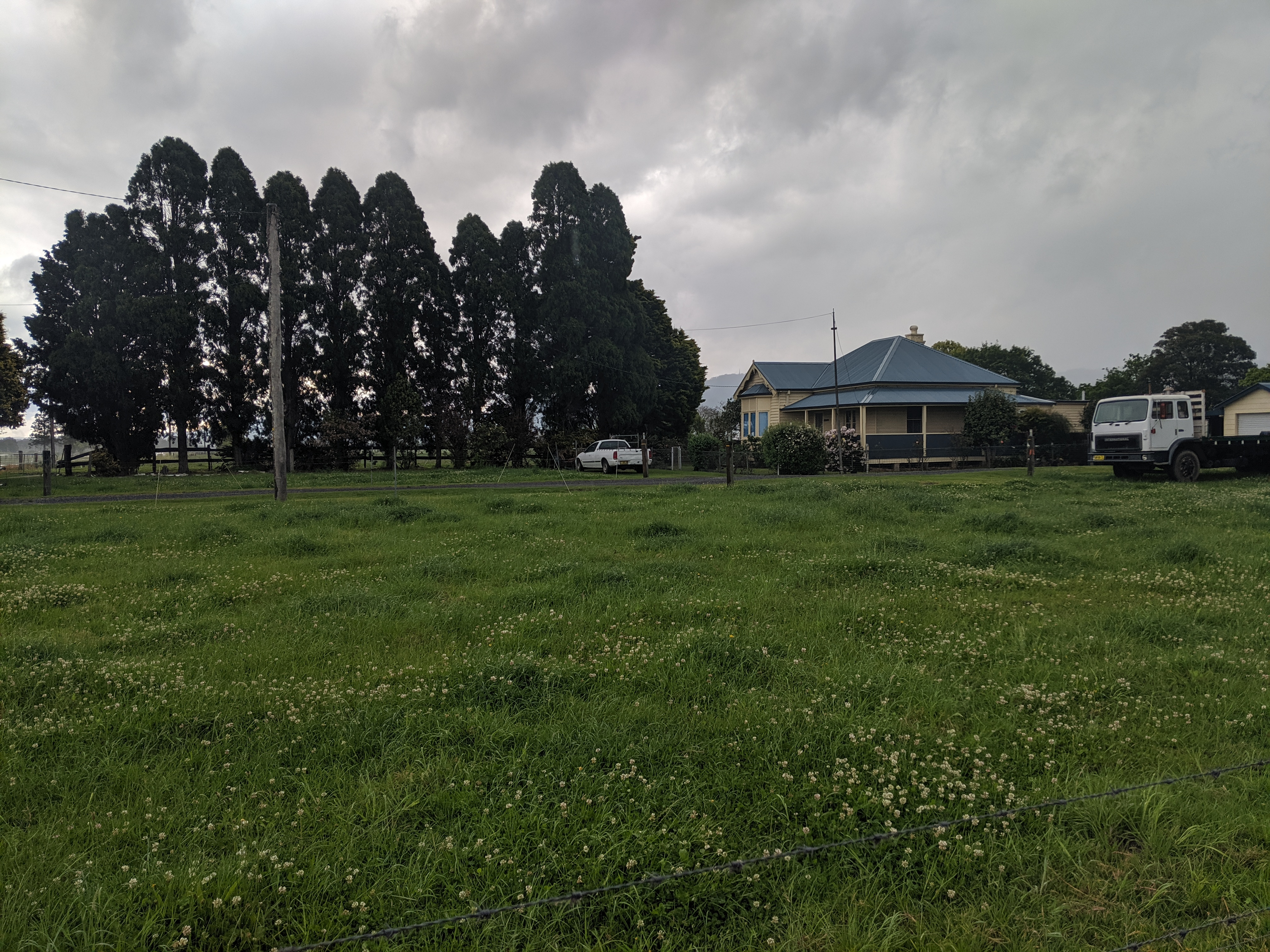

- Coordinates: 34°50′57″S 150°40′02″E
- Country: Australia
- State: New South Wales
- Region: South Coast
- LGA: City of Shoalhaven
- Location: 165 km (103 mi) S of Sydney; 10 km (6.2 mi) NE of Nowra; 13 km (8.1 mi) W of Shoalhaven Heads

Government
  - State electorate: Kiama
  - Federal division: Gilmore
- Elevation: 3 m (9.8 ft)

Population
  - Total: 104 (2016 census)
- Postcode: 2535
- County: Camden
- Parish: Coolangatta
Localities around Bolong
Meroo Meadow	Jaspers Brush	Back Forest
Bomaderry	Bolong	Back Forest
Nowra	Numbaa	Back Forest

Bolong is a locality in the City of Shoalhaven in New South Wales, Australia. It lies to the north of the Shoalhaven River and to the west of Broughton Creek. It is northeast of Nowra. At the 2016 census, it had a population of 104.

Bolong had a public school from November 1861 to December 1963, although it was called Boolong Public School until around 1900.
