= Jaspers Brush =

Jaspers Brush New South Wales
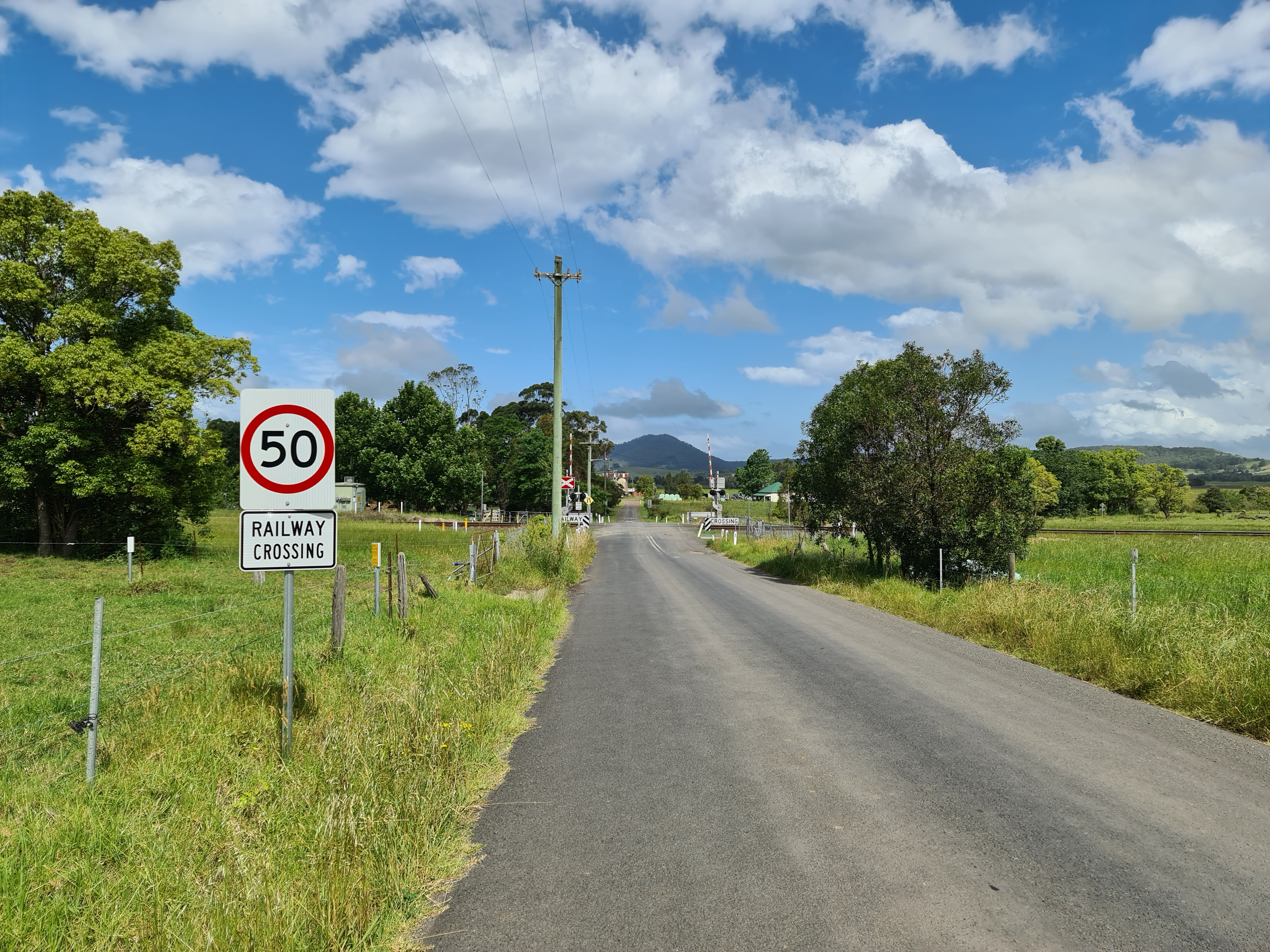

- Coordinates: 34°48′12″S 150°39′48″E
- Population: 362 (SAL 2021)
- Postcode(s): 2535
- Elevation: 11 m (36 ft)
- Location: 149 km (93 mi) S of Sydney; 28 km (17 mi) SW of Kiama; 14 km (9 mi) NE of Nowra
- LGA(s): City of Shoalhaven
- State electorate(s): Kiama
- Federal division(s): Gilmore
Localities around Jaspers Brush:
Bellawongarah	Berry Mountain	Berry
Beaumont	Jaspers Brush	Far Meadow
Meroo Meadow	Bolong	Back Forest

Jaspers Brush is a rural locality south of Berry, New South Wales in the City of Shoalhaven.

== History ==
It was named by John Ingold after his brother Jasper who died in 1869 before he could leave England for Australia.

== Railway ==
Jaspers Brush railway station on the South Coast Railway was opened 2 June 1893 and was closed 11 Dec 1951.
