= Berringer Lake =

- Town
- Coordinates: 35°14′59″S 150°30′19″E
- Country: Australia
- State: New South Wales
- LGA: City of Shoalhaven
- Location: 216.6 km (134.6 mi) NE of Sydney

Government
  - State electorate: South Coast
  - Federal division: Gilmore

Population
  - Total: 26 (2016 census)
- Postcode: 2539
- County: St Vincent
- Parish: Kioloa

Berringer Lake is a locality in New South Wales, Australia in the City of Shoalhaven.
