= Browns Mountain, New South Wales =

Rural locality and suburb in City of Shoalhaven

Browns Mountain is a suburb and locality in the City of Shoalhaven region. It has 14 scattered private residential dwellings.

== Demographics ==
The locality's population was 20 at the 2021 census.
