= Broughton Vale =

- Town
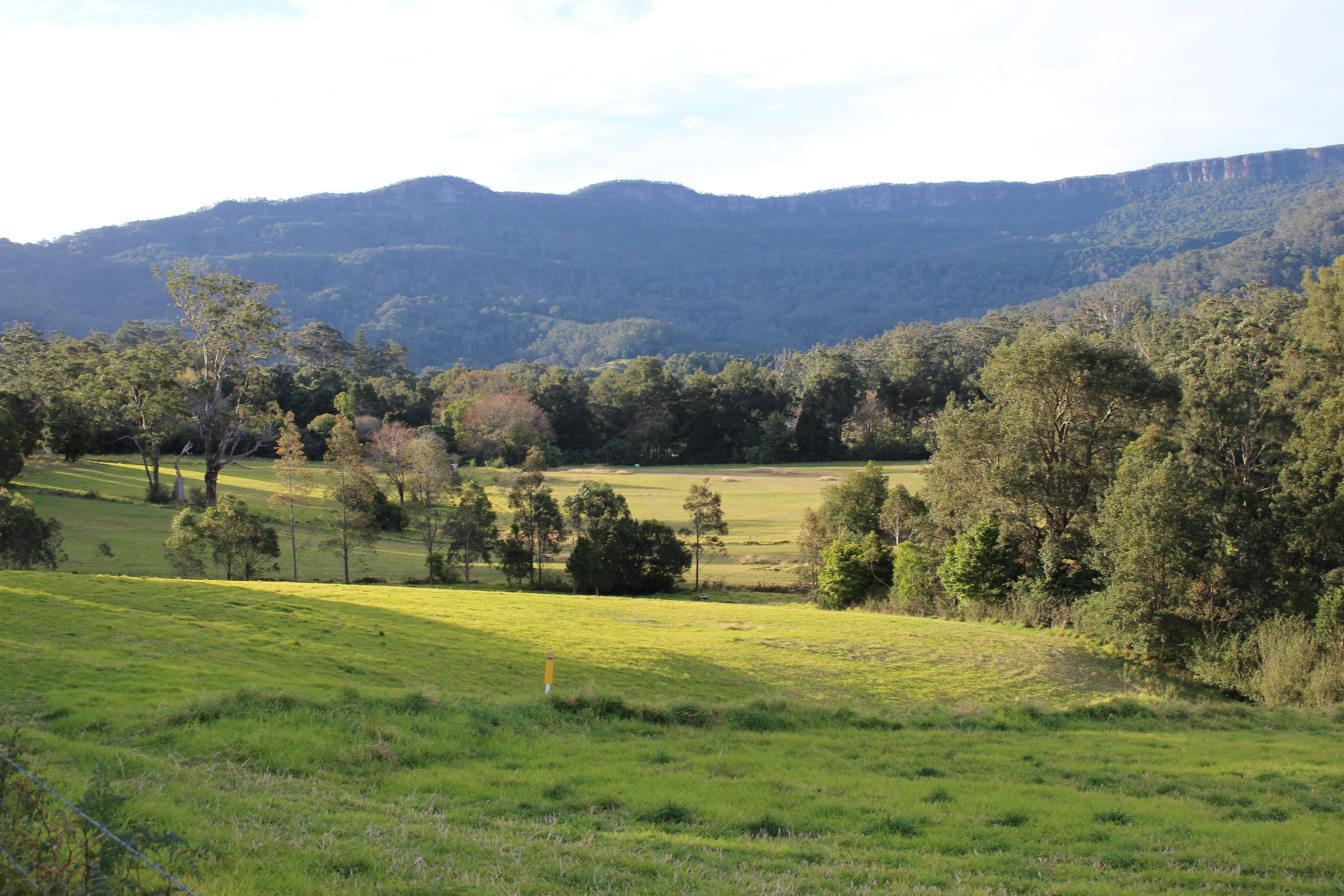
- Broughton Vale

- Coordinates: 34°43′57″S 150°43′02″E
- Country: Australia
- State: New South Wales
- Region: South Coast
- LGA: City of Shoalhaven
- Location: 156 km (97 mi) S of Sydney; 25 km (16 mi) NE of Nowra; 28 km (17 mi) SW of Kiama

Government
  - State electorate: Kiama
  - Federal division: Gilmore
- Elevation: 212 m (696 ft)

Population
  - Total: 180 (SAL 2021)
- Postcode: 2535
- County: Camden
- Parish: Broughton
Localities around Broughton Vale
Woodhill	Barren Grounds	Broughton Village
Bundewallah	Broughton Vale	Broughton
Berry	Berry	Berry

Broughton Vale is a locality in the City of Shoalhaven in New South Wales, Australia. It lies north of the Princes Highway at Berry between Nowra and Gerringong and on Broughton Mill creek. At the 2016 census, it had a population of 165. Broughton Vale is not to be confused with Broughton Village or Broughton, which both lie to its immediate east.

The locality is named after Broughton, a local Dharawal man who was employed as a guide and intermediary for the early British colonists.
