= Upper Kangaroo River =

- Town
- Coordinates: 34°42′36″S 150°34′49″E
- Country: Australia
- State: New South Wales
- Region: South Coast
- LGA: City of Shoalhaven
- Location: 164 km (102 mi) SW of Sydney; 44 km (27 mi) SE of Moss Vale; 35 km (22 mi) N of Nowra

Government
  - State electorate: Kiama
  - Federal division: Gilmore
- Elevation: 94 m (308 ft)

Population
  - Total: 151 (2021 census)
- Postcode: 2577
- County: Camden
- Parish: Wallaya
Localities around Upper Kangaroo River
Barrengarry	Upper Kangaroo Valley	Wattamolla
Barrengarry	Upper Kangaroo River	Wattamolla
Kangaroo Valley	Kangaroo Valley	Kangaroo Valley

Upper Kangaroo River is a small village in the Southern Highlands of New South Wales, Australia, in Shoalhaven City Council. It is located on the Kangaroo River, a tributary of the Shoalhaven River. At the 2021 census, it had a population of 151.

== Upper Kangaroo Valley ==
There is an area higher up the valley (34°38′45″S 150°36′51″E) in the Municipality of Kiama and the Wingecarribee Shire which has been officially defined as the locality of Upper Kangaroo Valley. At the 2021 census, it had no population.
