= Berry Mountain, New South Wales =

Berry Mountain
- Town
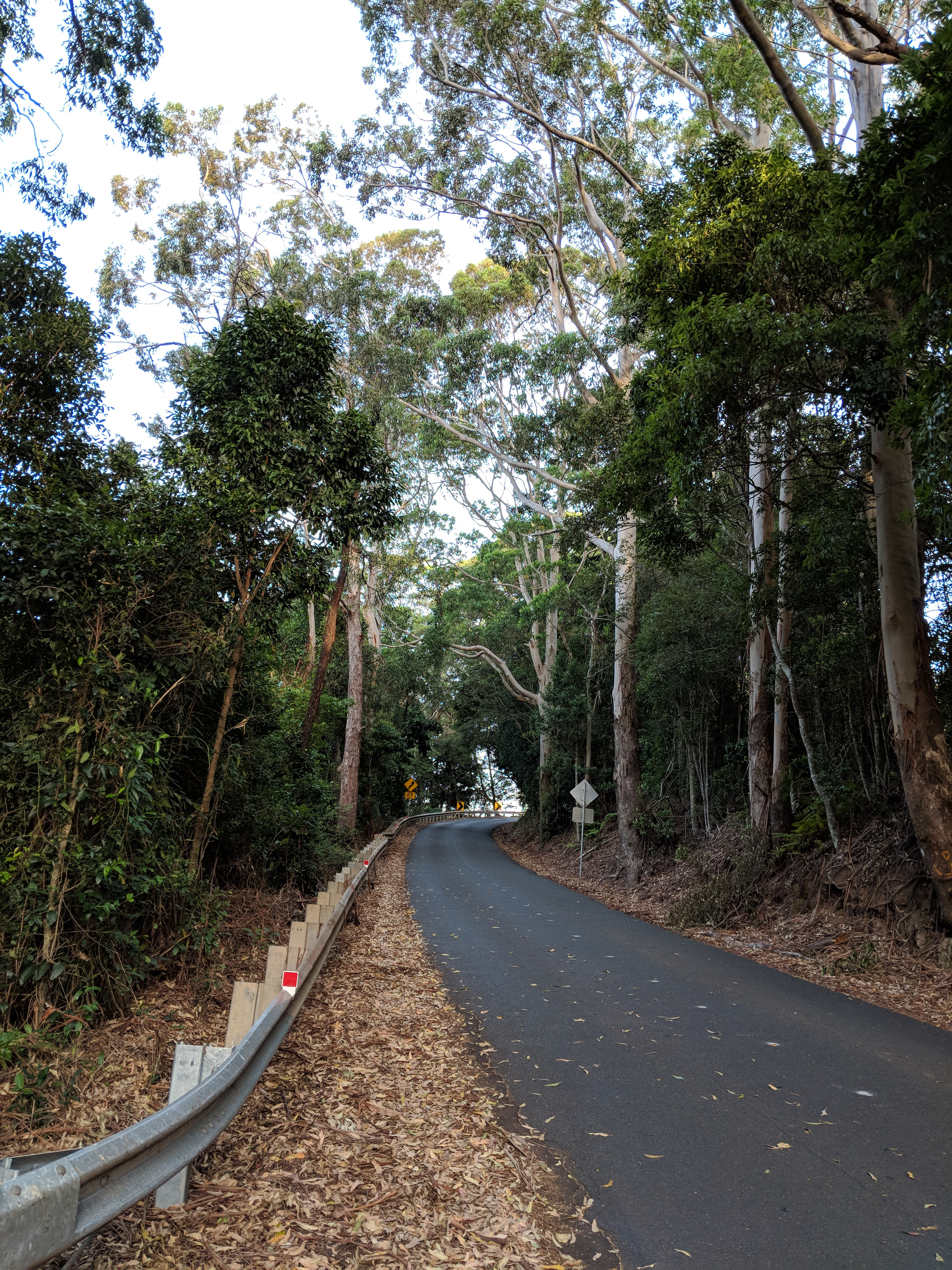
- Kangaroo Valley Road, Berry Mountain

- Coordinates: 34°45′57″S 150°39′02″E
- Country: Australia
- State: New South Wales
- Region: South Coast
- LGA: City of Shoalhaven
- Location: 153 km (95 mi) SSW of Sydney; 23 km (14 mi) N of Nowra; 28 km (17 mi) SW of Kiama; 111 km (69 mi) ENE of Goulburn

Government
  - State electorate: Kiama
  - Federal division: Gilmore
- Elevation: 387 m (1,270 ft)

Population
  - Total: 28 (2016 census)
- Postcode: 2535
- County: Camden
- Parish: Bunberra
Localities around Berry Mountain
Bellawongarah	Bundewallah	Bundewallah
Bellawongarah	Berry Mountain	Berry
Bellawongarah	Jaspers Brush	Berry

Berry Mountain is a locality in the City of Shoalhaven in New South Wales, Australia. It lies west of the Princes Highway on the Kangaroo Valley Road between Berry and Kangaroo Valley. It lies about 23 kilometre north of Nowra and about 160 km south of Sydney. At the 2016 census, it had a population of 28. It lies on a ridge and is partly covered by temperate rain forest and partly by grasslands that were formerly used for dairying, but are now mainly used for rural residences.
