= See Change Festival =

The See Change Festival is a biennial arts festival held in the Jervis Bay and St Georges Basin area, of the City of Shoalhaven, in late May and early June. The festival was first held in 2000. Festival events are themed around visual and performing arts, and literature, including photography, film, painting, sculpture, story writing, poetry and music. See Change is the sister festival of See Celebrations.
