= Back Forest, New South Wales =

Back Forest
- Town
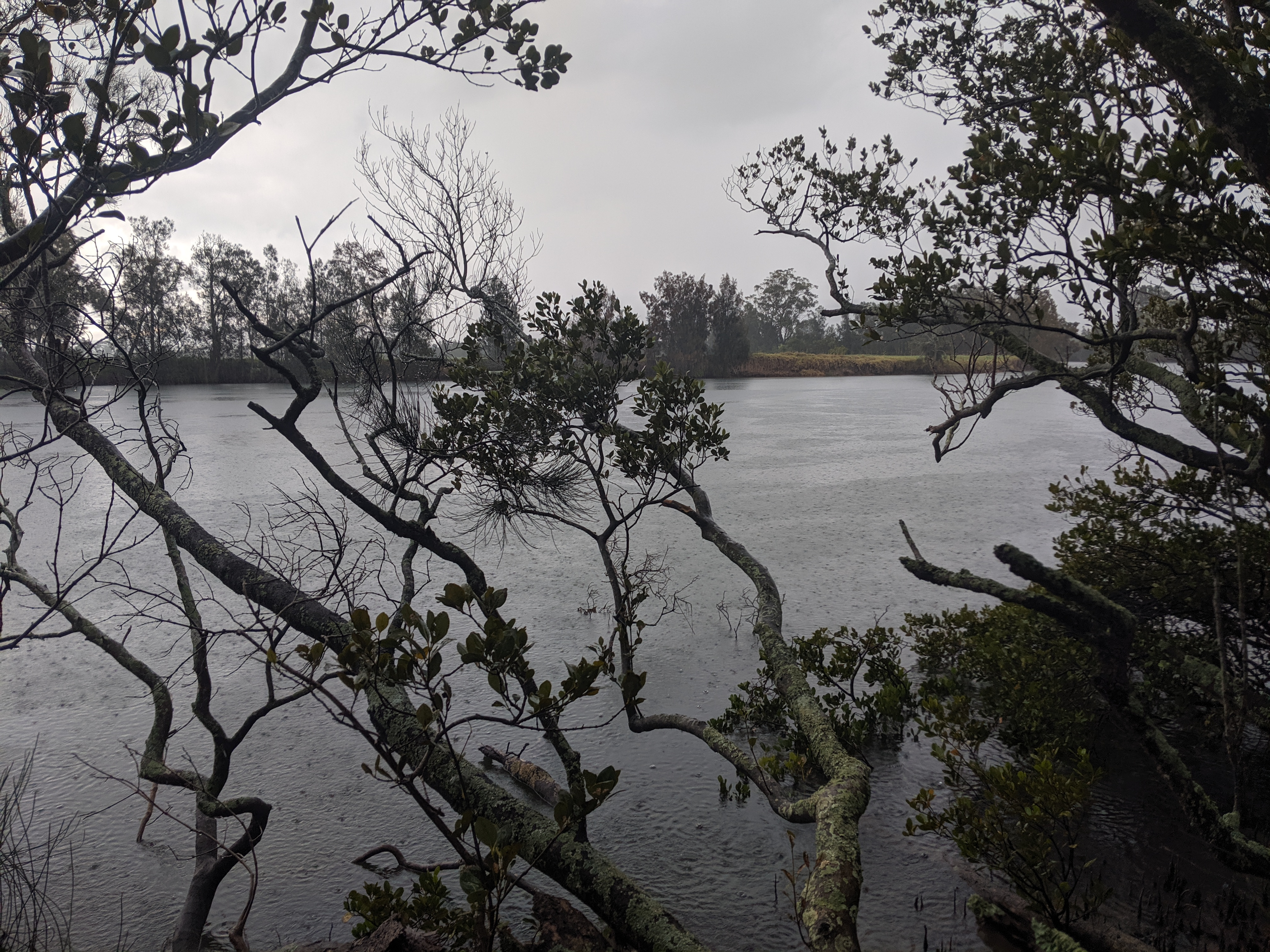
- Broughton Creek at Back Forest

- Coordinates: 34°50′57″S 150°41′02″E
- Country: Australia
- State: New South Wales
- Region: South Coast
- LGA: City of Shoalhaven
- Location: 160 km (99 mi) S of Sydney; 12 km (7.5 mi) NE of Nowra; 10 km (6.2 mi) W of Shoalhaven Heads

Government
  - State electorate: Kiama
  - Federal division: Gilmore
- Elevation: 4 m (13 ft)

Population
  - Total: 91 (2021 census)
- Postcode: 2535
- County: Camden
- Parish: Coolangatta
Localities around Back Forest
Jaspers Brush	Far Meadow	Far Meadow
Bolong	Back Forest	Coolangatta
Numbaa	Numbaa	Coolangatta

Back Forest is a locality in the City of Shoalhaven in New South Wales, Australia. It lies to the north of the Shoalhaven River and to the east of Broughton Creek. It is northeast of Nowra. At the 2021 census, it had a population of 91.
