= Broughton Village =

- Town
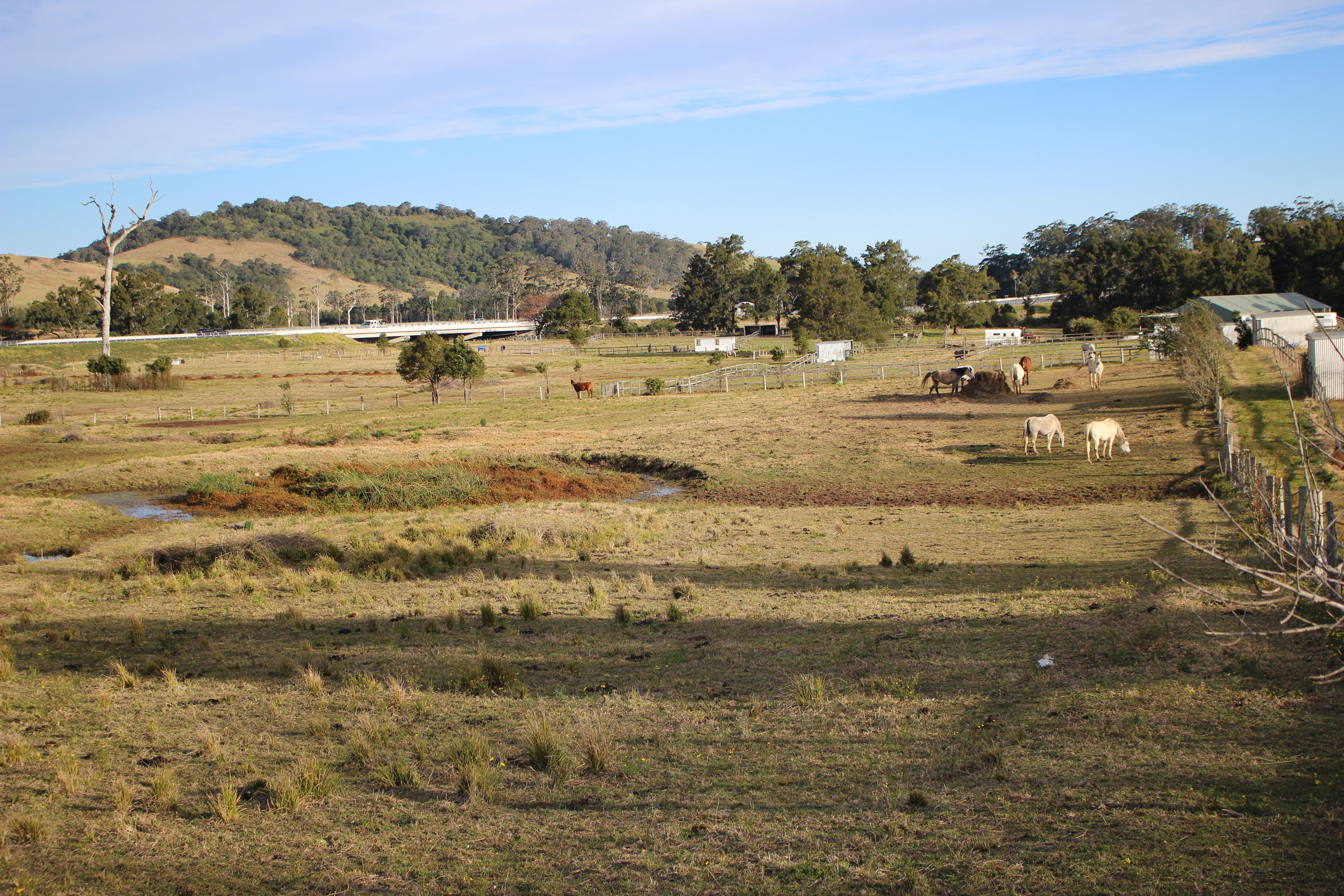
- Princes Highway at Broughton Village

- Coordinates: 34°44′47″S 150°45′08″E
- Country: Australia
- State: New South Wales
- Region: Illawarra
- LGAs: Municipality of Kiama; City of Shoalhaven
- Location: 146 km (91 mi) S of Sydney; 39 km (24 mi) NE of Nowra; 18 km (11 mi) SW of Kiama

Government
  - State electorate: Kiama
  - Federal division: Gilmore
- Elevation: 52 m (171 ft)

Population
  - Total: 95 (2021 census)
- Postcode: 2534
- County: Camden
- Parish: Broughton
Localities around Broughton Village
Barren Grounds	Foxground	Willow Vale
Broughton Vale	Broughton Village	Toolijooa
Broughton	Berry	Toolijooa

Broughton Village is a locality on the border of the Kiama and Shoalhaven local government areas in New South Wales, Australia. It lies on the Princes Highway about 18 km southwest of Kiama and 39 km north of Nowra and on Broughton Creek. At the 2021 census, it had a population of 95. Broughton Village is not to be confused with Broughton, a locality that lies to its immediate southwest or Broughton Vale, which lies to its immediate northwest.

The locality is named after Broughton, a local Dharawal man who was employed as a guide and intermediary for the early British colonists.
