= Broughton, New South Wales =

Broughton
- Town
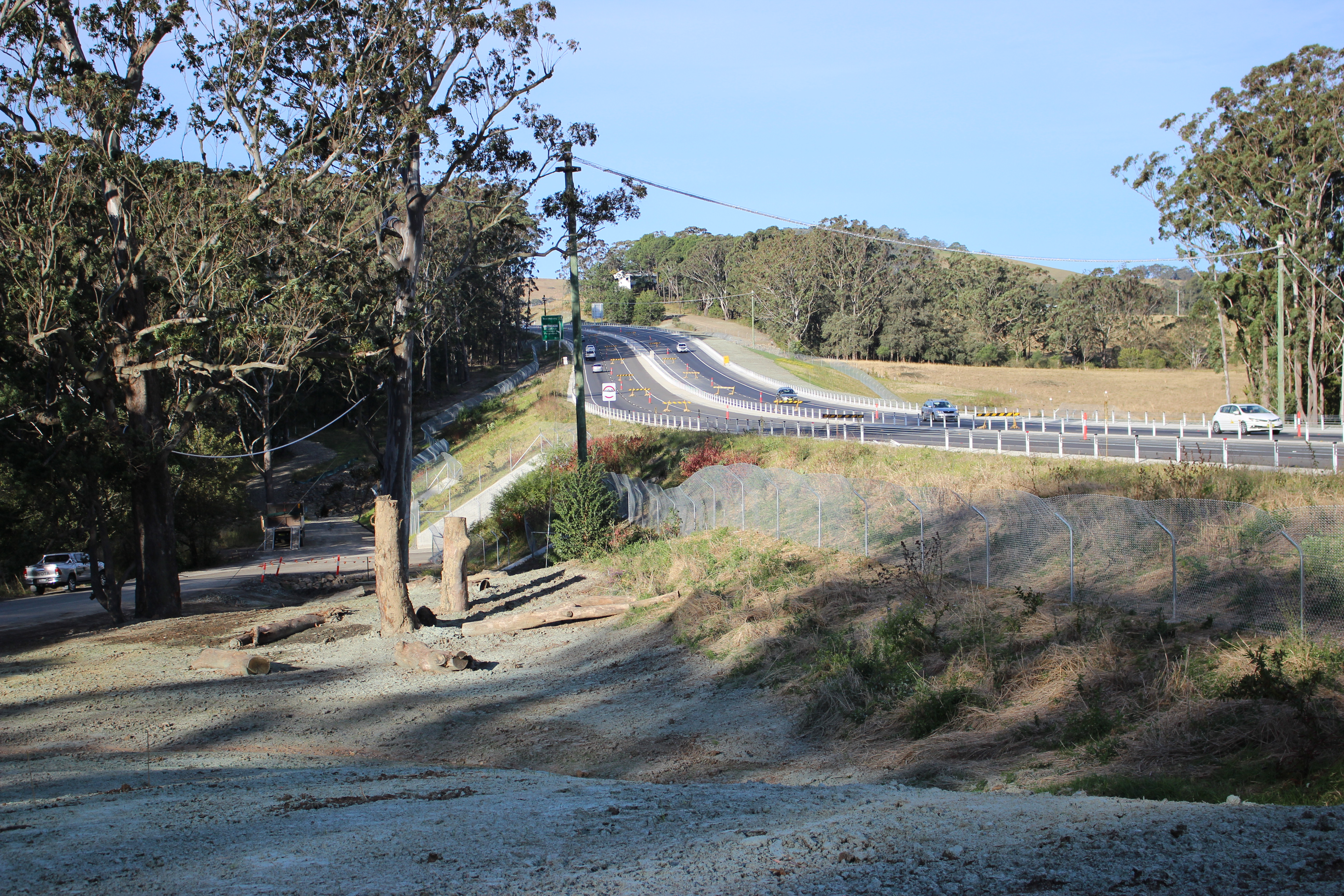
- Princes Highway at Broughton

- Coordinates: 34°45′57″S 150°44′02″E
- Country: Australia
- State: New South Wales
- Region: South Coast
- LGA: City of Shoalhaven
- Location: 22 km (14 mi) SW of Kiama; 23 km (14 mi) NE of Nowra; 142 km (88 mi) SSW of Sydney

Government
  - State electorate: Kiama
  - Federal division: Gilmore
- Elevation: 26 m (85 ft)

Population
  - Total: 85 (SAL 2021)
- Postcode: 2535
- County: Camden
- Parish: Broughton
Localities around Broughton
| Broughton Vale | Broughton Vale | Broughton Village |
| Broughton Vale | Broughton | Broughton Village |
| Berry | Berry | Berry |

Broughton is a locality in the City of Shoalhaven in New South Wales, Australia. It lies on the Princes Highway between Gerringong and Berry and between Broughton and Broughton Mill creeks. At the 2016 census, it had a population of 87. Broughton is not to be confused with Broughton Village, a locality that lies to its immediate northeast, or Broughton Vale, which lies to its immediate north.

The locality is named after Broughton, a local Dharawal man who was employed as a guide and intermediary for the early British colonists.
