= Bellawongarah =

- Town
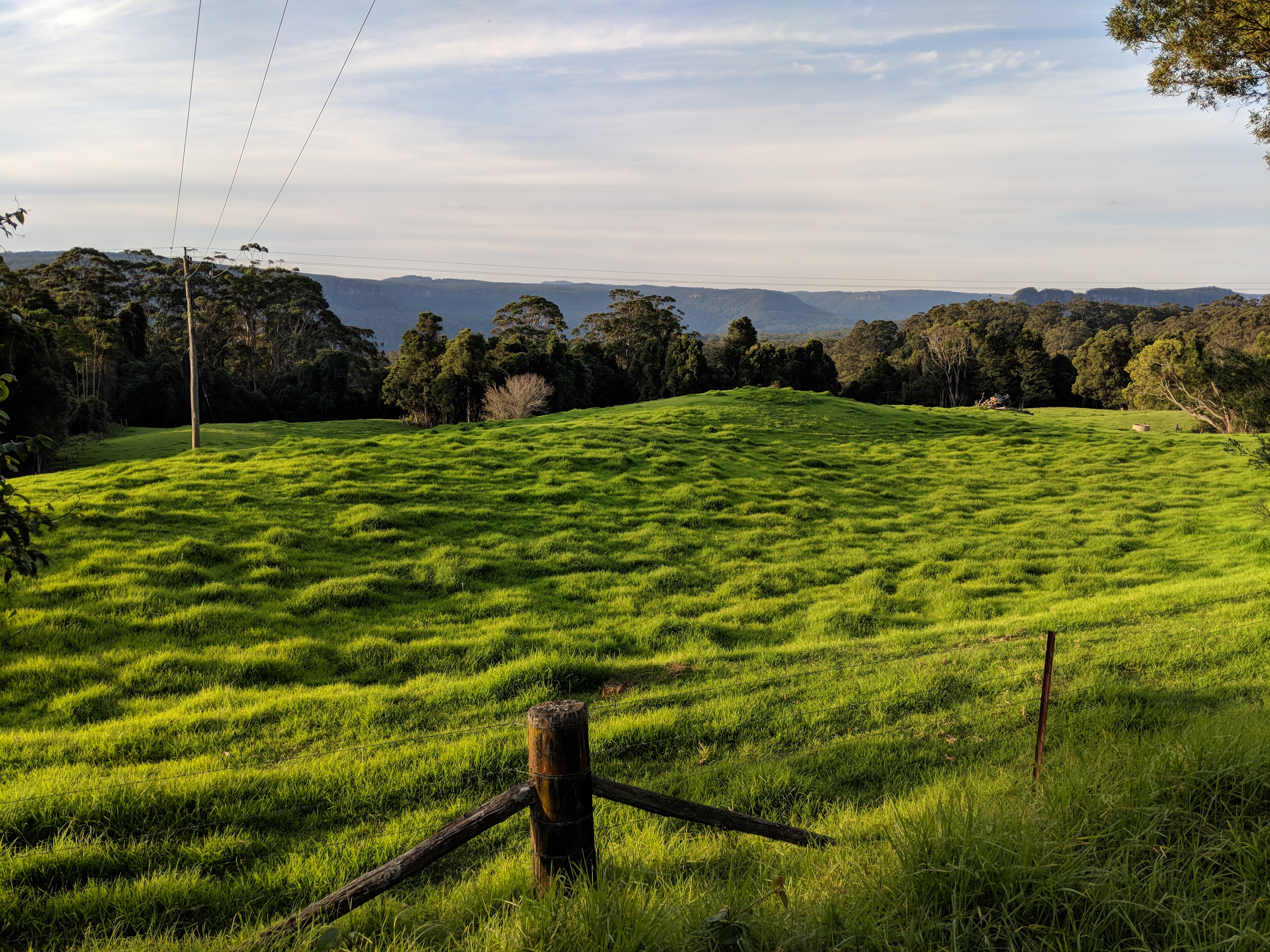
- Bellawongarah with Illawarra escarpment in the background

- Coordinates: 34°45′57″S 150°37′02″E
- Country: Australia
- State: New South Wales
- Region: South Coast
- LGA: City of Shoalhaven
- Location: 160 km (99 mi) S of Sydney; 23 km (14 mi) N of Nowra; 34 km (21 mi) WSW of Kiama; 50 km (31 mi) SE of Bowral

Government
  - State electorate: Kiama
  - Federal division: Gilmore
- Elevation: 508 m (1,667 ft)

Population
  - Total: 127 (2016 census)
- Postcode: 2535
- County: Camden
- Parish: Cambewarra
Localities around Bellawongarah
Kangaroo Valley	Wattamolla	Bundewallah
Kangaroo Valley	Bellawongarah	Berry Mountain
Beaumont	Beaumont	Jaspers Brush

Bellawongarah is a locality in the City of Shoalhaven in New South Wales, Australia. It lies west of the Princes Highway on the Kangaroo Valley Road between Berry and Kangaroo Valley. It lies about 23 km north of Nowra and about 160 km south of Sydney. At the 2016 census, it had a population of 127. It lies on a ridge and is partly covered by temperate rain forest and partly by grasslands that were formerly used for dairying, but are now mainly used for rural residences.

== History ==
Bellawongarah takes its name from a nearby country-style inn, located next to Church Cottage, a heritage-registered cottage.

Bellawongarah had a state school from 1874 to 1944. It was variously described as a "public", "provisional" or "half-time".
