= Beaumont, New South Wales =

Beaumont
- Town
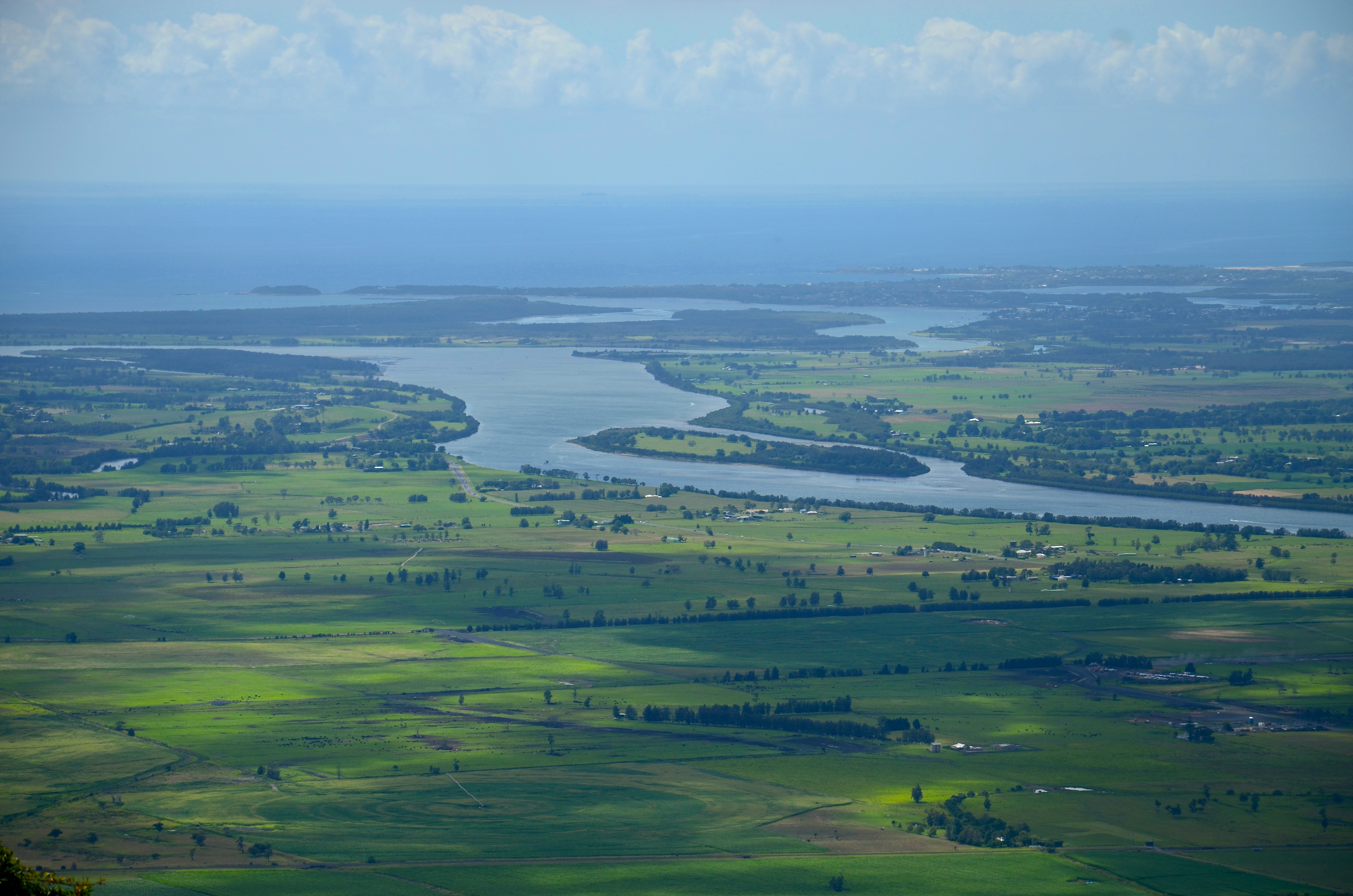
- Lower Shoalhaven from Cambewarra Mountain lookout

- Coordinates: 34°46′57″S 150°34′02″E
- Country: Australia
- State: New South Wales
- Region: South Coast
- LGA: City of Shoalhaven
- Location: 178 km (111 mi) S of Sydney; 18 km (11 mi) N of Nowra; 27 km (17 mi) SE of Kangaroo Valley; 36 km (22 mi) W of Kiama

Government
  - State electorate: Kiama
  - Federal division: Gilmore
- Elevation: 324 m (1,063 ft)

Population
  - Total: 125 (2016 census)
- Postcode: 2577
- County: Camden
- Parish: Cambewarra
Localities around Beaumont
Kangaroo Valley	Kangaroo Valley	Bellawongarah
Red Rocks	Beaumont	Jaspers Brush
Browns Mountain	Cambewarra Village	Cambewarra

Beaumont is a locality in the City of Shoalhaven in New South Wales, Australia. It lies on Cambewarra Range about 18 km north of Nowra on both sides of the Kangaroo Valley–Nowra road. It includes the Cambewarra Mountain lookout, which gives a good view of the lower Shoalhaven valley. At the 2016 census, it had a population of 125.
