= Fishermans Paradise, New South Wales =

Fishermans Paradise
- Town
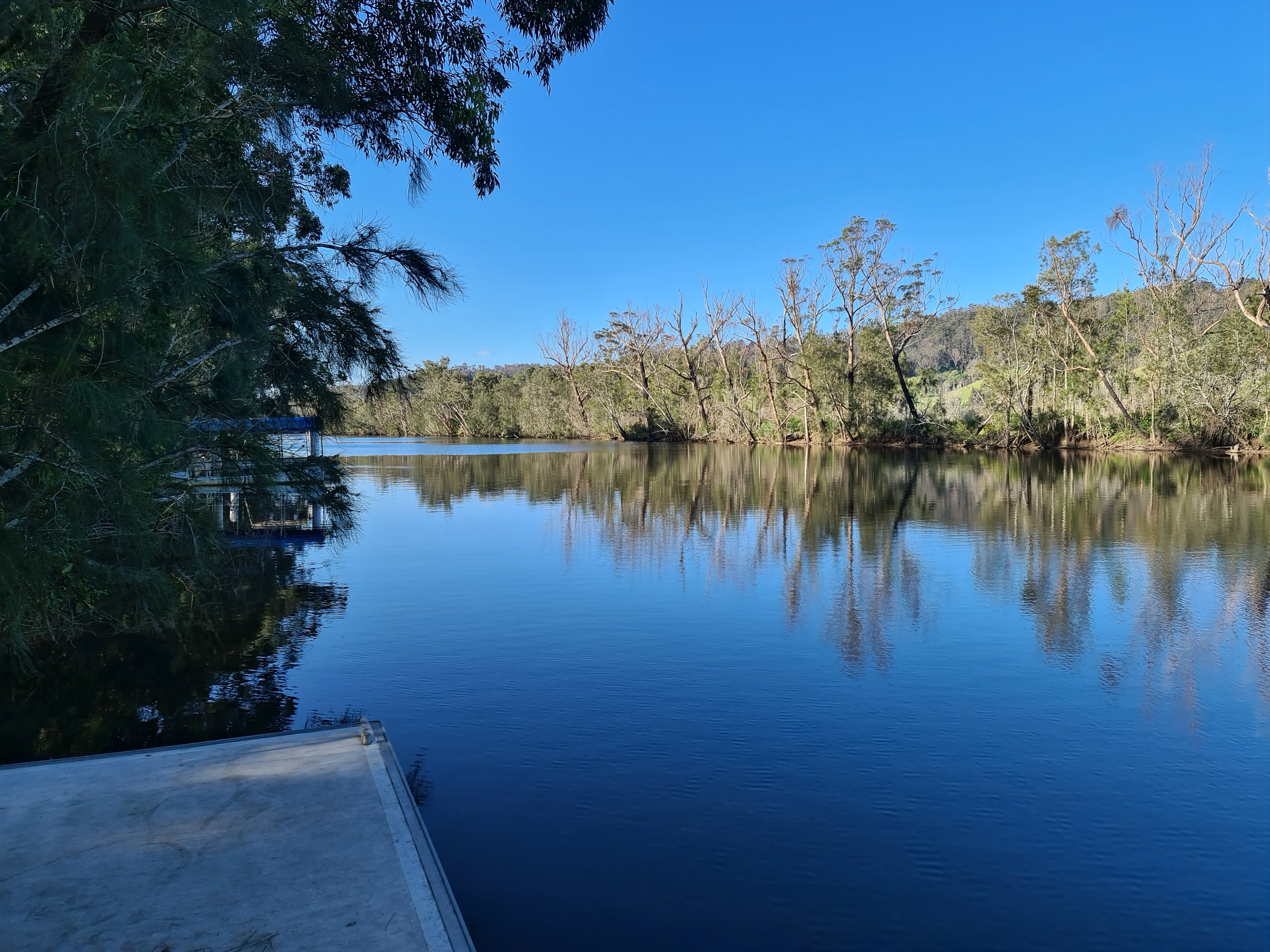
- Conjola Creek at Fishermans Paradise Boat Ramp

- Coordinates: 35°13′46″S 150°26′55″E
- Country: Australia
- State: New South Wales
- LGA: City of Shoalhaven

Government
  - State electorate: South Coast
  - Federal division: Gilmore

Population
  - Total: 477 (2016 census)
- Postcode: 2539

Fishermans Paradise is a small town located in the South Coast Region of New South Wales.

During the Black Summer bushfires, The Currowan fire almost surrounded the town cutting it off. The Conjola fire station inside the town was the last line of defence along with locals.
