= Kangaroo Valley, New South Wales =

Kangaroo Valley Parronrah
- Suburb
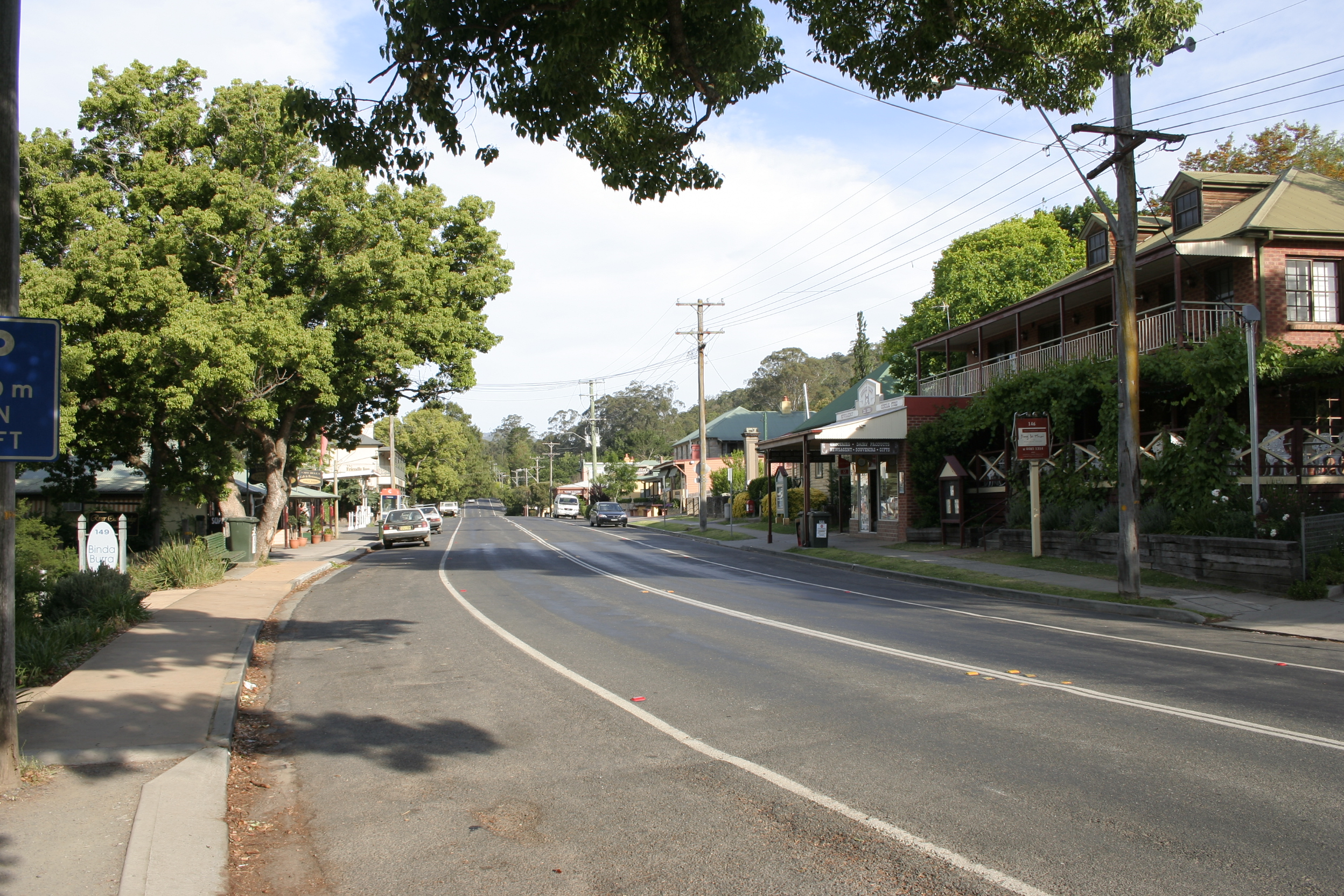
- Main street of Kangaroo Valley, 2006

- Coordinates: 34°44′S 150°32′E
- Country: Australia
- State: New South Wales
- Region: Southern Highlands
- LGA: City of Shoalhaven
- Location: 160 km (99 mi) S of Sydney; 34 km (21 mi) SE of Moss Vale; 24 km (15 mi) N of Nowra
- Established: 1817

Government
  - State electorate: Kiama
  - Federal division: Gilmore

Area
  - Total: 256 km^{2} (99 sq mi)
- Elevation: 86 m (282 ft)

Population
  - Total: 879 (2016 census)
  - Density: 3.434/km^{2} (8.893/sq mi)
- Time zone: UTC+10 (AEST)
  - Summer (DST): UTC+11 (AEDT)
- County: Camden
- Parish: Cambewarra
Suburbs around Kangaroo Valley
Meryla	Barrengarry	Upper Kangaroo River
Meryla	Kangaroo Valley	Wattamolla
Moollattoo	Red Rocks	Beaumont

Kangaroo Valley (Dharawal language: Parronrah) is a river valley along the Kangaroo River in the Shoalhaven region of New South Wales, Australia, located west of the seaside in the City of Shoalhaven. It is also the name of the small suburb within it, formerly known as Osborne, with a population of 879 in the 2016 census. The township is accessed by the Moss Vale Road, which links Moss Vale to the Princes Highway at Bomaderry north of Nowra via the B73 route.

== General ==
As of 2013, the small town has a variety of arts and craft shops, restaurants and cafes, a hotel, club, post office, supermarket and other businesses, including an ambulance station, general practitioner and a chemist.

Kangaroo Valley has a bus service to/from Nowra or Moss Vale. Kennedy's Bus Company operates to Kangaroo Valley via Cambewarra.

Events held in the town include the Kangaroo Valley Agricultural and Horticultural Show in February each year, Kangaroo Valley Folk Festival in October each year, biannually the Kangaroo Valley Arts Festival and monthly markets at Kangaroo Valley Village Markets.

== History ==
The first inhabitants of Kangaroo Valley were the Australian Aboriginal Wodi-Wodi people, who had reportedly occupied the land for around 20,000 years before the European settlement of Australia in 1788. An 1826 census indicated 79 Aborigines lived in the valley in five separate encampments. The first recorded European sighting of the valley was in April 1812, when surveyor-explorer George Evans passed through the area as he travelled north from his exploration of Jervis Bay. Evans reportedly claimed that the valley offered a view that "no painter could beautify."

The area was first settled in 1817 when Charles Throsby, an explorer and Captain Richard Brooks, a cattleman, opened the area for colonial settlement. The felling and exporting of Australian red cedar (Toona ciliata) trees quickly became the main industry in Kangaroo Valley. By the mid-1840s, a number of dairy farmers made the region their home, specialising in the production of butter as other dairy products such as milk could not be exported as they would often curdle long before they had completed the journey out of Kangaroo Valley to neighbouring settlements.

By the 1870s, activity had begun to concentrate in the area that is now the village, as other centres in Kangaroo Valley, such as Trendally, died with the dairy industry in the region. Both the Church of the Good Shepherd (built in 1870–72) and rectory (built in 1879 by John Tanner) were designed by John Horbury Hunt, and are listed on the (now defunct) Register of the National Estate.

The local public school was built in 1884 of local sandstone. Further additions constructed of weatherboard and brick were made later. The local courthouse was built c.1910, also of local sandstone. The design is asymmetrical and features a sloping buttress and arch. The main buildings include a residence and lock-up as well as the courthouse itself. Alterations and extensions have taken place over the years. The local school and the courthouse are both listed on the Register of the National Estate.

The valley has changed very little in the past 130 years with reminders such as the Hampden Bridge, completed in 1898, and the oldest suspension bridge in Australia, and old Barrengarry School serving as a testimony to the past when Kangaroo Valley was home to a flourishing dairy industry. Agriculture still exists, though other industries such as tourism have since taken over as the primary source of income.

== Heritage listings ==
Kangaroo Valley has a number of heritage-listed sites, including:

- Moss Vale Road: Hampden Bridge

== Demographics ==
In the 2016 Census, there were 879 people in Kangaroo Valley. 69.7% of people were born in Australia and 88.5% of people spoke only English at home. The most common responses for religion in Kangaroo Valley were "no religion" 35.1%, Anglican 21.4% and Catholic 14.3%.

== Geography ==
Kangaroo Valley is a gently sloping wide valley surrounded on its sides by high mountains of the NSW Southern Highlands, approximately two hours' drive south-west of Sydney and about two hours north of Canberra. Flying Fox Pass looks over the valley. A few kilometres further north is the Fitzroy Falls.

== Cultural activities and events ==
The district has a strong artistic community and, since 2007, has mounted a biannual arts and music festival. In 2009, the festival celebrated the 80th birthday of Australian composer Peter Sculthorpe with three concerts devoted to his music.

The annual Kangaroo Valley Folk Festival in October is presented by Shoalhaven Folk Club Inc with local, Australian and international performers.

The historic township of Kangaroo Valley shares its secrets with a visit to the Pioneer Farm Museum where this historical settlement depicting farm life in the second half of the 19th and early 20th century is brought to life. Invigorating bush walks are available at the back of the museum park including the Walker Suspension Bridge spanning 72 metres and leading to two marked bush walks on more than seven hectares of natural reserve.

== Education ==
Kangaroo Valley Public School, the local public primary school, is a focal point for the community. It has a reputation for excellence in academic, sporting, community and cultural endeavours.

The Scots College's Glengarry outdoor education campus for year-nine students is located in Kangaroo Valley. On 200 acres (0.81 km^{2}), it has five 20-bed dormitories, six classrooms, a gymnasium and a theatrette. The Scots College participates in several community events including the ANZAC Day March and Ceremony and the A&H Society Annual Show in February.

== See also ==
- Shoalhaven Scheme

== Gallery ==
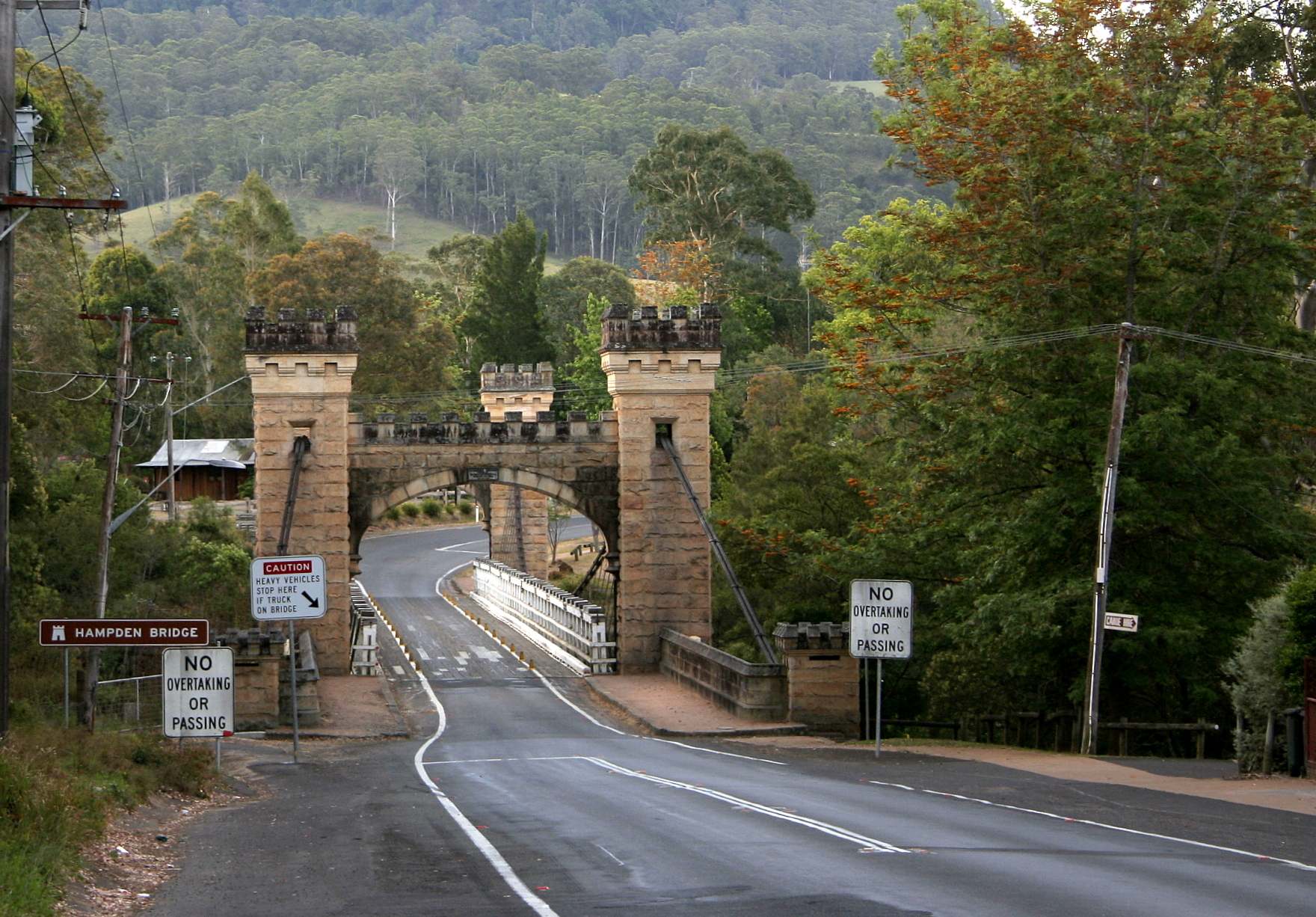
Hampden Bridge, 2006

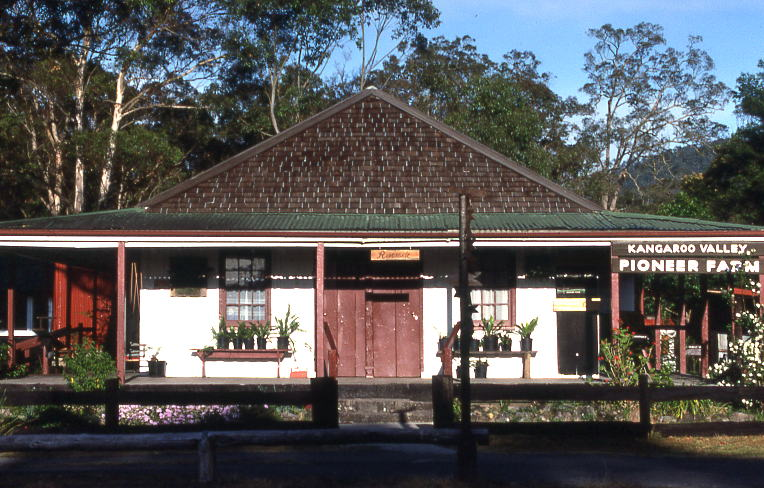
Pioneer Village Museum

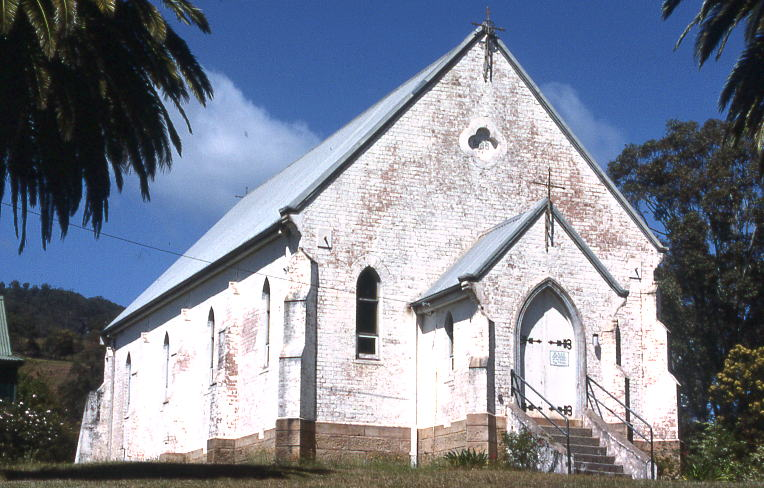
Catholic church

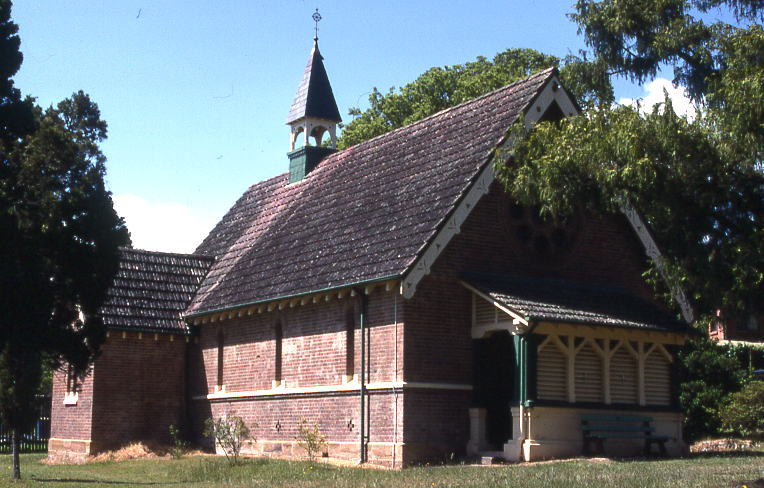
Church of the Good Shepherd
