= City of Shoalhaven =

Local government in New South Wales, Australia

- Local government area
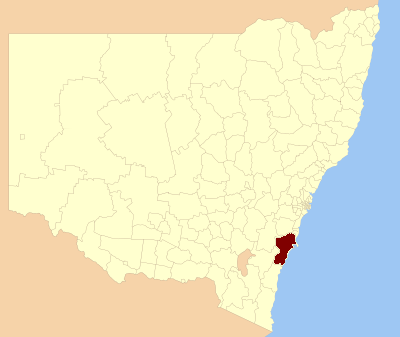
- Location in New South Wales

- Interactive map of City of Shoalhaven
- Coordinates: 35°07′S 150°30′E
- Country: Australia
- State: New South Wales
- Region: South Coast
- Established: 1 July 1948
- Council seat: Nowra

Government
  - Mayor: Patricia White
  - State electorates: South Coast; Kiama
  - Federal division: Gilmore

Area
  - Total: 4,567 km^{2} (1,763 sq mi)

Population
  - Total: 108,531 (2021 census)
  - Density: 23.7642/km^{2} (61.549/sq mi)
- Website: City of Shoalhaven
LGAs around City of Shoalhaven
| Goulburn Mulwaree | Wingecarribee | Kiama |
| Goulburn Mulwaree | City of Shoalhaven | Tasman Sea, Jervis Bay Territory (ACT) |
| Queanbeyan–Palerang | Eurobodalla | Tasman Sea |

The City of Shoalhaven is a local government area in the South Coast region of New South Wales, Australia. The area is about 200 kilometres (120 mi) south of Sydney. The Princes Highway passes through the area, and the South Coast railway line traverses the northern section, terminating at Bomaderry. At the 2021 census, the population was 108,531.

== History ==
Modern-day groupings of the Illawarra and South Coast Aboriginal peoples are based on information compiled by white anthropologists from the late 1870s. Two divisions were initially presented (refer Ridley, 1878), using geographical location and language, though these criteria are now expanded into five divisions and given Aboriginal names, as follows (after C.Sefton, 1983):

- Dharawal – general name for the Aboriginal people of the area on the east coast of New South Wales from Botany Bay to Shoalhaven, and west to Berrima and Camden.
- Wodiwodi (or Wadi-Wadi) – a subdivision of Thuruwal, includes the Aboriginal people of the coast from Wollongong to Shoalhaven.
- Gurandada and Tharumba (or Dharumba) – those people living around the Shoalhaven River.

The Jerrinja people record their traditional lands as stretching from Crooked River in the north to Clyde River in the south, from the mountains to the sea at Roseby Park.

George Bass explored the area in 1797, following Seven Mile Beach. He crossed the shoals at the entrance to the river, calling it "Shoals Haven" due to the shallowness of the river mouth. This river is now known as the Crookhaven, but the name was adopted for the Shoalhaven area and the Shoalhaven River.

The city was established on 1 July 1948 as the Shoalhaven Shire, following the amalgamation of the Municipalities of Nowra, Berry, Broughton's Vale, Ulladulla, South Shoalhaven, and the shires of Cambewarra and Clyde. On 13 July 1979, Governor Roden Cutler proclaimed Shoalhaven as a city. The Shire was converted and constituted on 1 August 1979 simultaneously as a municipality and city.

== Towns and localities in the local government area ==
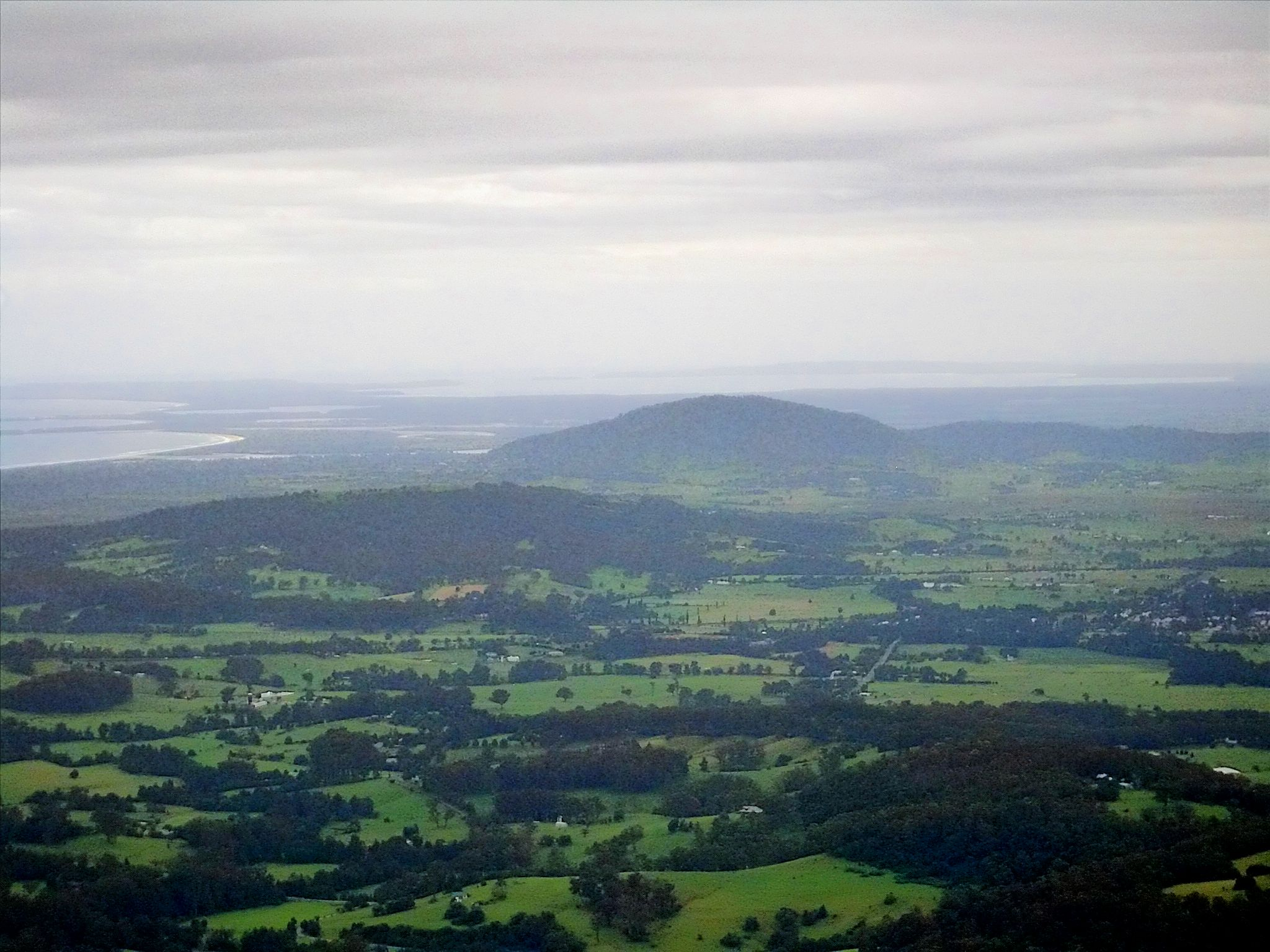
A large part of Shoalhaven can be seen from the Drawing Room Rocks area in Barren Grounds Nature Reserve. Mount Coolangatta is in the centre, with Jervis Bay in background and Berry in the right front

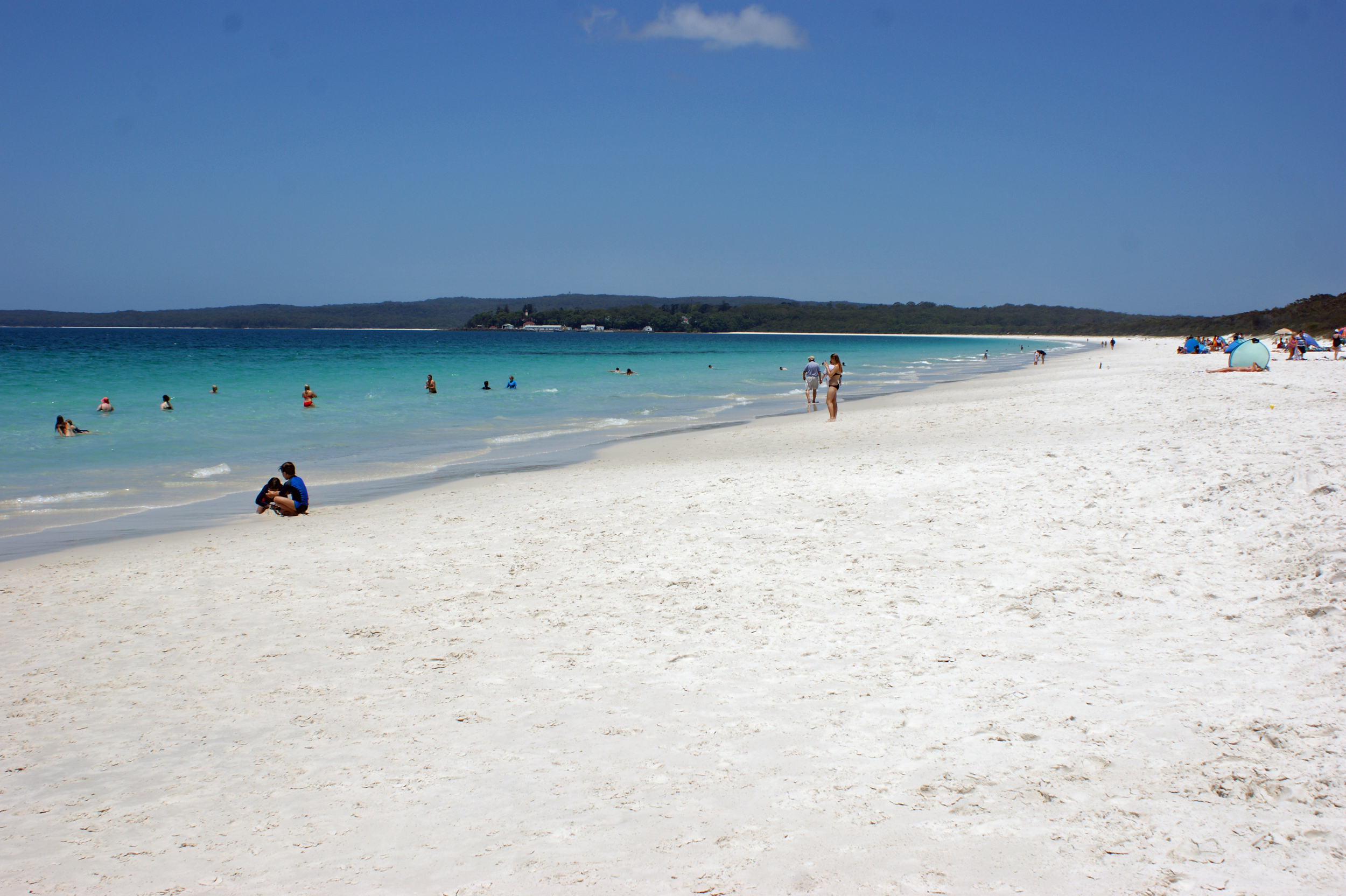
Hyams Beach, known for possessing fine, radiantly white sand.

Shoalhaven, although designated a city, is a dispersed region spread over 125 kilometres (78 mi) of coastline, with the vast majority of its population located in the north-east around Nowra, Jervis Bay and Sussex Inlet.

It includes the following towns, suburbs and localities:

Nowra suburbs and surrounds

- Bangalee
- Bomaderry
- Cambewarra
- Cambewarra Village
- Mundamia
- North Nowra
- Nowra Hill
- South Nowra
- Tapitallee
- Terara
- West Nowra
- Worrigee

North of Shoalhaven River

- Back Forest
- Barrengarry
- Beaumont
- Bellawongarah
- Berry
- Berry Mountain
- Bolong
- Brogers Creek (part)
- Broughton
- Broughton Vale
- Broughton Village (part)
- Browns Mountain
- Budgong
- Bundewallah
- Coolangatta
- Far Meadow
- Gerringong
- Illaroo
- Jaspers Brush
- Kangaroo Valley
- Meroo Meadow
- Shoalhaven Heads
- Upper Kangaroo River
- Watersleigh
- Wattamolla
- Woodhill

Suburbs near Jervis Bay Territory

- Basin View
- Bream Beach
- Callala Bay
- Callala Beach
- Comberton
- Erowal Bay
- Huskisson
- Hyams Beach
- Myola
- Old Erowal Bay
- Sanctuary Point
- St Georges Basin
- Vincentia
- Woollamia
- Worrowing Heights
- Wrights Beach

South of Shoalhaven River

- Bamarang
- Barringella
- Beecroft Peninsula
- Bewong
- Brundee
- Burrier
- Comerong Island
- Culburra Beach
- Currarong
- Falls Creek
- Greenwell Point
- Jerrawangala
- Kinghorne
- Longreach
- Mayfield
- Numbaa
- Orient Point
- Parma
- Pyree
- Sassafras
- Tomerong
- Tullarwalla
- Wandandian
- Wollumboola
- Yerriyong

near or on the Sussex Inlet

- Berrara
- Cudmirrah
- Swanhaven

Ulladulla

- Berringer Lake
- Burrill Lake
- Dolphin Point
- Kings Point
- Little Forest
- Milton
- Mollymook
- Mollymook Beach
- Narrawallee
- Woodburn

Far South

- Bawley Point
- Bendalong
- Brooman
- Cockwhy
- Conjola
- Conjola Park
- Croobyar
- Cunjurong Point
- Currowan (part)
- Depot Beach
- Durras North
- East Lynne (part)
- Fishermans Paradise
- Kioloa
- Lake Conjola
- Manyana
- Mogood
- Mount Kingiman
- Pebbly Beach
- Pointer Mountain
- Pretty Beach
- Tabourie Lake
- Termeil
- Woodstock
- Yatte Yattah

Localities with no population in 2016 included:

- Barren Grounds (part)
- Boolijah
- Buangla
- Coolumburra
- Endrick
- Ettrema
- Moollattoo
- Mondayong
- Porters Creek
- Quiera
- St George
- Tallowal
- Tianjara
- Tolwong
- Tullarwalla
- Twelve Mile Peg
- Yadboro
- Yalwal

== Council ==
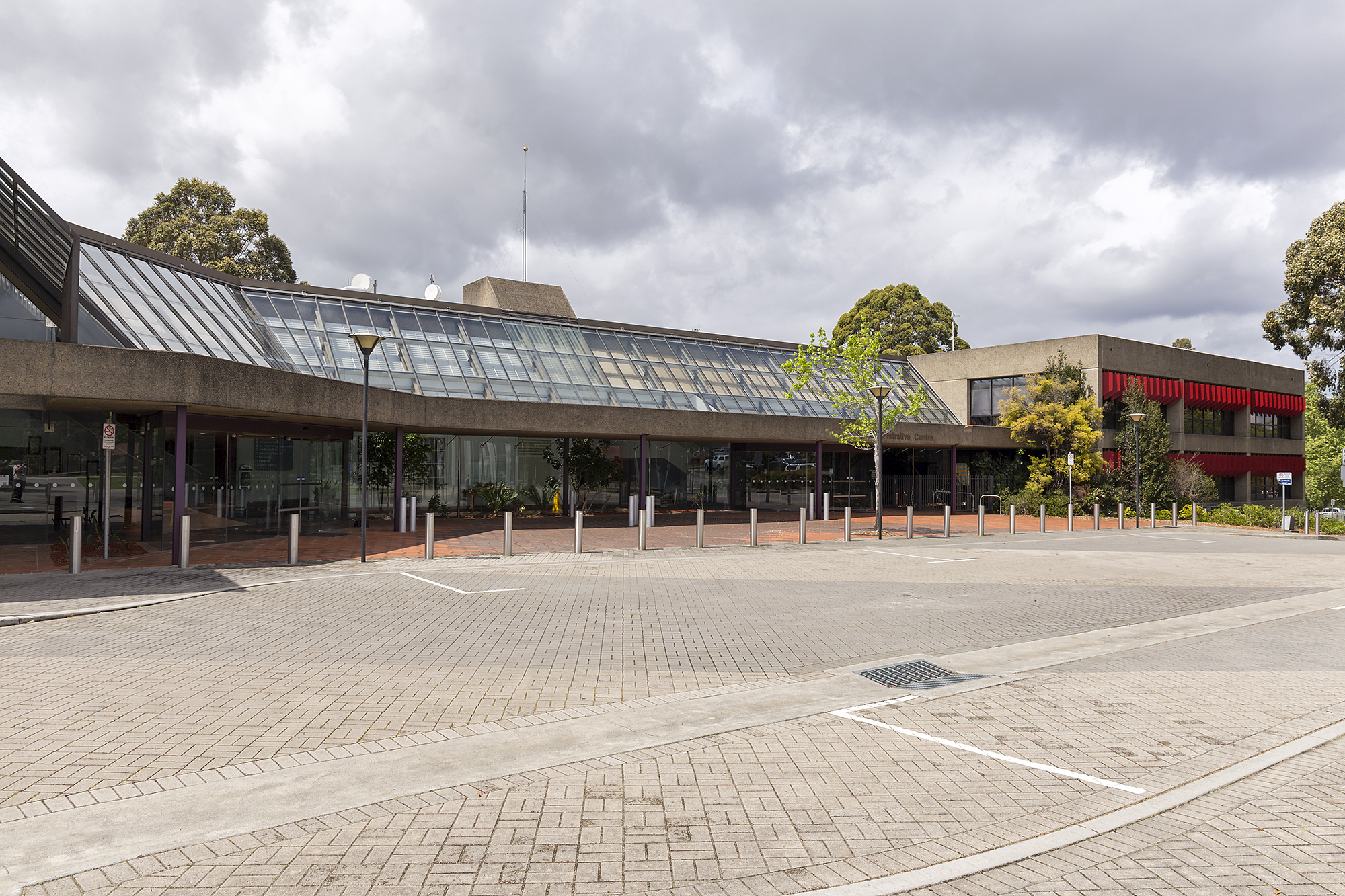
City Administration Centre in Nowra

=== Current composition and election method ===
Shoalhaven City Council is composed of thirteen councillors, including the mayor, for a fixed four-year term. The mayor is directly elected while the twelve other councillors are elected proportionally as three separate wards, each electing four councillors.

| Party | Councillors |
|---|---|
| Greens | 1 |
| Shoalhaven Independents Group | 7 |
| Labor | 2 |
| Liberal | 0 |
| Total | 13 |

== Election results ==
=== 2024 ===
2024 New South Wales local elections: Shoalhaven
| Party | Votes | % | Swing | Seats | Change |
|---|---|---|---|---|---|
| Shoalhaven Independents | 30,231 | 46.33 | +4.79 | 6 | ▲2 |
| Team Tribe | 13,301 | 20.38 | +20.38 | 3 | ▲3 |
| Labor | 13,281 | 20.35 | +0.13 | 3 | Steady |
| Greens | 8,439 | 12.93 | −13.66 | 0 | ▼3 |
| Formal votes | 65,252 | | | | |
| Informal votes | 5,614 | | | | |
| Total | 70,866 | | | 12 | |
| Registered voters / turnout | 85,835 | | | | |

== Mayors ==
| Image | Mayor | Party | Term | Notes |
|---|---|---|---|---|
| | Greg Watson | Independent | 20 September 1980 – 24 September 1983 | First directly elected mayor. Lost seat |
| | Harry Sawkins (1913/14–1987) | Independent | 24 September 1983 – 11 March 1987 | Died in office. Was planning to contest the 1987 election |
| | Max Atkins | Independent | 26 September 1987 – 11 September 1999 | |
| | Greg Watson | Independent | 11 September 1999 – 2004 | Lost seat |
| | Greg Watson | Shoalhaven Independents | 2004 – 13 September 2008 | Lost seat |
| | Paul Green (b. 1966) | Independent; Christian Democrat | 13 September 2008 – 8 September 2012 | Elected to New South Wales Legislative Council in 2011 |
| | Joanna Gash (b. 1944) | Team Gash | 8 September 2012 – 10 September 2016 | Lost seat |
| | Amanda Findley | Greens | 10 September 2016 – 14 September 2024 | Retired |
| | Patricia White | Shoalhaven Independents | 14 September 2024 – present | Incumbent |

== Past councillors ==
=== 2021−2024 ===
==== Ward 1 ====
| Year | Councillor | Party | Councillor | Party | Councillor | Party | Councillor | Party |
|---|---|---|---|---|---|---|---|---|
| 2021 | Serena Copley | Independent Liberal | Tonia Gray | Greens | Matthew Norris | Labor | John Wells | Shoalhaven Independents |
| 2024 | Serena Copley | Liberal | Tonia Gray | Greens | Matthew Norris | Labor | John Wells | Shoalhaven Independents |

==== Ward 2 ====
| Year | Councillor | Party | Councillor | Party | Councillor | Party | Councillor | Party |
|---|---|---|---|---|---|---|---|---|
| 2021 | Evan Christen | Greens | Paul Ell | Independent Liberal | John Kotlash | Labor | Greg Watson | Shoalhaven Independents |
| 2024 | Evan Christen | Greens | Paul Ell | Liberal | John Kotlash | Labor | Greg Watson | Shoalhaven Independents |

==== Ward 3 ====
| Year | Councillor | Party | Councillor | Party | Councillor | Party | Councillor | Party |
|---|---|---|---|---|---|---|---|---|
| 2021 | Liza Butler | Labor | Moo D'Ath | Greens | Mark Kitchener | Shoalhaven Independents | Patricia White | Shoalhaven Independents |
| 2023 | Gillian Boyd | Labor | Moo D'Ath | Greens | Mark Kitchener | Shoalhaven Independents | Patricia White | Shoalhaven Independents |

== Tourism and culture ==
The Shoalhaven can be reached from Sydney by car via the Princes Highway and by rail via the South Coast railway line which terminates just north of Nowra at Bomaderry. The Shoalhaven is adjacent to the Jervis Bay Territory. The area is approximately 160 kilometres (99 mi) long along the coastline, including 109 beaches, which allegedly possesses the whitest sand in the world, as well as pristine natural Australian bushland. The Shoalhaven area is home to numerous species of native Australian flora and fauna.

The area is well known for its strong commitment to the arts and music, featuring the See Change and See Celebrations festivals in the Jervis Bay and St Georges Basin areas, as well as the EscapeArtfest festival and Blessing of the Fleet in the Ulladulla area.

Tourists to Shoalhaven can enjoy a wealth of cultural and nature-based activities and experiences, including whale-watching, kayaking, visiting beaches and tastings at wineries. Some of the most famous establishments for visitors in Shoalhaven are Rick Stein at Bannisters, Cupitt's Estate and Coolangatta Estate.

== Heritage listings ==
Heritage listings for the City of Shoalhaven include:

- Bherwerre Beach, Wreck Bay: Hive shipwreck

== See also ==
- Local government areas of New South Wales
- Shoalhaven River
- Shoalhaven Scheme
