= Stewart Ryrie (colonial settler) =

Stewart Ryrie (1778–1852) was a colonial settler of New South Wales and patriarch of the Ryrie family of colonial settlers.

== Early life ==
Ryrie was born at Caithness in Scotland in 1778.

== Life ==
=== British Army career ===
Ryrie served in the British Army, as Deputy-Assistant Commissary General—a rank equivalent to Lieutenant—on the staff of Commissary General Sir Robert Hugh Kennedy, during the Peninsula War, and was said to have been present at the Battle of Waterloo.

=== Life in colonial New South Wales ===
Ryrie came to New South Wales, in 1825, as the new Deputy Commissary General—a rank equivalent to a Lieutenant Colonel or Major—to work in the Commissariat Department of the colony. He brought his family with him. His first wife Anne (née Stewart) had died in 1816, and he married Isabella (née Cassels), prior to leaving Scotland in 1825. He had six children—four sons and two daughters—from his first marriage, and another three sons were born in Australia from his second marriage.

The Governor of New South Wales, between 1824 and 1831 was Ralph Darling. Ryrie's deceased wife, Anne, was the sister of William Stewart (1769–1854). Until 1827, Stewart was Lieutenant-Governor of New South Wales, under Darling, who regarded him favourably and granted him land at Mt Pleasant, near Bathurst. Ryrie and his family were, therefore, well-connected to Darling's administration and well-placed to benefit from its tendency to nepotism and to favour those of a military background.

The Ryrie family became prominent landholders, during the years of Darling's administration; both as a result of land grants made by Darling and by taking up squatting runs outside the Nineteen Counties. During these years, the family took over parts of the traditional lands of Walbanga people (a group of Yuin) and Ngarigo people.

In 1827, Ryrie was appointed by Darling to act as the Auditor of Colonial Accompts, an auditor of the accounts. Ryrie retired from the Commissariat Department and public duties in 1829.

In 1829, he took up a squatting run, 'Coolringdon', one of the earliest colonial settlements in the Monaro. However, he appears to have resided at his son William's landholding, 'Arnprior', at Larbert, near Braidwood. When his son James died in 1840, James's holding, at the adjacent locality of Durran Durra, was consolidated with 'Arnprior'. Ryrie and his son, William, were prominent backers of The Wool Road.

It appears that the family fortunes were badly affected, by the drought and economic depression of the early 1840s and probably also by the failure of The Wool Road and the port of South Huskisson. The economics of their operations were also adversely impacted by the ending of the assignment of new convicts to private landholders, in July 1841.

In 1841, Ryrie was advocating increased immigration, giving evidence that the lack of shepherds were affecting his grazing activities. By this time, his sons had extended their grazing lands to the Port Phillip District, at what is now Yering, by taking over part of the traditional lands of the Wurundjeri people.

Ryrie was insolvent in March 1844, with a deficiency of £7,861 10s. 5d., a large amount at that time. 'Coolringdon' officially changed ownership around this time. In 1845, Ryrie's son, Stewart Ryrie Jr, was managing 'Coolringdon' on behalf of a new owner, Dr Francis Lascelles Wallace, who was Ryrie's son-in-law. William Ryrie tried, unsuccessfully, to dispose of 'Arnprior', in November 1844, possibly in relation to Ryrie's insolvency. However, Ryrie would continue to reside there, for the remainder of his life, and both properties remained within the Ryrie family.

While residing at 'Arnprior'—at the locality of Larbert, then known by its Aboriginal name that was recorded by settlers as Kurraduckbidgee—he was responsible for the annual distribution of government blankets to the surviving, largely dispossessed, local Aboriginal people. They made up a song about him, and its words, in the pidgin language that they used when speaking to settlers, were, "Mittee Ryrie, Koaderaduckbidgee chingle house carry, gammon galah, harp blanket gibbit." The precise meaning of the song is unclear, but 'gammon' is a word meaning 'fake', 'pathetic', or 'to pretend or lie'; it is quite conceivable that the song was not complementary to Ryrie.

=== Death ===
Ryrie died, on 11 December 1852, at 'Arnprior', and his widow, Isabella, died there in May 1855.

== Issue and extended family ==
His children became the second generation of what would be an enduring pastoral dynasty. The extended Ryrie family grew as a result of intermarriage with other colonial settlers, particularly with female descendants of John Mackenzie (1791–1857) and Alured Tasker Faunce (1808–1856).

Two of the sons of his first marriage became prominent. William Ryrie (1805–1856) is notable as a pioneering settler colonist of the Braidwood district of New South Wales and the Port Phillip District (now Victoria). Stewart Ryrie Jr (1812–1883) is notable as an explorer of the Snowy Mountains and as a pioneer settler colonist of Jindabyne; he married, Janet, daughter of John Mackenzie. Their brothers James Stewart Ryrie (1806–1840) and Donald Horne Ryrie (1810–1888), assisted William to settle the new Port Phillip District. By 1859, Donald Ryrie resided near Jindabyne, and lived there until his death.

Both of Ryrie's daughters—Elizabeth (1804–1826) and Jane (1816–1850)—married and died relatively young. Elizabeth married Affleck Moodie, Assistant Commissary General of Van Diemen's Land, and lived in Hobart, before dying without children. Jane married Francis Lascelles Wallace (1811–1852), a medical doctor and an early settler of the area around Braidwood. Their son was Stewart Ryrie Wallace (1847–1870), and their only other surviving child was a daughter, Mary Elizabeth (1849–1887), who married and was living in England when she died. Francis Wallace's three nephews—sons of Wallace's brother, Hugh Wallace (1808–1868)—would become major landholders in the Monaro region.

The three Australian-born children of Ryrie's second marriage also became prominent. Alexander Ryrie (1827–1909) and David Ryrie (1829–1893), are notable as pioneering settler colonists, of Michelago and Bombala, and as politicians. These two brothers both married daughters of another colonial settler, Alured Tasker Faunce, who were also granddaughters of John Mackenzie and nieces of Janet, the wife of Stewart Ryrie, Jun.. John Cassels Ryrie (1826–1900) withdrew from partnership with his two brothers, in 1865, and took up the 'Maffra' sheep run south of Cooma. He later was a grazier residing in the Dubbo area, and held vast landholdings in New South Wales and Queensland.

== See also ==
- William Ryrie
- Stewart Ryrie Jr
- Alexander Ryrie
- David Ryrie
- Granville Ryrie
- John Ryrie
