= The Wool Road =

Historic road in New South Wales, Australia

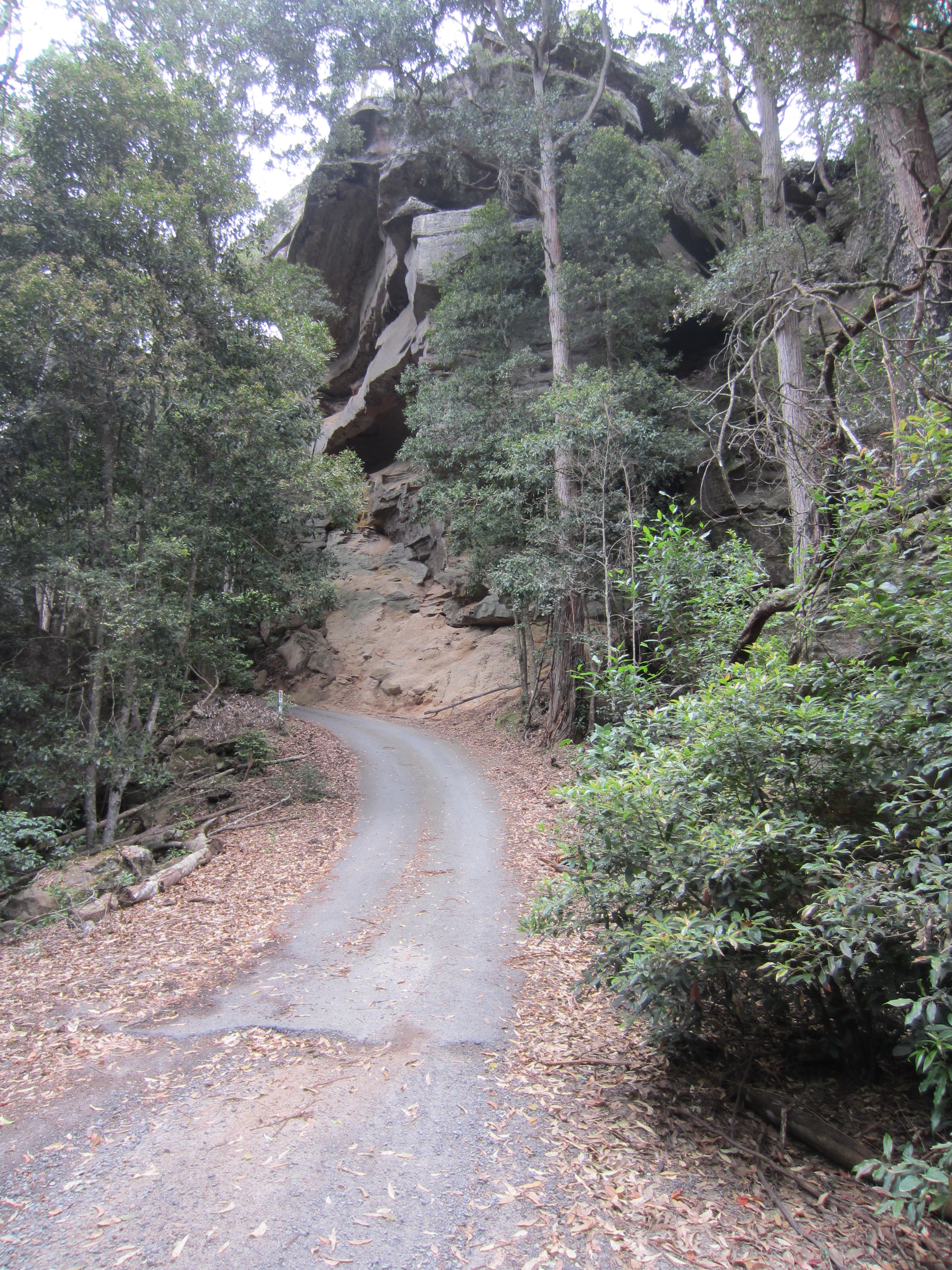
Wandean Gap - The bottom of the first of three steep sidelings on Wandean Road that take it from the Pigeon House Range to the ridge line sloping toward the coast.

The Wool Road (also later known as 'The Old Wool Road') was a historic road in New South Wales, Australia, that ran from Nerriga to what is now called Vincentia on Jervis Bay. It was constructed privately in 1841, using convict labour. Its purpose was to provide a shorter route to a seaport for wool grown at Braidwood and beyond. The historical significance of The Wool Road is that it was the first road, capable of being used by wheeled vehicles, linking the inland area around Braidwood to the South Coast. The road led to the foundation of the privately owned port town of South Huskisson (now known as Vincentia) and the adjacent 'government township' of Huskisson.

The Wool Road's route made its use difficult and the port on Jervis Bay was not a success. In 1856, the original road was realigned and extended to Terara (near Nowra) instead of Jervis Bay, becoming the Braidwood Road. The old route through the coastal escarpment to Jervis Bay fell into disuse for many years.

Much of the original route of The Wool Road—approximately 68 km in length—remains in use today, but some parts are accessible only to four-wheel drive traffic. Only a part of the original route that is currently in use is known as The Wool Road or The Old Wool Road today—the section from the Princes Highway to Vincentia. The remainder of the original route still in use today is made up of a significant part of the Braidwood Road (MR92), Wandean Road, and a short section of the Princes Highway.

== Historical context ==
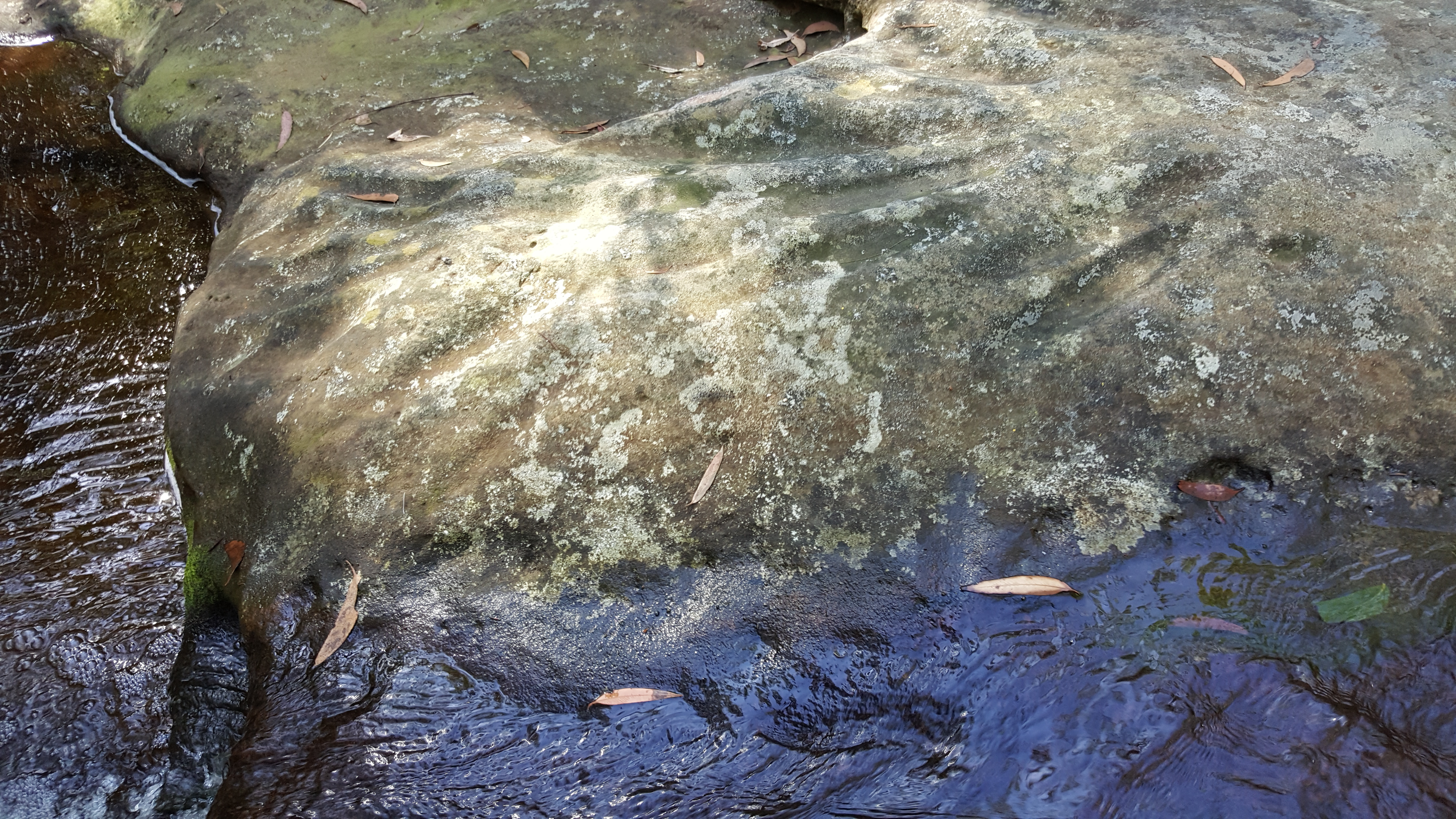
Tool-sharpening groves made by Wandandian people, in sandstone rock nearby the route of The Wool Road, outside Vincentia, N.S.W. (April 2019)

The land between Nerriga and Jervis Bay is part of the country of Wandandian people, a group of Yuin. Wandandian people spoke Dharamba, which was probably the northernmost dialect of the Dhurga language. Traditionally, Wandandian people used paths, from the Pigeon House Range through the area now known as Wandandian, to reach the fishing grounds of St George's Basin and the inland hunting areas of the tablelands. In the 1830s and 1840s, Wandandian people still lived on their traditional lands.

The land also lay within the County of St Vincent, one of the Nineteen Counties in which white settlement was permitted by the colonial government of New South Wales. In the late 1820s and 1830s colonial settlement had spread to the vicinity of Lake George, Braidwood, Yass, the Limestone Plains (now Canberra), and beyond to the Monaro district. The country settled was well-suited for the production of wool, for which there was a booming export market, but lay far from the existing port of Sydney.

The Great South Road originally forked at Marulan, with one route going to Bungonia and the other to Goulburn. This forking was in the—ultimately unfulfilled—hope that there would be a route found through the coastal escarpment via Bungonia, while the path through Goulburn headed in the direction of newly discovered grazing areas around Gunning and Yass.

The route, to Sydney from Braidwood, was via Bungonia and a crossing of the Shoalhaven at Kurraducbidgee (modern-day Larbert).

Transporting the wool bales using the cumbersome bullock drays of the time involved a long and arduous journey from Braidwood—taking around three weeks at the bullocks' slow pace and with their need to stop for rest, feeding and watering—via Bungonia and Marulan to Sydney. The owner of Yarralumla, Terence Murray, further away at the Limestone Plains, complained that, in wet weather, the drays could take as long as three months to reach Sydney. From the early 1830s, there was agitation for a shorter route to the sea.

In the 1830s, a bridle-track known as the Corn Trail was made, from Clyde Mountain to the coastal Buckenbowra Valley. It probably followed a route already used by local Aboriginal people. It was steep and only usable by pack horses. Transport of wool in bales required a road that could be used by bullock drays.

Jervis Bay, a large sheltered bay that was suitable as a deep water port lay far closer than Sydney but there was no road from Braidwood toward the coast beyond Nerriga. From 1831, there were sea-going auxiliary steamships—such as the Sophia Jane—operating in New South Wales but steam powered railways were not in place before the mid-1850s.

Although transportation of convicts to New South Wales had ceased in 1840, it was still a penal colony. Convicts were a workforce that could be put to work on road making.

== Route ==
The endpoints of The Wool Road were the locality of Nerriga—by 1841 already connected to Braidwood by a rudimentary road—and the newly created port of South Huskisson (later known as 'the old township' and today known as Vincentia) on Jervis Bay. The significant geographical obstacles to be overcome were crossing the Endrick River near Nerriga, climbing to a plateau in the northern part of the Pigeon House Range, then avoiding the steep valleys and gorges cut into that plateau by tributaries of the Shoalhaven and Clyde rivers, and subsequently descending from the plateau to the coastal plain to reach Jervis Bay.

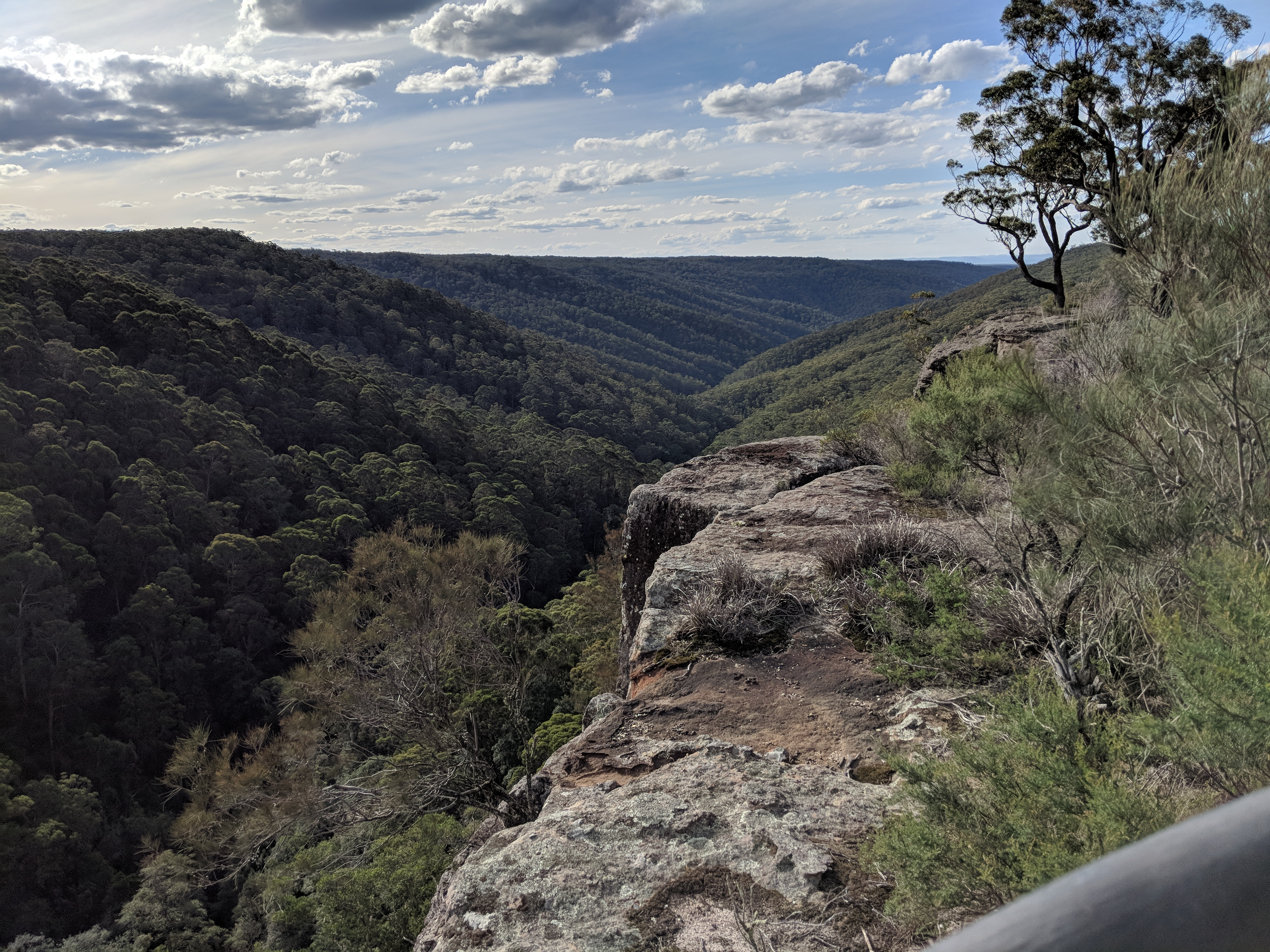
The valley of Tianjara Creek, looking north from Tianjara Falls. The Wool Road passed south of the top of the falls to avoid this valley and the nearby valley of the Clyde River.

After fording the Endrick River, The Wool Road broadly followed the direction of the modern-day Braidwood Road (MR92), from Nerriga to near the Boolijah Peak, a point east of Sassafras. The current Braidwood Road alignment is the result of an upgrade in 1856. The original 1841 road's exact route was different in some places, most significantly where it climbs the Pigeon House Range at Bulee Mountain near Nerriga. The 1841 road traversed the ridge to the north of Bulee Mountain and went through the man-made Bulee Gap, whereas the 1856 alignment and the current road pass to the south of Bulee Mountain

Following the line of the modern Braidwood Road, the road crested the Pigeon House Range, at a location known as Billy's Hill. It then passed over the narrow part of the plateau not cut by the impassable gorges of Ettrema Creek and Bainbrig Creek. It continued past Sassafras and the Tianjara Falls, through another narrow part of the plateau, between the impassable valleys of Tianjara Creek and the most upstream parts of the Clyde River.

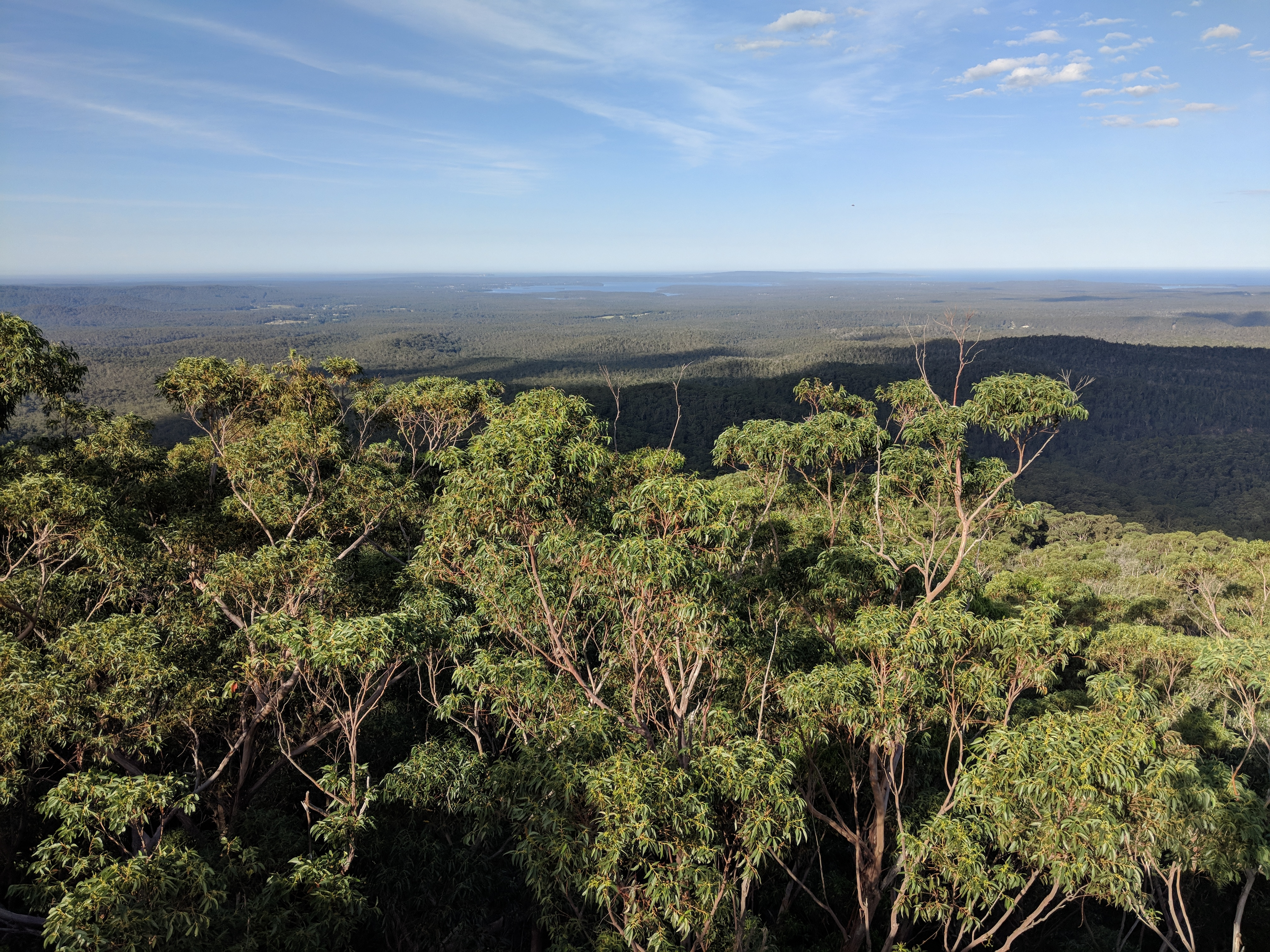
View from Jerrawangala lookout atop the coastal escarpment approx. 500m south of Wandean Gap. St George's Basin is visible in the centre and beyond it, to its left, in the far distance, is Jervis Bay.

From near the Boolijah Peak, The Wool Road diverged from the current route of the Braidwood Road and followed the route of modern-day Wandean Road, through the steep Wandean Gap. (historically also known as the Jerrawangala Gap), then following ridgelines of tributaries of Wandandian Creek, to Wandandian. In this section, the road's elevation dropped by approximately 2,500 feet in 10 miles (760m in 16 km), as it descended the coastal escarpment, via the locality of Jerrawangala and Wandandian. Most of this part of the route is now only accessible to four-wheel drive traffic.

From Wandandian, The Wool Road followed the route of a previous foot track—already in existence by 1841 and probably of Aboriginal origin—to Jervis Bay. Its route followed the approximate line of the existing Princes Highway for a short distance (skirting north of Wandandian Creek), then broadly followed the direction of the modern road still known as 'The Wool Road', from the modern-day Princes Highway near Basin View, via St George's Basin to Vincentia. At St. George's Basin, the 1841 route followed the road now known as 'The Old Wool Road' where it deviates from a section of the modern-day The Wool Road that was constructed around 1929. The Wool Road ended at a port on Jervis Bay that is now Vincentia.

== History ==
=== Finding the route ===
In 1831, Robert Futter of Bungonia and George Galbraith of Nerriga formed an expedition to find a path from Nerriga to Jervis Bay. The others making up the expedition were William Ryrie, James Holman—who was known as the 'Blind Traveller'—and two Aboriginal guides whose names are not known.

Holman later recounted—in his book ‘A Voyage Round The World: Including Travels In Africa, Asia, Australia, America Etc. From 1827 - 1832' , published in 1834-1835 —that the route they had taken from Yerock Flat (west of Sassafras Mountain) to the coast was taken against the advice of the Aboriginal guides, who had strongly suggested following the range further to the north. Holman later recognised that had they done so they could have found a far easier route for a road to Jervis Bay (such as that of the longer but less steep Turpentine Road). However, the explorers had passed through rugged and difficult country and, having reached Jervis Bay via what was apparently the shortest route, did not search for any longer but easier route.

In 1839, the owner of Yarralumla, Terence Aubrey Murray, also explored a route between Nerriga and Jervis Bay, which may have been similar to that followed by the Futter expedition.

=== Proponents ===
After at first failing to obtain government funding for such a road in 1839, landholders from around Braidwood and Nerriga decided to fund and build their own road from Nerriga to Jervis Bay. The principal advocates and financial backers for the new road were John Mackenzie of Nerriga and Dr. Thomas Braidwood Wilson of Braidwood. Others on the committee advocating the road were landholders Terence Aubrey Murray and the Ryrie family (William Ryrie, his brother Stewart Ryrie Jr, and their father Stewart Ryrie). Wealthy and influential colonists Alexander Berry, Robert Campbell, Thomas Walker and James Macarthur were also supporters of the new road.

Edward Deas Thompson—at the time the Colonial Secretary of New South Wales—was a backer of the road, but also stood to benefit from its construction. He owned 2,560 acres of otherwise useless land on the western shore of Jervis Bay south of Moona Moona Creek, Thompson had been attempting to dispose of this land as late as August 1839 but it was not suitable for agriculture. Explorer and surveyor, John Oxley, had said of the land on the western shore, in 1819, "We saw no place on which even a Cabbage might be planted with a prospect of success" and that "perhaps a more miserable sterile Country was never traversed by man". However, an east-facing point—now known as Plantation Point—provided shelter from the south and a safe port—the 'Inner Harbour'—and there was enough land on which a port township could be situated.

=== Survey ===
The route of the new road was surveyed by a government surveyor, James Larmer, who delivered his final report on the route in August 1840. Larmer advocated the same basic route followed by the Futter and Murray expeditions and—apparently in ignorance—dismissed any route descending to the coast further north than his surveyed line. His report reads, "In conclusion I beg to add that on so great an extent of Road less obstructions and difficulties in the formation could not be met on any other line of Road of the same extent in the Colony—and from enquiries I have made both from whites and Aboriginals and from my own observations I am fully convinced that it would be impossible to discover a more practicable line than the one now Surveyed. On the North it is a bold and continuous range but totally unfit for Drays to pass down to the Coast—and on the South numerous deep rocky gullies that are impassable."

=== Construction ===
Seventy convicts were assigned to Nerriga landowner John Mackenzie, under the command of Captain John Coghill, in February 1841, and work commenced. In June 1841, another fourteen men, to work on the road, arrived at the new port of South Huskisson aboard the steamer Tamar. The Bulee Gap was created by blasting away a narrow neck of sandstone rock to bring the road onto the plateau of the Pigeon House Range. Blasting was also needed to create a pass for the descent through the Wandean Gap. The Wool Road covered a distance of approximately 37 miles (60 km) and it was built at an estimated cost of £997. As the road neared completion, the road gang became a nuisance at the Jervis Bay end of the road; a report stated that, "Scenes of debauchery and violence are of daily occurrence, there being no magistrate or constable to control them."

The road from Nerriga to Jervis Bay, The Wool Road, was completed in October 1841.

=== Connecting road to the Braidwood district ===
In 1842, an existing primitive track linking Nerriga to Arnprior—the Ryrie family's property, in the Braidwood district, at what was then known as Kurraducbidgee, now Larbert—was substantially upgraded, also using convict labour assigned to John Mackenzie. Arnprior was already linked to the township of Braidwood via the road that carried traffic from that town to Bungonia—and ultimately to Sydney—which crossed the Shoalhaven River, near the Arnprior homestead. The road, from Braidwood to Nerriga, was a government 'parish road', created under an act of the Governor and Council. By late 1842, there was a road capable of taking wheeled traffic to Jervis Bay from Braidwood and beyond.

=== Heyday ===
==== South Huskisson—a port on Jervis Bay ====
As the roadwork neared completion there was optimism about the future. In June 1841, it was predicted that, with the completion of the road to Kurraducbidgee (Arnprior), "at least half the wool now exported from Sydney, will in a few years be shipped at Jervis Bay"

The first cargo of wool from Nerriga was carried over The Wool Road and loaded at South Huskisson in late 1841; it was sent from Nerriga by John Mackenzie, who also shipped his wheat crop using the port in 1842. At first, the drays were taken to the beach and the wool bales and other cargo were carried out on small boats to a waiting ship but, after a company was formed to do so—in March 1842—a wharf was built during late 1842. The auxiliary steamship Sophia Jane made her first trip to the port of South Huskisson in June 1841 and provided a monthly and at times twice monthly service between the port and Sydney. The barque Cygnet visited the port in December 1842 to load a cargo of wool for London.

The town of South Huskisson grew around the port, located on land granted in 1830 to Edward Deas Thompson. A wool store capable of storing 2,000 bales of wool and an inn were built. At least 200 building allotments in the private township were sold during 1841, at high prices on an assumption of the success of the road and port, and in anticipation of large future capital gains. The total of the prices of the 100 allotments sold in June 1841 was £3,519.

A 'government township' was also surveyed to the north of Moona Moona Creek, which became Huskisson. Allotments were sold in Huskisson in February 1843.

==== Planned roadside townships ====
Five 'townships' were planned along road from Braidwood to Jervis Bay. Two of these, Larbert and Marlow, were to be between Braidwood and Nerriga; Larbert was at the Shoalhaven crossing, near the Arnprior homestead and Marlow was to be at the crossing of the Mongalowe River. The settlement to be known as 'Narriga' was to be located at the road's crossing point on the Endrick River, some distance further east and at a lower elevation than the modern-day village of Nerriga. Tianjara was to be near Tianjara Falls. Farnham was to be at 'Jerrawongola' (Jerrawangala), near Wandandian Creek, after the descent to the coastal plain (in a part of the modern day Parish of Farnham). In addition, it seems that reserves were envisaged at other points along the road, where the bullock teams could be rested.

=== Difficulties and decline ===
Sydney wool merchants and shipping interests, and businesses along the road to Sydney, were opposed to the road and the new port. Soon after the road opened, in January 1842, an anonymous report of difficulties using it appeared, which included a prediction that, "it is doubtful if ever it will be completed and when finished, a constant thoroughfare to the sea coast; inasmuch as the route is chiefly barren scrub, and badly watered." A year later, in January 1843, an article in the Sydney Morning Herald stated that, "The township, the wharf, and the road, have all still to contend against the evil reports which have been so industriously circulated respecting them by interested parties". There was some factual basis for such negative views.

Geographic and economic difficulties affected The Wool Road and these, rather than the 'evil reports', caused it to fall into disuse after a relatively short time.

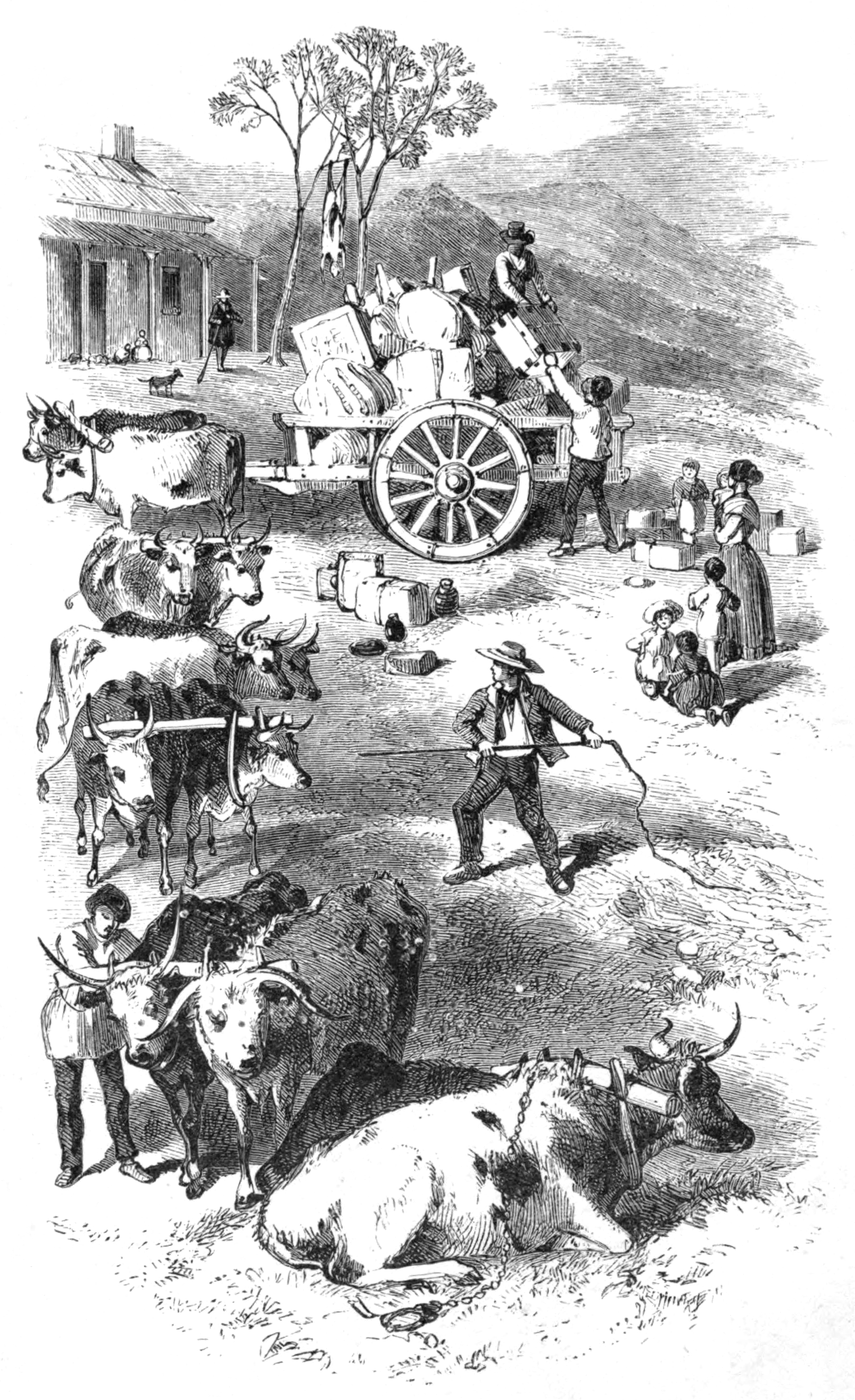
Bullock dray, similar to those used in the early days of The Wool Road, with the bullock team being unhitched in pairs (c.1853).

The steep descent proved a problem for the cumbersome bullock drays of the day. Although the distance was short, the slowness of the fully laden bullock drays descending the steep route led to ships being delayed at Jervis Bay and on at least one occasion leaving without taking on a cargo there. With hindsight, the route of The Wool Road via the Wandean Gap had been a poor choice; far better routes for roads over the coastal escarpment would be found later.

The truth about the road—and the country through which it ran—was very much contrary to the apparently exaggerated claims that had been made, when town allotments in South Huskisson had been sold for high prices in 1841. The country atop the Pidgeon House Range was infertile land that was unsuitable to provide grazing for the bullock teams, with the exception of the natural clearing at Yerock (or Yarrock) Flat—known as 'McKenzie's Paddock'—and the nearby area of volcanic soil around Sassafras. Fodder had to be carried. Water was also limited. The planned villages along the route did not eventuate, although at least one map was still showing them in 1907. The wharf at South Huskisson, although viable, was small when compared to the numerous wharves of Sydney Harbour.

The Wool Road was used for wool grown around Nerriga and Braidwood but it proved to be impractical for those places further away, like Yarralumla and the Monaro beyond. As a result, some of those who had supported the building of the road, such as Terence Aubrey Murray, did not use it once it was completed. In late 1843, it was advertised that wool could be shipped to Sydney from the new port of Boydtown on Twofold Bay. Although in time the port of Boydtown too would be a failure, it was in competition for wool cargoes with the port of South Huskisson, and it lay much closer by land to the Monaro. The absence of wool cargoes from the outer areas meant that the volume of wool shipped via The Wool Road and its port was much less than had been expected.

In 1842, after the road was completed, Terence Aubrey Murray and others, including Major William Sandys Elrington and Captain William Oldrey, attempted to raise subscription funding for a rival private road, from Bellalaba to the port of Broulee, that was not built. Such a road would have connected the area south of Braidwood, and perhaps as far away as Queanbeyan and the Limestone Plains, to a rival seaport on the coast.

The road needed regular maintenance work and repair, especially after wet weather, to keep it open. Money became short when New South Wales entered an economic depression in the 1840s. The causes of the depression were complex; it was probably triggered by a lengthy drought in the period 1839–1841.—which reduced wool production—followed by falls in the prices of wool and sheep, and was exacerbated by the cessation of convict transportation in 1840—the assignment of new convicts to private service ended on 21 July 1841—which created a shortage of low-cost labour, at a time when landholders and business people had significant debts. In 1842, there were numerous insolvencies and in 1843 some bank failures.

Being privately owned, the port and The Wool Road received no assistance from the government. By June 1842, some of the people who had subscribed to fund the building of the road could not meet their commitments to pay costs already incurred in its construction. A petition was made in October 1843 to recoup from the government a quarter of the £2400 in debts that had been incurred to build the road and quay to that date. This may indicate that the backers of the road and port were already in financial difficulty.

Two main backers of the road and port, John Mackenzie of Nerriga and Dr. Thomas Wilson of Braidwood, were ruined financially as a result of the 1840s depression, Wilson died in November 1843—probably by his own hand—leaving debts of £15,264 with a deficiency of £14,439, colossal sums at that time. Mackenzie was bankrupt in 1849, and all his land at Nerriga was sold in 1851. By 1853, he was reduced to asking permission to live in a house in South Huskisson belonging to Edward Deas Thompson.

It had been envisaged that wool would be exported direct to England from the port at South Huskisson but the port more typically was serviced by coastal steamers. Any wool carried by these steamers needed to be transshipped for export at Sydney. Shipping operators were only interested in servicing Jervis Bay, if the trade was profitable. By late 1843, some woolgrowers had found that the coastal sea freight costs were too high to justify using Jervis Bay, and were again taking their wool by bullock dray over the land route to Sydney,

The first wool auction in Sydney was held by T.S. Mort in 1843 Soon afterwards, Samuel Lyons and other Sydney auctioneers also entered the wool auction business, and the practice rapidly became widespread. The introduction of the wool auction system—and the better prices that could be obtained—had the result of increasing the dominance of Sydney as the export port for wool, because the wool had to be sent first to Sydney to be auctioned.

The Sophia Jane was still calling at Jervis Bay in early June 1844 but in mid-June it went only as far as Wollongong, and after that seems to have been on the run to Morpeth. Although small coastal ships still visited the port, the days of South Huskisson as a major port had ended and no more wool was loaded there after December 1843.

The steep part of The Wool Road, passing through the Wandean Gap and on to Wandandian, fell into disuse and became overgrown in parts, as early as 1848. In 1854, the road to Jervis Bay—The Wool Road—was described as being in a state of "total abandonment".

The last portion of the road from Wandandian to South Huskisson (now Vincentia) seemed to remain in local use but only in parts, as private roads and tracks across private land.

The decline of the port town was rapid. South Huskisson was described by a visitor in 1851 as a "village on a small scale". and of its buildings it was said that "some of them still stand". The town allotments in the private township of South Huskisson—and the nearby 'government town' of Huskisson—essentially had become worthless, by the mid-1850s. By 1867, South Huskisson was deserted—any buildings were just ruins by 1885—and, by the early 1930s, all that remained of 'the old township' was a solitary Norfolk Island pine.

== Realignment and alternative routes ==
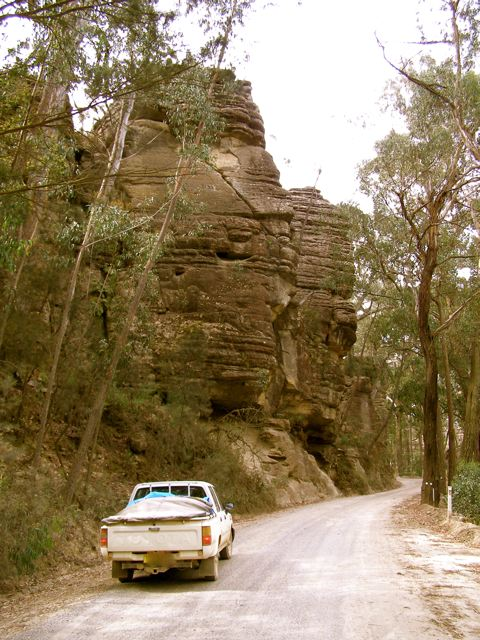
Braidwood Road (1856 route) ascending the escarpment east of Nerriga, in 2006, prior to its upgrading to modern highway standard. The cliff face shown survives, alongside the upgraded road. This location is just a little west of where the 1856 and 1841 routes merged at Bulee Gap.

The discovery of gold in the Braidwood (Major's Creek, Jembaicumbene and Mongarlowe), Araluen and Nerriga areas in the early 1850s provided an impetus for better roads to the coast.

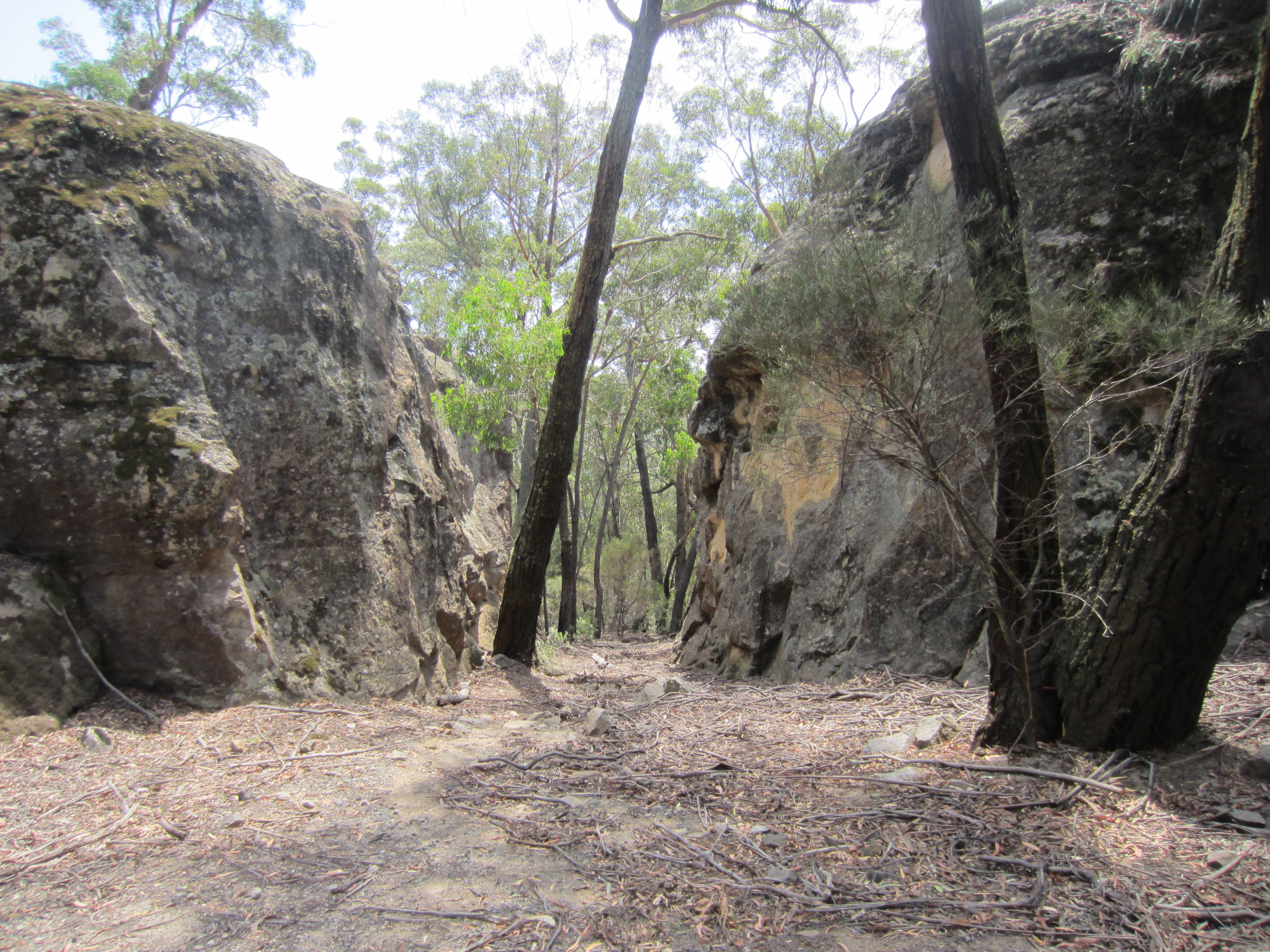
Bulee Gap—Man-made cutting viewed from where the 1841 route merged with the 1856 road. (February 2019).

In 1856, The Wool Road was realigned—based on a new survey by George Legge—to bypass the steep Bulee Gap section and continued, as a new branch off the original 1841 route, via Nowra Hill to a wharf at Terara—just east of modern-day Nowra—on the tidal part of the Shoalhaven River. The new road included a bridge across the Endrick River and its elevation decreased gradually from Sassafrass to Nowra. This 1856 government road became the modern day Braidwood Road (MR92). It was capable of being used by bullock drays and wagons. Wool, in loads of between 24 and 50 bales, was transported over it to Nowra until the early years of the 20th century. In fact, it seems that the first wool drays used the new route to the Shoalhaven, in early 1855, when nine teams took wool belonging to William Ryrie, from Arnprior, Larbert, to Greenwall Point, where there had been a wharf since 1829.

From the line of the new Braidwood Road, another new road—built in the late 1860s and known as 'the Turpentine Road'—branched eastward to Tomerong. It still provides a much gentler gradient to Jervis Bay, on a route to the north of the older and steeper 1841 Wool Road that passed through the Wandean Gap.

The Clyde Road—first used in early 1858 and later a part of the King's Highway—was built from Braidwood, via Clyde Mountain and following a line surveyed by Sir Thomas Mitchell in 1855, to the Clyde River at Nelligen, which became a port. Another road to the coast—the Araluen Road—was built from Araluen to Moruya, in 1867–1868.

The Main Southern railway line and other rail lines were constructed in the second half of the 19th century, confining bullock drays to transporting wool from outlying areas to the new railheads, particularly Goulburn (after 1869) from where the wool could be carried quickly to Sydney. Before the railway was extended beyond Goulburn, the town had sixty carriers delivering to the railhead. In 1893, the South Coast railway line reached Bomaderry, just north of Nowra, providing a second railhead.

A section of the original The Wool Road from Nerriga that passed through the Bulee Gap cutting was bypassed by the 1856 route but it remained in use as an alternative stock route to the corresponding part to the newer Braidwood Road. During the Second World War, a part of this section of the original road was deliberately destroyed using explosives, to limit access by an enemy to the inland area and the national capital, Canberra.

== Legacy and remnants ==
One surviving section of the original 1841 Wool Road is located just north of the existing Braidwood Road (MR92), near to the Bulee Gap, east of Nerriga. The man-made Bulee Gap cutting—bypassed by the 1856 route—and the surviving sections of original road passing through it, are remnants of the 1841 convict-built road. (A part of the original road immediately north of the Bulee Gap cutting was deliberately and thoroughly destroyed during WWII.) The existing Braidwood Road (MR92), east of Bulee Gap, largely follows the original 1841 route of The Wool Road but the section of the current road west of the Bullee Gap largely follows the 1856 realignment.

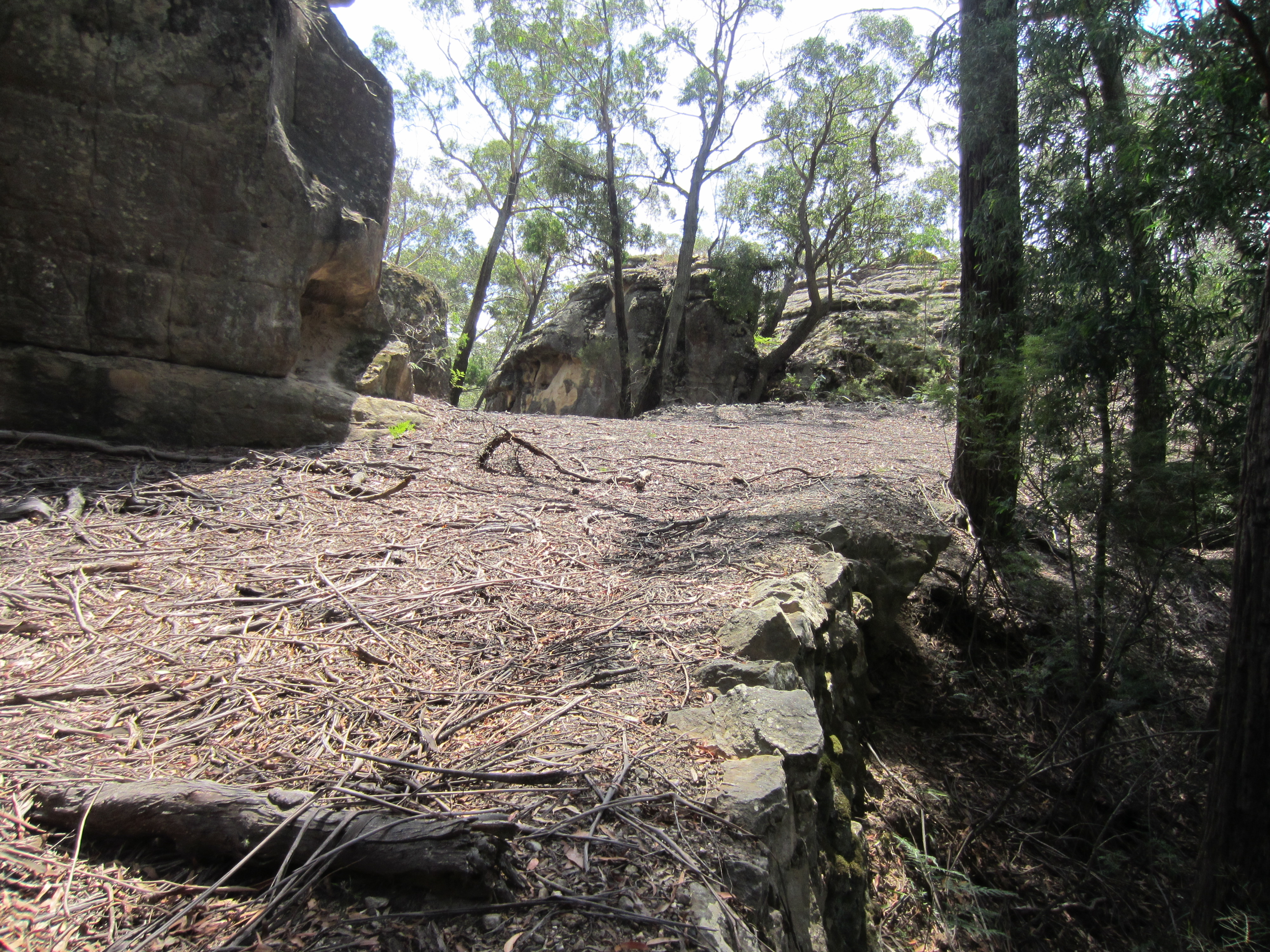
Braidwood Road (1856 route). Preserved section of 1856 road near where it merged with the older (1841) Wool Road that emerged from the Bulee Gap cutting (shown in the centre background). Note dry stone wall embankment. (February 2019)

When assessed in 2002, the Braidwood Road west of the Bulee Gap showed some remnants of the 1856 roadworks and was an example of road making from the immediate post-convict period, before the formation of the Department of Public Works in 1859. Drill marks were visible in the sandstone outcrops where they have been cut by the road makers. Dry stone retaining walls were evident, some of which had been compromised by modern road grading. Between 2007 and 2010, the Braidwood Road was sealed and upgraded to modern highway standard at a cost of $99-million, including major work where the road climbs from the Endrick River and passes the Bulee Gap The work in that area included removing bends, cutting back the cliff faces, installing high retaining walls and building a four-span concrete bridge structure. The route of the modern road over the bridge structure preserved sandstone landforms and a part of the 1856 road's formation, including a dry stone walled embankment and the junction with the older 1841 route at the south end of the Bulee Gap cutting.

The last portion of the road to South Huskisson (now Vincentia) was reopened as a public road around 1911-12 and that involved the resumption of some private land—land being used at the time as 'private road' or 'private track'—to do so (South Huskisson—now Vincentia—was, at that time, still a 'private town'). The modern road is known as The Wool Road and is a largely straight road. To the south of the modern Wool Road—starting at Island Point Road and following a more circuitous route south of Cockrow Creek—is 'The Old Wool Road' and connecting it to the modern day The Wool Road is 'Wool Lane' . Where it exists, this 'Old Wool Road' is closer to the route of the original road than the corresponding section of the modern straighter road. Historically, the end of The Wool Road was where it entered the town of South Huskisson, from where the streets of the town led to a wharf on Jervis Bay; the modern day road known as The Wool Road now ends at a roundabout intersecting Elizabeth Drive and Burton Street, Vincentia, near the shore of Jervis Bay. Some hewn sandstone blocks from the 1842 wharf are visible at low tide near the Holden Street boat ramp Many street names from "The Old Township" are still in use in Vincentia today and much of the original street plan remains. The 'government town' north of Moona Moona Creek, which was surveyed at the same time as "the Old Township", grew from the early 1860s onwards to become modern-day Huskisson.

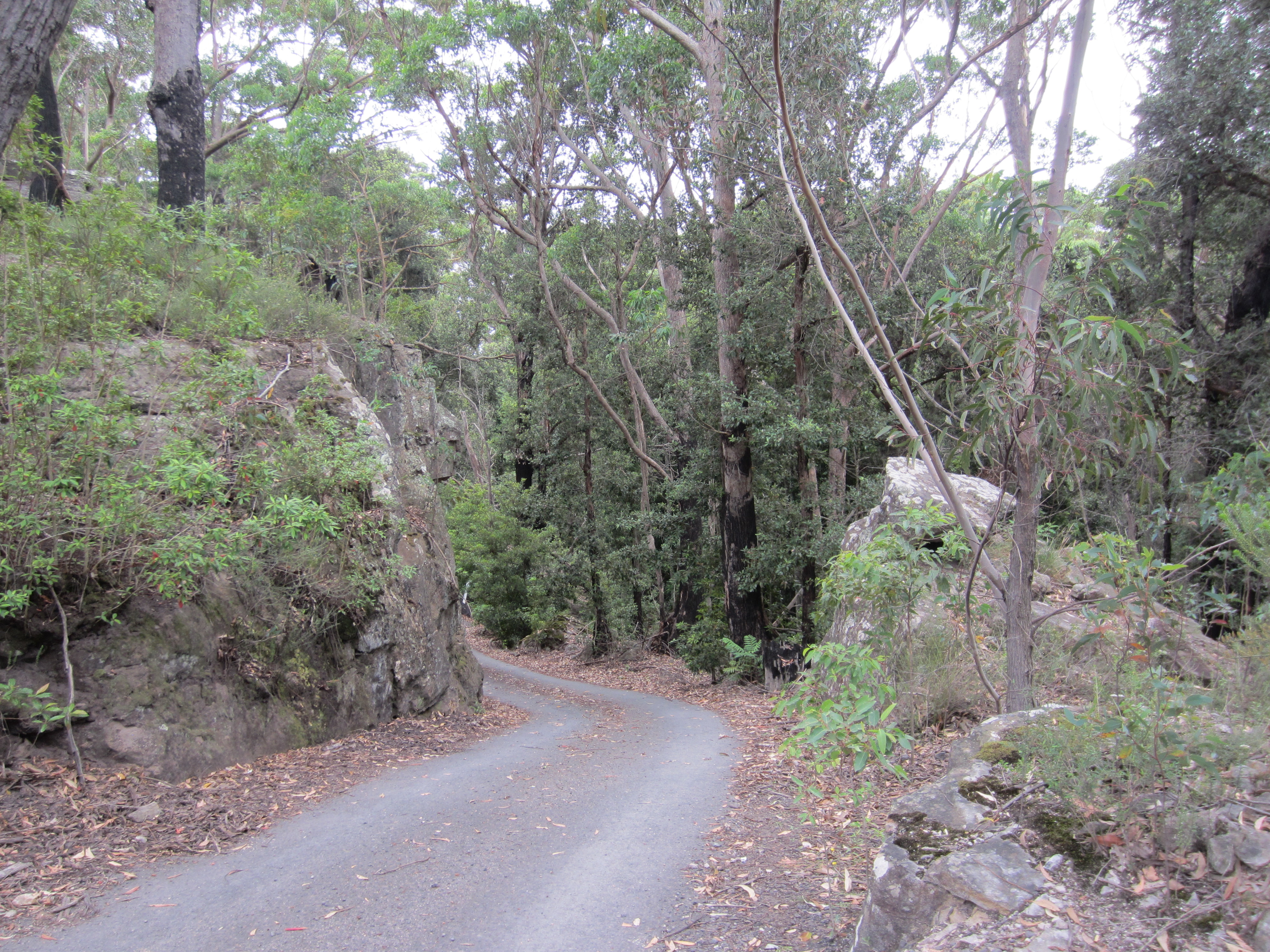
Wandean Gap—Wandean Road (1841 Wool Road) at the start of the steep descent.(February 2019)

There is a lookout known as the Jerrawangala Lookout and to reach it visitors turn off Braidwood Road and pass over part of the 1841 route, along the first part of modern-day Wandean Road. The 1841 route of The Wool Road passes through the Wandean Gap approximately 500m to the north from the location of the modern day lookout. The elevation of the lookout demonstrates the folly of building a road through the escarpment at this location. Drill marks in the rocks at Wandean Gap are remnants of the construction of The Wool Road in 1841.

The little used road through the Wandean Gap to Wandandian (Wandean Road) still exists; most of it is single-lane and unsealed and much of it is unsuitable for general traffic. Adventurous drivers using four wheel drive vehicles can still use this route.

== See also ==
- King's Highway (an alternative route to the coast built in the 1850s)
- Great North Road (another convict-built road in New South Wales)
- Oxley Highway (originally a convict-built road for transporting wool from Walcha to the coast at Port Macquarie)
