= Stewart Ryrie Jr =

Scottish-born Australian pastoralist, surveyor, and settler colonist (1812–1882)

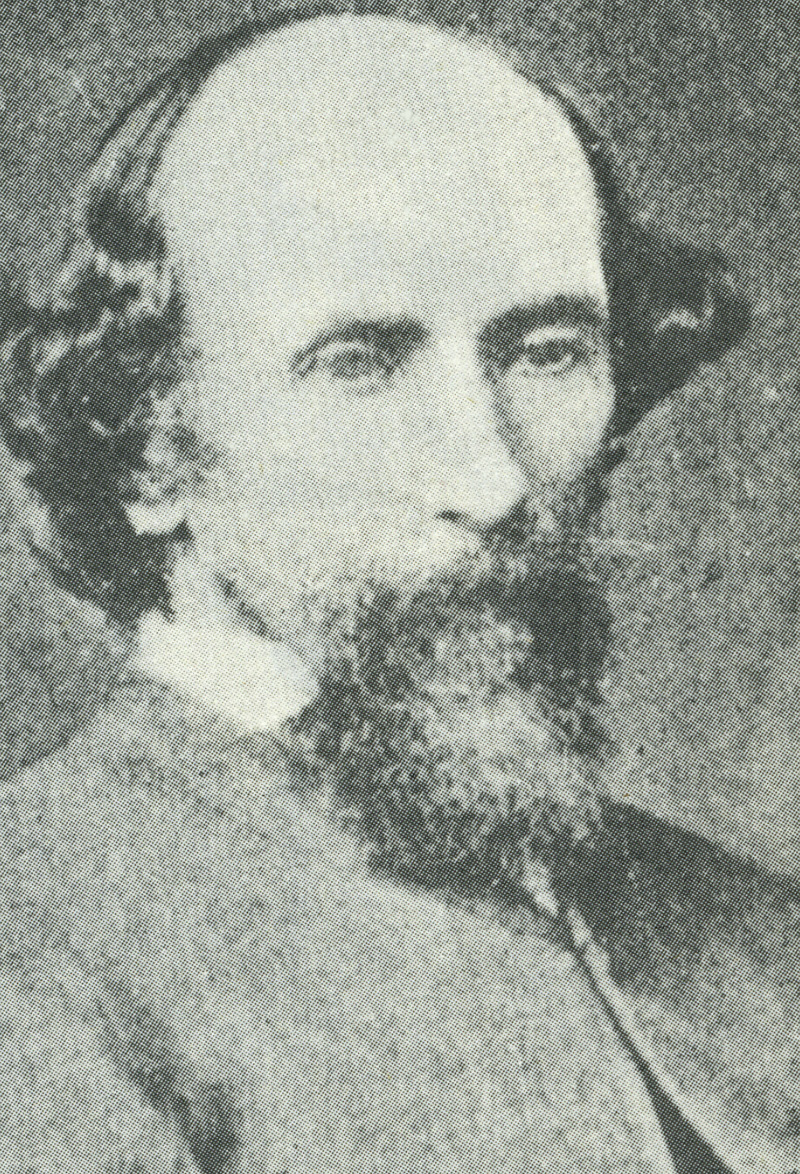
- Stewart Ryrie Jr, c. 1850
- Born: 1812; Thurso, Caithness, Scotland
- Died: 16 October 1882 (aged 69–70); Wee Jasper, New South Wales
- Occupations: Pastoralist, surveyor
- Spouse: Janet Ryrie née Mackenzie
- Children: 3 sons and 4 daughters
- Father: Stewart Ryrie

Stewart Ryrie Jr (1812–1882) was a Scottish-born Australian pastoralist, surveyor and settler colonist of the Monaro district of New South Wales, Australia. He is associated with early colonial settlement of the Cooma and Jindabyne areas, and the exploration and survey of the Snowy Mountains.

== Early life and family background ==
Stewart Ryrie Jr was the fifth child of Stewart Ryrie (1778–1852) and his first wife Anne, née Stewart. He was born in 1812, at Thurso, Caithness, Scotland. He came to Australia in 1825, as a free settler, with his father, the new Deputy Commissary General, and the rest of his immediate family. His eldest brother was William Ryrie (1805–1856). Alexander Ryrie (1827–1909), David Ryrie (1829–1893), and John Ryrie (1826–1900) were his Australian-born half-siblings.

In 1830, his father moved to reside on his eldest son William's land grant, 'Arnprior', at Larbert. Ryrie was also living on that family landholding, near Braidwood, from around the same time. His brother James had a land grant nearby, at Durran Durra.

== Exploration ==
Ryrie was one of the first settlers to explore and survey what is now known as the Snowy Mountains and the adjoining area that is now part of East Gippsland in Victoria. In December 1839, Deputy Surveyor-General, Samuel Augustus Perry, asked Ryrie to make a 'comprehensive examination of country which has not yet come under regular survey’. Ryrie made four journeys, during which he drew topographical views of the mountain ranges, some in ink but most in pencil. Ryrie was remunerated for this work, but apparently was not employed on the staff of the Surveyor-General's Department.

On 15 February 1840, his party crossed the Crackenback River and climbed the Ramshead Range, to where Kosciuszko Chalet stands today, at Charlottes Pass. He recorded in his diary that, 'on gaining the summit saw one of the highest points covered with snow to be distant to North West about three or four miles, but finding it too late to reach that point, turned S.W.’. Ryrie was one of the first settlers to sight Mount Kosciuszko—the highest point in mainland Australia—from so near, but missed the opportunity to reach its summit, some weeks before Count Strzelecki ascended and named the mountain, on 5 March 1840.

In April 1840, Ryrie, accompanied by an Aboriginal guide and three soldiers, came across Buchan Caves, in the course of a survey of the area. He entered one of the caves, on 7 April 1840—possibly the one now known as 'the Garage'—and was the first settler to see and describe the caves.

== Landholder ==
His father, Stewart Ryrie, was insolvent in March 1844, with a deficiency of £7,861 10s. 5d., a large amount at that time. His father's squatting run in the Monaro, 'Coolringdon', officially changed ownership around this time. In 1845, Stewart Ryrie Jr was managing 'Coolringdon' on behalf of a new owner, Dr Francis Lascelles Wallace, who was Stewart Ryrie's son-in-law. So, it seems that irrespective of the nominal ownership of 'Coolrington', it remained within the Ryrie family.

By 1848, Ryrie had two large sheep runs of his own, 'Cootalandra' 7,600 acres, and 'Jindabine East', 13,000 acres, both taken from Ngarigo people, the traditional owners, and held by payment of a licence fee to the colonial government. 'Jindabine East' lay on the left (eastern) bank of the Snowy River, east of the original site of the village of Jindabyne.

In 1851, Ryrie bought another run in the Monaro identified as 'Bullumbulling', probably 'Bullembalong'. By the late 1850s, his brother, Donald Ryrie (1810–1888), also seems to have been residing in the Jindabyne area, remaining there until his death. Ryrie sold most of his land at Jindabyne, in 1865, to a Mr Throsby, and he sold 'Bullembalong' to William Jardine, who soon afterwards sold it to Ryrie's brother, Donald. Ryrie retained 187 acres on the river bank, and he continued to reside in the Monaro region until 1873.

== Flour mill at Jindabyne ==
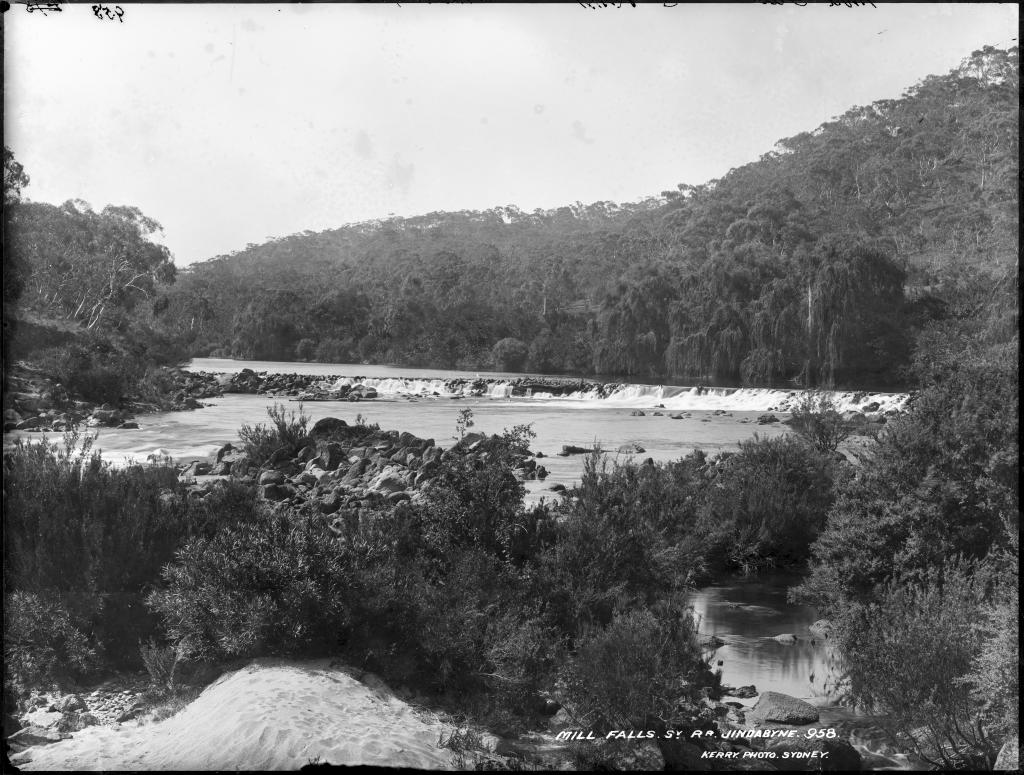
'Mill falls' on Snowy River at Jindabyne.

In 1847, Ryrie built a flour mill at Jindabyne, which was powered by a water wheel. It was the first mill in the area, and one of the older mills in New South Wales. For many years, it was operated by William Jardine (1819–1904). The mill was located on Mill Creek, a tributary of the Snowy River. The water that drove the waterwheel was diverted, from upstream on the Snowy River itself, using a low weir that provided about ten feet of water head. The waterwheel was described as 'immense' and made use of a large volume of water available from the swiftly flowing river. The mill building was solidly built, with stone walls and hardwood floors. It was the first machinery to extract energy from the waters of the Snowy River, which would later be harnessed as part of the Snowy Mountains Scheme.

Not much wheat was grown in the Monaro, due to its cold climate. However, local growers supplied the mill using two frost-resistant, cool-climate, wheat varieties, 'White Lammas' and 'Red Lammas', which had been grown successfully in the British Isles and North America. Wheat was grown at Jindabyne and on the flats at Berridale.

The mill served the local market in the Monaro region. It continued working, until the railway arrived at Cooma—around 1889—bringing with it cheaper flour. The disused mill survived, until it was destroyed by fire c. 1916.

== Family, later life, and death ==
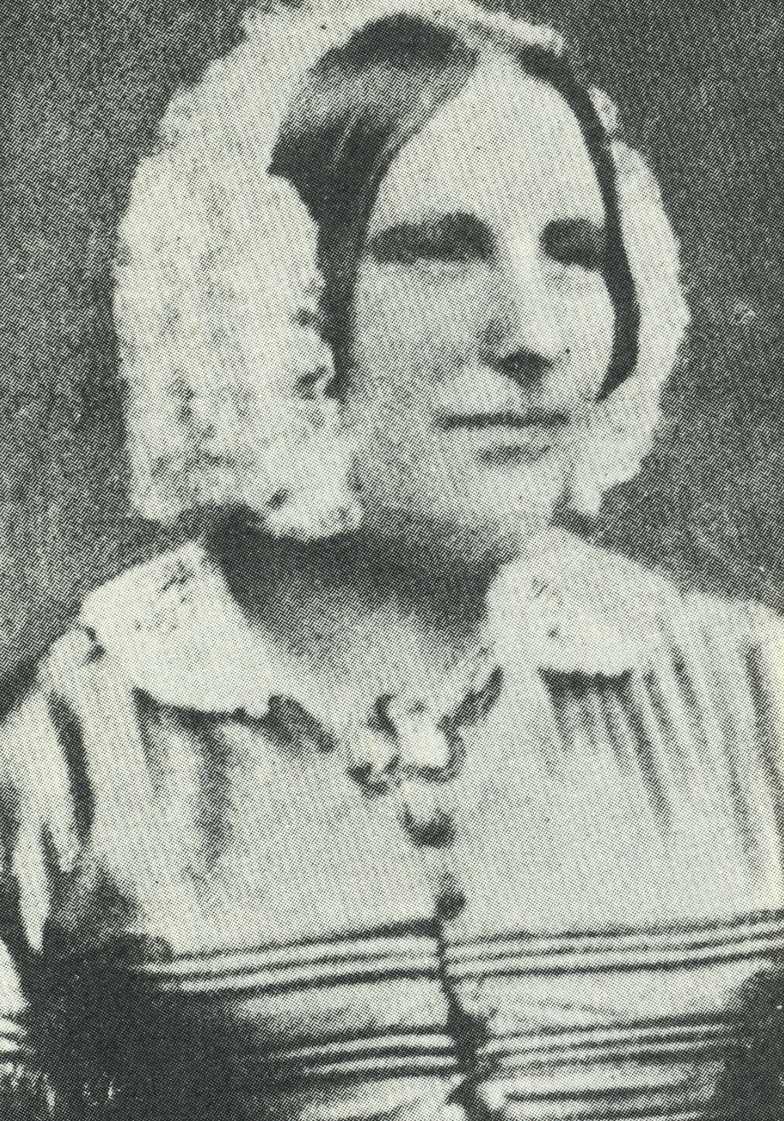
Janet Ryrie c. 1850

He married Janet Mackenzie (1822–1893), the daughter of John Mackenzie (1791–1857) and his wife, Charlotte (née Solomon), at Nerriga on 26 April 1845. They had three sons and four daughters. Their eldest child was Charlotte Ryrie (1846–1913). Their eldest son, who was born at 'Coolrington', was also named Stewart Ryrie (Stewart Mackenzie Ryrie, 1848–1933). Their second daughter was Amy Anne Lilias Ryrie (c.1857—1934). Their third daughter was Alice Ryrie (1859–1942), who became a surgical nurse. Their youngest daughter was Emma Lucy Ryrie (d. 1915).

In 1871, Ryrie bought a property of 40,000 acres (16,188 ha) known as 'Coodra Vale', on the Goodradigbee River—then also known as the 'Little River'— in the area now known as Wee Jasper, near Yass. He moved there in 1873. His mother-in-law, Charlotte Mackenzie, died there in 1875. 'Coodra Vale' was later the home—from 1908 until 1912—of renowned Australian bush-poet, A.B. 'Banjo' Paterson.

Ryrie died at his home, 'Coodra Vale', on 16 October 1882. His wife Janet died at Stanmore, in 1893.

Much of the land that Ryrie once occupied, at Jindabyne, and the site of his flour mill and wier, now lies below the waters of Lake Jindabyne. The remaining part of the stream, on which the mill at Jindabyne was situated, is still called Mill Creek. A sketchbook, in which he made twenty-one drawings of the mountains in 1840, is held in the collection of the State Library of New South Wales.
