= William Ryrie =

Scottish-born Australian pastoralist

William Ryrie (1805–1856) was a Scottish-born Australian pastoralist and pioneer settler colonist of the Braidwood district of New South Wales and the Port Phillip District (now Victoria).

== Early life ==
William Ryrie was the eldest son of Stewart Ryrie (1778–1852) and his first wife Ann Stewart. He was born on 9 February 1805, at Thurso, Caithness, Scotland. He came to Australia in 1825, as a free settler, with his father, the new Deputy Commissary General, and the rest of his immediate family. His deceased mother, Anne, was the sister of William Stewart (1769–1854), who until 1827, was Lieutenant-Governor of New South Wales, under Governor Ralph Darling.

One of his younger brothers was Stewart Ryrie Jr, who settled at Jindabyne. Alexander Ryrie, David Ryrie and John Ryrie were his Australian-born half-siblings.

== Work ==
In 1827, William took up a land grant at Larbert in the Braidwood district, which was named Arnprior, after the childhood home of his father's second wife, Isabella Cassels. The grant took over part of the traditional land of Walbanga people, a group of Yuin. By 1833, the Ryrie family were working Arnprior with convict labour. William seems to have jointly managed Arnprior, with his father, who had retired and come to live there in 1829. His younger brother James was granted land at the adjacent locality of Durran Durra. James died in 1840 and his landholding and Arnprior were consolidated.

The Ryrie family were among the proponents and financial backers of The Wool Road. William Ryrie had been a member of the exploration party that had first identified a possible route for that road, from Nerriga to Jervis Bay, in 1831.

The Ryrie family attempted, unsuccessfully, to dispose of Arnprior, in 1844, possibly in relation to Stewart Ryrie's insolvency. However, well before then, William Ryrie had turned his attention to the settlement opportunities of the Port Phillip District. It may have been that William just wanted to concentrate his efforts on his newer land holdings.

William Ryrie was among the earliest settlers of Port Phillip to take an overland route from New South Wales and migrate south from there rather than from Tasmania. In 1837, William, with a party including his younger brothers James and Donald, drove livestock from Arnprior to Yering, near Melbourne. His holding there was known as Yering Station and, in January 1840, it was the site of the Battle of Yering, an armed conflict between Wurundjeri clansmen and troopers of the Border Police of New South Wales.

Ryrie planted, in 1838, what is regarded the first commercial vineyard—0.4 hectares in area—in the Port Phillip District, at Yering. The first vines planted were brought from Arnprior and were later supplemented by cuttings from James Macarthur's Camden Park Estate. Yering's first wines, a red and a white, were made in March 1845. Ryrie's Yering landholding was purchased in 1850 by Paul de Castella, who greatly expanded the vineyards, from the 1850s onward, and is widely regarded as the father of the wine industry in the Yarra Valley region. Despite the impact of phylloxera and decline of the wine industry in the early 20th century, wine is once again produced at Yering Station.

=== Magisterial career ===
Ryrie was appointed as a magistrate in Melbourne in 1840, but earlier in the same year had been involved in a duel there, with Peter Snodgrass.

Ryrie became a prominent citizen on the new colony of Victoria, which separated from New South Wales in July 1851. He was an early member of the Melbourne Club and a founding trustee of the Scot's Church.

== Personal life ==
William Ryrie married his step-mother's younger sister, Marianne Campbell Cassels, in 1845. The marriage took place at what had, by then, become his father's house, Arnprior, at Larbert. William and Marianne had two daughters, Helen and Anne, and one son, John.

=== Death ===
William Ryrie died on 21 July 1856, while visiting Scotland. His wife Marianne died at her home at Burwood, in June 1876.

=== Legacy ===
Ryrie Street, in Braidwood, is named after him, but Ryrie Park is named after his half-brother Alexander Ryrie. Ryrie Street, a major thoroughfare in Geelong, is almost certainly named after him.

== See also ==
- Arnprior (Larbert)
- Larbert, New South Wales
- Stewart Ryrie Jr
- Alexander Ryrie
- David Ryrie
- Foundation of Melbourne
