= John Mackenzie (colonial settler) =

British military officer (1791–1857)

Lieutenant Colonel John Kenneth Mackenzie (1791–1857)—also spelt 'McKenzie' or 'MacKenzie'—was a military officer who fought in the Peninsula War and the War of 1812, and a pioneer colonial settler of New South Wales, Australia. He is a particularly associated with Nerriga, Braidwood, and The Wool Road, but also with Dangelong, in the Monaro region.

== Early life and family background ==
Mackenzie was born, in 1791, at Edinburgh, Scotland. Some sources say that he was born in 1793, but that is inconsistent with his death in 1857, aged 66.

His father was Andrew Mackenzie, W. S., a 'writer'—the equivalent of a solicitor in the Scottish legal profession of the time—and his grandfather was Kenneth Mackenzie, Professor of Law, at the University of Edinburgh. His mother was Janet (née Campbell), a daughter of James Goodlat Campbell (1731—1803), 4th (and last) of Auchlyne (a cadet branch of Clan Campbell).

His father died, in 1793, and Mackenzie became an orphan at an early age. He did not follow family precedent and enter the legal profession, instead becoming a soldier, at sixteen years of age, in 1807.

The spelling of his surname varies between sources—even on his marriage certificate it is spelt in two different ways—but, Mackenzie himself and his descendants used 'Mackenzie'.

== Military career ==
He joined the 4th or King's Own Regiment, in April 1807, as an ensign. In August of the same year, he went with the regiment on the military expedition to Copenhagen, and in 1808 to Gothenburg, with Sir John Moore's aborted military expedition to assist Sweden.

He fought in the Peninsula War and later in the War of 1812, during which he was wounded at the Battle of Bladensburg. At various times he was stationed in France—with the army of occupation—the West Indies and Portugal. From around 1818, he received a number of promotions, culminating in his appointment as a Lieutenant Colonel in early 1832.

== Settler in New South Wales ==
He arrived Sydney in August 1832, aboard the Clyde, to take command of a detachment of his regiment, the 4th (The King's Own) Regiment of Foot. As well as Mackenzie, his family, and his headquarters staff, the same ship carried 199 male convicts to the colony. This was just one of a number of ships that brought convicts, together with the soldiers of the King's Own who were guarding them.

In 1833, he became a shareholder in the Bank of New South Wales. In 1834, he sold his commission. He lived for some years in the district around Liverpool, and was a justice-of-the-peace in that district. His home in the area was known as 'Glenfield Park', which previously had been the home of Charles Throsby, and which Mackenzie apparently rented.

His association with Nerriga began when he took up land, near to the Endrick River, which was granted to him in June 1836. Mackenzie's land grant had originally been given to another settler, Dr Henry Douglass. Douglass unwisely had become involved in the political manoeuvres of the colony, and he had been forced to leave the colony—temporarily it transpired—by Governor Darling. Mackenzie was the beneficiary of Douglass's departure, after Douglass's land grant was cancelled, in his absence, by Darling. The area was then called 'Narriga' after a property there, owned by George Galbraith. In 1838 and 1839, Mackenzie bought more land in the area—including Galbraith's property, 'Narriga'—bringing his total landholdings there to 4,541 acres. He and his family appear to have moved permanently to Nerriga only in mid-1841.

Mackenzie was also as a pioneer of the Monaro region, where he occupied land taken from Ngarigo people, as a squatter. However, he and his family seem to have moved directly from Liverpool to Nerriga. Mackenzie took up 'Dangelong' station, a vast squatting run of 44 square miles (11,396 hectares), in the Monaro region near Cooma, but chose to reside with his family on the land that he owned at Nerriga. He began a grazing operation at Dandelong, which had twenty-six residents and ten slab huts, by 1839. Mackenzie also had, for a time, another run 'Summer Hill', near Nimmitabel.

Mackenzie became a close associate of the founder of Braidwood, the nearest town to Nerriga, Thomas Braidwood Wilson. Mackenzie and Wilson are notable as being among the main proponents and financial backers of The Wool Road and the new port of South Huskisson (now Vincentia). It was Mackenzie's wool clip that was the first to be loaded onto a ship at the port, in late 1841. He also loaded his wheat crop there in 1842.

Once construction of The Wool Road was completed, Mackenzie took up land at Yarrook, along the new road, just to the west of modern-day Sassafras, becoming probably the first settler landholder in the area. The land was an area of natural grassland, where Mackenzie established stockyards and grazing. His holding is known to the present day as 'McKenzie's Paddock'.

In 1843, Mackenzie was appointed as a councillor on the District Council for Braidwood and Broulee. In 1838, he became a Police Magistrate, at Braidwood, although in that judicial role he attracted serious criticism and controversy; it appears that he ran his courtroom, in an idiosyncratic and authoritarian manner, with regard neither for the rights of defendants nor the freedom of the press.

== Later life, family and death ==
Mackenzie was ruined financially, in the aftermath of the economic depression of the early 1840s, no doubt complicated by the failure of the privately-owned Wool Road and the port of South Huskisson. William Bradley took over the lease on his squatting run 'Dandelong', in 1848. He was bankrupted in May 1849, and consequently lost all his land at Nerriga; his home there was put up for sale in 1851 and, by 1854, other parts of his land there were for sale. In 1853, he was reduced to asking permission to live in a house in South Huskisson that belonged to Edward Deas Thompson. He was described as being, at this stage of his life, "the aged and destitute veteran".

Mackenzie married Charlotte Solomon on 15 May 1815 at Halifax, Nova Scotia, Canada. They had six daughters and eight sons. Of their fourteen children, one was born in France, one in Grenada, seven in the United Kingdom, and five in New South Wales.

One of his sons was Major General Hugh Mackenzie (c.1829—1893). His eldest son, Andrew Mackenzie (1818—1878), owned 'Moelly', a 220.1-acre farm, on the coastal plain, at Jerrawangala. Andrew was well-educated and was reported to have expertise in the area of Aboriginal language; perhaps he was familiar with the dialect spoken in the area, by Wandandian people, a group of the Yuin. One of Mackenzies's sons—probably Andrew—had managed 'Dangelong', during the time that it was controlled by Mackenzie.

Mackenzie's female descendants were members of important pastoral families, in New South Wales and Victoria. Mackenzie's daughter, Janet, married Stewart Ryrie Jr, a pioneer settler of Jindabyne. Another daughter, Ann (known as Annie), married Arthur Blomfield—son of another Peninsula War veteran and colonial landholder, Thomas Valentine Blomfield—at Denham Court in 1856, and then lived near Cooma. His eldest daughter, Elizabeth, married Alured Tasker Faunce, a Captain of the 4th Regiment, later a controversial colonial magistrate and a pioneer settler of Queanbeyan. Elizabeth's daughter, Charlotte Faunce, married Alexander Ryrie and was the mother of Major General Sir Granville Ryrie. Elizabeth's daughter, Ellen Faunce, married David Ryrie. His third daughter, Mary, never married and lived to just short of her 102nd birthday. Most of his descendants lived in the Monaro, Shoalhaven, Southern Highlands, and Yass districts of New South Wales.

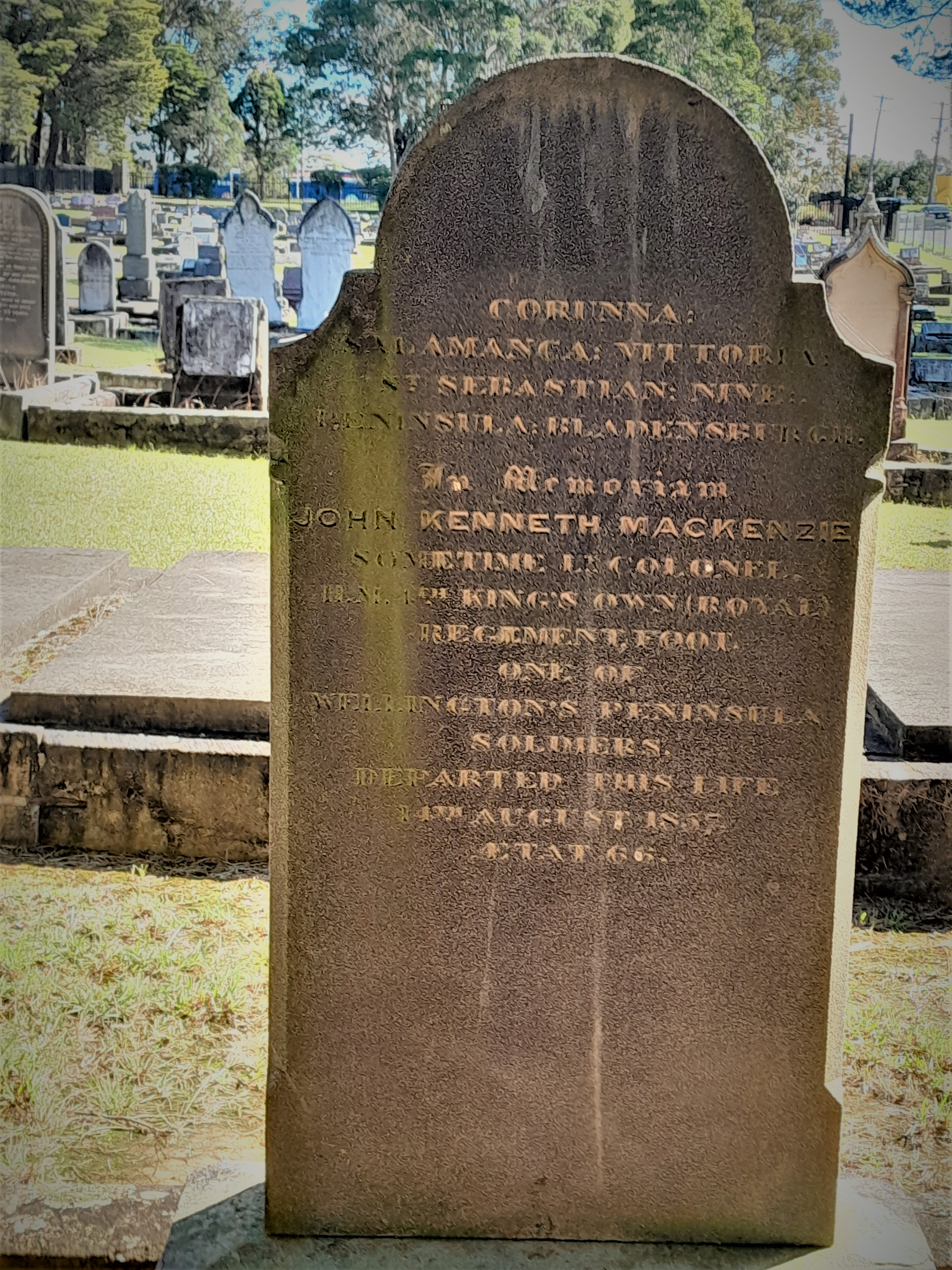
Memorial to Mackenzie in Nowra Cemetery.

Mackenzie died of a heart attack, while either visiting or living at his elder son's property, 'Moelle' (or 'Moelly'), and he was buried there. There is a memorial erected to his memory in the cemetery at Nowra. with an inscription reading: "Corunna : Salamanca : Vittoria : St. Sebastian : Nive : Peninsula : Blenkensburgh [sic]. In memoriam, John Kenneth Mackenzie, sometime Lt.-Colonel H.M.4th King's Own Royal Regiment Foot. One of Wellington's Peninsula soldiers. Departed this life 14th August,1857. Aetat 66." His wife Charlotte died at 'Coodra Vale', the home of her daughter Janet and son-in-law Stewart Ryrie Jr, at Wee Jasper, near Yass, in 1875.

Mackenzie had worked his land using convict labour, and those same convicts had been put to work building The Wool Road, along with others—totally around seventy—who were assigned to him for road construction. Mackenzie had a reputation as a harsh master. One of his assigned convicts, Cornelius Flynn, bore on his back the scars of harsh corporal punishments carried out on Mackenzie's orders. After one such flogging, Flynn swore an oath that one day he would dance on Mackenzie's grave. Years later—by then he was a free man and landowner—it is said that he waited until after Mackenzie's funeral service and, with the grave freshly filled and heaped, he then fulfilled his oath while singing a ditty that was offensive to Mackenzie's memory.

Alongside Mackenzie's memorial in the Nowra cemetery, is the grave of his eldest son, Andrew Mackenzie (1818—1878). As well as his farm 'Moelly', Andrew's property—at the time of his death—included some town allotments at North Huskisson (now known as Huskisson) and 32 acres near the never-built village of Farnham that lay on his father's Wool Road near Wandandian Creek. In the 1860s and into the early 1870's, Andrew was a prominent citizen of the area around Tomerong, albeit one subjected to some public mockery by his opponents. Yet, despite his lands and his wealthy grazier sibling relatives, Andrew Mackenzie died, in August 1878, intestate and apparently in a state of near starvation, at North Huskisson. The finding at his inquest was that he died four days after he had a fit—perhaps a stroke—and had fallen unconscious into a fireplace, where parts of his body received very serious burns. His last occupation, around 1875, seems to have been as the postmaster of North Huskisson, and just prior to his death he was living in a hut there. After his death, the disposal of Andrew's estate was managed by a younger brother, Robert Stewart Mackenzie (1838—1913). However, Andrew's legacy, the legacy of his mother Charlotte (d.1875), and the legacies of three of Andrew Mackenzie's deceased siblings—Caroline (d.1860), Charlotte (d.1863), and James (d. 1869)—were the subject of a High Court judgement (Mackenzie vs. Faunce), in favour of another brother, who was living in England, Hugh Mackenzie, in 1879.

The old Mackenzie homestead building at Nerriga was still standing in 1988.
