= Parish of Larbert =

Civil parish in Australia

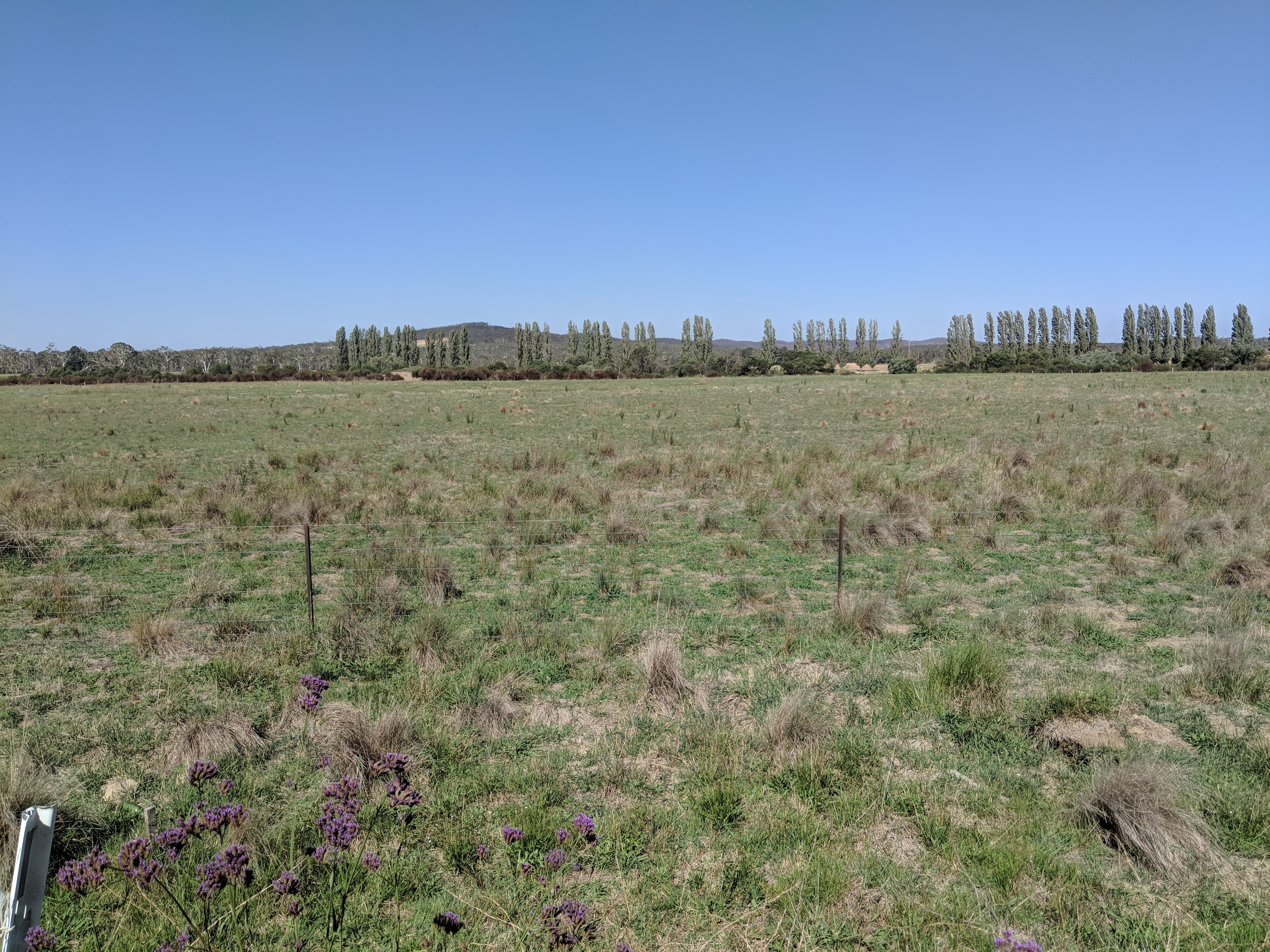
Larbert

Larbert Parish is a civil parish of Murray County, New South Wales.

Larbert is located at 35.248333°S 149.784444°E on the Shoalhaven River and to the east of the Kings Highway. It is halfway between Ulladulla and Canberra. It includes most of the locality of Larbert.
