= James Larmer =

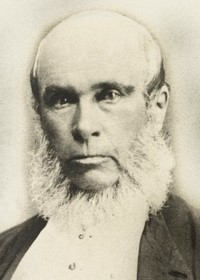
James Larmer in the 1880s (cropped version of an image from the SLNSW).

James Larmer (b. 1808 or 1809 – d. 1886) was a government surveyor in the colony of New South Wales. Between 1830 and 1859, he surveyed land, roads and settlements in New South Wales. He was an Assistant Surveyor to the Surveyor-General, Sir Thomas Mitchell, from 1835 to 1855. In 1835, he was second in command of Mitchell's second expedition. He is also noteworthy for his recording of Aboriginal words from various parts of New South Wales.

== Early life ==
Larmer was born in Reigate, Surrey, England and arrived in Sydney in October 1829 to take up his appointment as a survey draftsman. Title deed information, from his time in Australia, shows his full name as James Gulley Larmer.

== Career ==
Between 1830 and early 1835, James Larmer surveyed land, roads, streets, coastlines, creeks, rivers, and ridges in what is now greater Sydney, in nearby areas including Broke and Branxton in the Hunter, Brooklyn, Mangrove Creek, Broken Bay and Pittwater around the Hawkesbury River, and in more distant parts including the Abercrombie, Campbells, Belubela, Bell, and Macquarie Rivers.

During 1835, Larmer was second-in-command of Thomas Mitchell's second expedition, which attempted to follow the Darling River downstream to its confluence with the Murray. Larmer, in command of the main party, left Parramatta and met Mitchell at Boree, east-northeast of modern-day Cudal. The expedition first went overland, followed by the Bogan River, and then the Darling from the location of modern-day Bourke. While near the Bogan, the expedition's botanist, Richard Cunningham, went off searching for plants and became lost. It was Larmer who led a party that searched for him for a number of days, finding his dead horse and other evidence of his likely demise. Larmer produced a map sketch showing Cunningham's probable route.

The expedition stopped to the north of the Menindee Lakes, due to the risk of attack by hostile Aborigines, falling short of their objective—but in no doubt that the Darling continued to the Murray—and then retraced their route to return. The connection of the Murray and the Darling, would be confirmed for settler colonists, in 1844, when Charles Sturt's third expedition, following a river upstream from its confluence with the Murray, reached the site of Mitchell's last camp.

During the return journey, the expedition separated into two parts on the Bogan, east of modern-day Girilambone; Mitchell continued moving upstream on Bogan River, and Larmer lead a group to survey Duck Creek, a little to the north of what became Canonba. The groups were reunited at modern-day Buddabadah, near modern-day Nyngan.

In 1837, Larmer had reserved a village site for Ulladulla. In 1837, he laid out the town plan of Bungendore, in 1838 Queanbeyan, and, in 1839, the town plans of Broulee and Braidwood.

In 1840, he surveyed the route of The Wool Road. By this time, he had settled in the Braidwood area, and lived out his life as a prominent citizen. Larmer bought land in Braidwood, in 1843, had constructed the Royal Hotel building but was not the licensee of the hotel. In 1841, he reserved the site for a village at Currowan, although the plan of the village, in 1844, was the work of his surveyor colleague and explorer, the ill-fated Edmund Kennedy. In 1840, he reserved the site for a village of Elrington, named after William Sandys Elrington, which would later be better known as Majors Creek.

Larmer also laid out plans for townships along the road from Braidwood to Jervis Bay (The Wool Road). Some of these towns never eventuated at all, and others were not built in the form planned by Larmer. His plan for Larbert would prove disastrously inept, after the site was inundated by the Shoalhaven River flood of July 1853. However, his mistakes at Larbert had no malicious intent, because Larmer himself had bought three lots within the Larbert township site, in 1843.

An economic depression in the early 1840s led to government cost cutting, with surveyors’ salaries being reduced by a third. In recognition of this sacrifice, these government surveyors were allowed to do some private work. In 1844, Larmer was appointed as the Licensed Surveyor for the County of Murray and Commissioner for Crown Lands for the same area.

In 1847, Larmer's plan of the village of Gundaroo was gazetted and — as a Commissioner for Crown Lands — he identified people who were squatting, without authority, on crown lands along the Yass River downstream of that village. In 1849, he designed the plan of the village of Murringo and, In 1851, he surveyed a road from that new village to the Burrangong Station (near modern-day Young).

The town of Gundagai was gazetted, in 1838, but it was soon obvious—after the floods of 1844 and 1852—that much of the original town site was subject to inundation. In 1845, Larmer was surveying new town allotments on the higher ground of the original town. In the eyes of some, he was held responsible for the original plan of the first town on the flood-prone river flats; he definitely drew up plans of town allotments in Gundagai in 1841. In 1850, Larmer laid out plans for extensions to the separate settlement areas of 'South Gundagai' and 'North Gundagai', to allow residents to be relocated and overcome the problem of flooding on the river flats. Also in 1850, he made provision for a village site, on the Lachlan River at what would later become the town of Narrandera. In 1851, he surveyed the site of the Roman Catholic church and presbytery in Jugiong. He also laid out cemeteries at Yass and Goulburn,

In 1852–1853, Larmer was working on surveying the route of a road from Braidwood to Broulee, which was planned to run via Araluen to the Moruya River. Such a road was not completed until the late 1860s. Instead, the major road to the coast was the Clyde Road (modern-day Kings Highway), which opened in 1858.

In 1858, a surveyor Larmer laid out the plan of the gold-mining village of Majors Creek but James Larmer's name was already on the list of those receiving government pensions by October 1857. Majors Creek was the work of his nephew, who was also a surveyor. James Larmer's last field notes date from 1859, and it appears that he retired completely from surveying around that time.

Larmer became a Justice of the Peace at Braidwood in 1859. With other JPs, he presided over cases in the town's Police Court, until 1885. His cases included some involving relatives and associates of the notorious Clarke brothers and other bushrangers, who were members of the Clarke-Connell extended family. He was one of the magistrates who, in 1866, committed John Clarke (Senior)—father of the Clarke brothers—for trial for the murder of an Aboriginal man, Billy Noonang. In May 1867, Thomas and John Clarke, the surviving members of their gang, were remanded, at the Police Court in Braidwood, for trial in Sydney. However, it was Larmer's colleague, John William Bunn, who was the magistrate who committed them for trial, although Larmer, possibly, may have been present.

In 1860, Larmer was proposed as a candidate for the Braidwood electoral district at the 1860 elections, but he did not stand for election.

== Aboriginal languages vocabulary ==
The Surveyor-General, Thomas Mitchell, had directed that, where possible, the existing names, in the local Aboriginal language, should be used as the official names of localities and landforms in New South Wales, which then also included what is now Victoria and Queensland. This was for pragmatic reasons, rather than stemming from any wish to preserve native cultures; in his journal, Mitchell wrote that, "‘The great convenience of using native names is obvious … so long as any of the Aborigines can be found in the neighbourhood … future travellers may verify my map. Whereas new names are of no use in this respect". Consequently, the surveyors of the colony were among those few settlers who took an interest in local languages. They were also working in places where the local people were still living on their traditional lands and speaking their own languages and dialects.

Larmer recorded Aboriginal words and the areas in which these words were used. His work, collated as “James Larmer’s Vocabulary of Native Names” (1853), is one source for fragments of the vocabulary of lost and endangered Aboriginal languages. It is based on his earlier hand-written notes, some dating back to the early 1830s. His lists include words from the Darkinyung, Awabakal, Wiradjuri and Eora languages, and the Dhurga language dialects spoken by the Yuin peoples around Batemans Bay and Ulladulla. There is a list of the Aboriginal language names for the land features and localities of Port Jackson.

== Legacy ==
Although Larmer recorded and thus preserved something of Aboriginal culture, his work as a surveyor was essential in furthering the colonisation of Aboriginal lands. Most significantly, by marking boundaries—defining leasehold and freehold landholdings—and officially assigning titles to settlers, Larmer and the other surveyors were legitimising—at least under the colonial laws of his time—the dispossessing of the land's Aboriginal inhabitants; it was the first step in the process of extinguishing what would much later—in 1992—be recognised as Native Title over those pieces of land.

From July 1837 to end June 1840, in just three years of his lengthy surveying career, Larmer alone had surveyed 160,443 acres, out of a total of 875,089 acres of land that was surveyed and so taken from its traditional owners. The best land for cropping, grazing, and other agricultural purposes was also the most bountiful land for Aboriginal food sources. The alienation and clearing of their traditional lands and the loss of natural flora and fauna had an enormous impact on the original inhabitants; it effectively forced them onto Crown Lands, Aboriginal reserves, the lands of other Aboriginal peoples, or to the margins of the new settlements, and so caused the disruption or end of their culture and traditional way of life.

The Georgian-influenced grid-type town plans, of Bungendore, Queanbeyan, and Braidwood, are Larmer's work. He is commemorated in the various 'Larmer' street names, in places in New South Wales such as Broulee, Bungendore, Howlong, Jugiong, Majors Creek, Narraweena, Nerrandera, and Sanctuary Point.

The road to Jervis Bay that he surveyed in 1840, The Wool Road, was a failure and rapidly fell into disuse, until it was realigned and rerouted to Nowra in 1856; much of the modern Braidwood Road still follows Larmer's survey.

His hotel building in Braidwood is now used as the Braidwood Museum.

== Family ==
James Larmer married, Martha Stoyles, widow of the licensee of the Royal Hotel, Braidwood, in 1861. They had two daughters, as well as the five daughters and three sons of Martha's first marriage.

His younger brother, William Larmer, migrated to Australia in 1853. William was an early pharmacist in Sydney, president of the Pharmaceutical Society, and member of the Pharmacy Board of New South Wales, who after 1865 also became involved in homeopathy.

Larmer's nephew, W.E. Larmer, was also a surveyor in New South Wales from 1854, leading on occasion to confusion about the two surveyors. He is responsible for laying out the town plan of Majors Creek and for surveying the route of a road linking the Braidwood district to Goulburn (modern-day Goulburn Road)

== Death ==
James Larmer died on 5 June 1886, aged 77 years. At the time of his death, Larmer was believed to be the last surviving member of Mitchell's second expedition. His grave lies in the Braidwood cemetery. His wife Martha died in 1899.
