= Arnprior, Larbert =

Arnprior
- Location within New South Wales Location within Australia
- 35.2859°S 149.7866°E
- Location: Mayfield Road, Larbert, Queanbeyan-Palerang Region, New South Wales, Australia

History
- Built: 1827–

Site notes
- Owner: Water NSW

New South Wales Heritage Register
- Official name: Arnprior; Arnprior - Welcome Reef Dam
- Type: state heritage (built)
- Designated: 18 November 1999
- Reference no.: 1357
- Type: Homestead Complex
- Category: Farming and Grazing
- Builders: William Ryrie

Arnprior is a heritage-listed homestead and farm at Mayfield Road, Larbert, in the Southern Tablelands region of New South Wales, Australia. It was built from 1827 by William Ryrie. It was added to the New South Wales State Heritage Register on 18 November 1999.

== History ==
Arnprior has associations with the Ryrie family, dating to the 1820s. Scottish-born Stewart Ryrie (1778–1852) immigrated to Australia in 1825 on board the Triton with his second wife Isabella Ryrie (née Cassels) and the six children from his first marriage. Ryrie's two eldest sons were William (born c. 1805) and James (born c. 1806). Stewart Ryrie had served as a deputy assistant commissary general in the British Army during the Peninsular War in 1808–1815, stationed in Spain and Portugal.

On arrival to Sydney in October 1825, Ryrie took up an appointment as the deputy assistant commissary general, based at the Commissariat Stores at Circular Quay.

On 22 September 1826, William and James Ryrie wrote to the Colonial Secretary Alexander Macleay, stating their intention to "reside on the Land to be granted to us" as they were unable to find suitable work in Sydney. In c. 1827, William Ryrie was granted Portion 4 of the Parish of Larbert in the County of Murray. Ryrie's grant encompassed 2560 acres and was a roughly rectangular parcel of land located to the north of the Shoalhaven River and to the north-east of the Village of Larbert. It appears that Ryrie's grant had earlier been occupied by a William Bradbury.

It appears that Bradbury held a Ticket of Occupation for the land he had been living on at Curraduck-bidgee (Kurraducbidgee) prior to 1826. 'Bradbury's Station' is shown on Robert Hoddle's 1824 map of the Braidwood District, roughly in the vicinity of Ryrie's grant. Bradbury later moved to the Bungonia area.

William Ryrie's land grant was named Arnprior in memory of Isabella Ryrie (née Cassels)'s family home in Scotland.

The 1828 census indicates that a house on William's 2560-acre land grant, Arnprior, was under construction at this time, as was a house on his brother James's grant Durran Durra. The census recorded that there were 18 people living at Arnprior including workforce of eleven (ten of whom were convicts or ex-convicts). It also recorded that there were 35 acres of cleared land and 23 acres cultivated land at Arnprior, compared to one acre cultivated and cleared land at Durran Durra. Arnprior had 553 head of cattle and 1100 sheep, while Durran Durra had 75 cattle and 540 sheep.

The house on William's land holding faced the Shoalhaven River, but was set back from it, possibly because the river was known to regularly flood. Physical inspection of the house suggests that it began modestly (comprising four rooms) and was added to over the nineteenth century to accommodate the extended Ryrie family. The house eventually had thirteen rooms.

Stewart Ryrie retired in 1829. The following year, he arrived at Arnprior to live with his wife Isabella and their three young children: John Cassels (b. 1826), Alexander (b. 1827) and David (b. 1829), and it became the family home. William's younger brothers Donald, then 18 years old, and Stewart, aged 16, also lived at Arnprior.

Another resident at Arnprior in the 1830s was the Greek-born shepherd Ghikas Boulgaris (a.k.a. Jigger Bulgary) who was married to Mary Lyons at the property in 1836. Their two youngest children, Xanthe and Catherine, were born at Arnprior.

In 1837, William Ryrie advised the Governor of New South Wales on the best routes and staging posts for a postal service between Melbourne and Sydney.

In January 1840, the Arnprior land grant was formalised. The 1841 census showed that 48 people were living at Arnprior and Durran Durra in that year. The two properties had been amalgamated following the death of James Ryrie in 1840.

In 1845, William Ryrie travelled to Scotland where he married his step-mother's sister Marianne Cassels. Although he returned to Australia in the interim, William died in Scotland in 1856.

In 1852, Stewart Ryrie Snr died. His second youngest son Alexander managed the property until c. 1859, at which time he moved to the property he had purchased near Canberra named Micalago.

Major floods hit the Braidwood and Queanbeyan districts in August 1853. Hobart newspaper The Courier reported that the "government township of Larbert was ... under water, presenting the appearance of another Gundagai" and that Arnprior was also "surrounded by the flood, but as it stands on higher ground than the opposite side, it escaped destruction".

The house at Arnprior "extended hospitality to the travellers on the track from Goulburn and Bungonia" through to Braidwood, who arrived late at night or were held up by floods at the adjacent ford over the Shoalhaven. In 1853, Samuel Mossman and Thomas Bannister published their account of travelling through NSW and Victoria, at which time they visited Braidwood and Arnprior: "Further on you come to Arnprior, the estate of Mr. Ryrie in the county of Murray, on the Shoalhaven River, about 152 miles from Sydney. Here there is a considerable quantity of land enclosed, but the property is not highly esteemed; gold has been found upon it, however; and we sincerely hope that it will ultimately be of great value to its possessors."

The Ryrie grant was bisected by a road leading directly north from Braidwood to Bungonia. This road passed directly through the Ryrie property, across the ford at Larbert on the Shoalhaven River and another ford on the Boro Creek, passing through Mayfield and alongside Glen D'Or. There is some suggestion that this was a Cobb and Co route. In the south-west portion of the original Arnprior grant lies a road easement leading to Lake Bathurst through Mayfield.

The 1867 Postal Directory recorded that Mrs M. A. Ryrie, Helen, Anne, and John Ryrie were residing at Arnprior. These were the wife and children of William Ryrie. Alexander Ryrie purchased the property from his brother John Cassels in either 1867 or 1876.

By the late nineteenth century, the extended Ryrie family had moved away from Arnprior, to the Monaro district and to Port Philip (Melbourne). In 1902, the property passed out of the Ryrie family when it was sold to Frank M. W. Cooper. He in turn sold to John Welsh in 1906. One of Alexander's sons, Vincent, repurchased Arnprior in 1928. It appears that Vincent Ryrie retained Arnprior until the 1950s, at which time it passed through a number of hands: first it was sold to William Hyde, who sold to J. B. Hibberson, who in turn sold to G. L. Gouge.

In 1968, the Metropolitan Water Sewerage and Drainage Board proposed a scheme, known as the Shoalhaven Scheme, to supply water to Sydney and the South Coast. The proposed Welcome Reef Dam on the upper Shoalhaven River, in the vicinity of Braidwood, was to be part of the second stage of this scheme.

From 1968 through to the mid-1980s, the Water Board set about purchasing privately owned pastoral holdings in the area between Braidwood and Goulburn for the proposed Welcome Reef Dam and catchment area, eventually acquiring 37,000 acres. Arnprior was resumed by the State Government on behalf of the Metropolitan Water Sewerage and Drainage Board at this time.

The boundaries of the original land grant to William Ryrie have altered considerably since c. 1827. Today, the original Arnprior grant has been halved; but it now includes 261 acres of land granted to F. H. R. Martin (Portion 221 of the Parish of Larbert) and part of 80 acres originally owned by John Cassels (Portion 53 in the Parish of Larbert). Arnprior also includes part of the Village of Larbert, namely the church and the cemetery.

== Description ==
The property is accessed from Mayfield Road along a gravel drive. Near to this intersection is the former township of Larbert, and within the Arnprior boundary are the stone foundations of a former church, small cemetery and several mature pine trees. A cottage with attic roof and the ruin of a single-storey structure just outside the Arnprior boundary are also likely to be part of the former township of Larbert.

The homestead of Arnprior is set on a plateau overlooking expansive plains and grazing country to the east and toward the Shoalhaven River, the land gently sloping up to the rear. Directly in front of the residence are the remains of an early orchard, yucca sp. and a grouping of mature radiata pines. Outbuildings and other mature cultural plantings are located to the west and south of the homestead.

The Arnprior property comprises the following elements:

- Homestead (c. 1830)
- Cottage (1970s)
- Outbuildings and cattleyards
- Church footings and cemetery
- Landscaping

Homestead (c. 1830)

Arnprior Homestead is reputed to have been constructed between 1827 and 1830. The earliest parts of the homestead would appear to be the four central rooms located under a double hip roof. This section has timber framed with beaded weatherboard walls and two central rubble stone chimneys. Rubble stone (rendered) additions on either side possibly date from the c. 1840s. Other later additions and alterations, and major internal alterations include wall relining c. 1920s and c. 1980s; and c. 1970s verandah enclosures, kitchen fitout, shower and lavatory facilities within the eastern enclosed verandah. The eastern verandah is enclosed with modern profile steel sheeting and later windows and fibre cement internal linings. The various construction stages are legible in the roof line, as no attempt has been made to consolidate and form one roof. As such the roof is a mixture of double hip, and skillion roof forms, and is clad with corrugated iron, although the original timber shingles to the central double hip roofs remain beneath. In addition to the two central chimneys, two other similar chimneys are located at the northern and southern side of the homestead. The rubble masonry walls have been roughcast externally and plastered internally.

Internally many of the original lath and plaster walls have been lined over in the 1920s or recently removed. The original ceilings of lath and plaster have fallen away and were relined in the 1920s and again in the 1980s. A number of walls have been exposed, and internally the timber stud frame walls show evidence of original lath and plaster as well as early wallpaper coverings. Original floorboards remain. One early cedar chimney piece remains, while other chimney pieces have been either removed or replaced with modern face brick surrounds. There is other evidence of early skirting and dado and picture rails behind later wall linings. A hand carved cedar door architrave remains to the original front door, and features a distinctive thistle motif. All window joinery is later, apart from original but altered window sashes to the weatherboard walls. A cellar is located under the southern 1840s addition to the homestead, and has granite walls, dirt floor and the remains of a lathe and plaster ceiling. Many of the locks are later possibly c. 1920s. Evidence remains of the evolution of the building through its present exposed structure.

The eastern verandah has a later concrete floor covering original stone flags. The original verandah posts have been replaced with steel poles; however, the original verandah beam remains in place.

Stabilisation works including window, roof, drainage, render and other propping works were completed on the building August 1995.

A random rubble wall located in the north-west corner of the homestead relates to a previous wing of the house.

Cottage (1970s)

A small c. 1970s prefabricated cottage is located some 200 m to the south of the homestead. This is a simple timber-framed and weatherboard-clad building that is set on a red brick base, with a gable roof of corrugated iron. Externally the building fabric appears sound, although external paintwork has largely peeled away and roof drainage items are missing.

Internally the cottage comprises several small bedrooms, bathroom, kitchen and open lounge/dining area. The interior appears to be undergoing refurbishment, with new kitchen fitout and paintwork generally.

Outbuildings and cattleyards

Outbuildings at Arnprior include a machinery shed, garage and hayshed located to the rear (west) of the homestead. Of these the hayshed would appear to be the earliest, and has a bush pole framed construction with corrugated iron roof and wall sheeting. There is no evidence of a former shearing shed or sheep runs located behind the hayshed, save for a pile of aged timber. Metal cattle yards adjacent to the hayshed are modern. A second hayshed is located on the eastern side of Mayfield Road and has a similar bush pole and corrugated iron construction.

The machinery shed is a steel-framed shed, open on one side, with modern metal profile wall and roof sheeting. Adjacent a former garage is timber framed and has modern metal sheeting to walls and corrugated iron to the roof. A timber framed skillion addition on one side is partially collapsed.

A late 20th-century corrugated iron shearing shed is located some 500 m to the north of the house. This shearing shed is in a largely dilapidated state, with the collapse of the western end of the shed and loss of much of the corrugated iron wall sheeting.

Church footings and Larbert Cemetery

Located near to the entrance to Arnprior on Mayfield Road, are the rubble stone footings and concrete entrance steps of a small rectangular former church. On either side are two mature pine trees, which may be contemporary with the church.

A small cemetery is located on the rise behind the former church, which includes marble and sandstone headstones for members of the Roberts, Bassingthwaighte and Stephens's families who died at the end of the 19th and first decades of the 20th centuries. The headstones are generally in fair condition.

Landscaping

The immediate area around the homestead and outbuildings contains several mature plantings, including remains of former orchard, yucca sp and group of radiata pines in front of the homestead; rows of mature conifers to the south and west of the homestead complex as well as substantial poplars. Immediately behind the homestead complex is a series of cleared paddocks, which rise to form a small ridge with natural bush land setting.

The homestead was reported as being in poor condition as at 30 July 2009.

Arnprior has a moderate degree of integrity. It has remnant elements of the original 1820s landscape including the main homestead, cleared home paddocks, orchard and early road remains as well as archaeological evidence of early staff accommodation and the remains of Larbert township. The property has lost all of its original outbuildings although some archaeological evidence of these may remain. The archaeological evidence throughout the property is likely to retain a moderate to high degree of integrity although there is evidence of some recent disturbance due to ploughing.

== Heritage listing ==
Arnprior is of State significance as one of the earliest land grants and settlements in the Shoalhaven River area, which is able to demonstrate patterns of land allocation and use in southern NSW during the early decades of the NSW colony, particularly the granting of land to early free settlers and the surveying of roads and town reserves in settled districts in the 1820s and 30s. This is evidenced through the known (church and cemetery) and potential archaeological evidence of the early township of Larbert located within the property of Arnprior.

Arnprior is of Local significance for its association with the Ryrie family, who were prominent land owners and settlers in southern NSW. As one of the earliest Ryrie-owned properties it provides evidence of the changing fortunes of the Ryrie family and the growth of their prominence in southern NSW.

Arnprior is of State significance for its ability to demonstrate the operation of early colonial pastoral properties with assigned convict labour and use of local Aboriginal labour, as demonstrated through the mix of homestead, early sheds and potential archaeological evidence of convict housing associated with the property.

Arnprior is a Locally representative example of early colonial settlements in NSW, retaining its original homestead and a range of archaeological remains and landscape features associated with early occupation. This significance has been compromised however through the loss of all of the original outbuildings, as well as intrusive alterations to the homestead itself. Despite these however, there is sufficient detail within the homestead to provide evidence of its earliest construction and subsequent phases of development, as well as early 19th to early 20th century vernacular construction techniques generally.

The property has State significance for its landscape qualities. The grouping of the homestead on the rise amongst a setting of large mature conifers, with cleared paddocks around Gilberts Creek and the ruin of the shearing shed, evoke the earliest days of settlement within southern NSW, particularly when viewed from Mayfield Road.

Arnprior was listed on the New South Wales State Heritage Register on 18 November 1999 having satisfied the following criteria.

The place is important in demonstrating the course, or pattern, of cultural or natural history in New South Wales.

Arnprior has State heritage significance under this criterion.

Arnprior has historic significance as one of the earliest land grants in the Shoalhaven River area, which retains physical evidence of the earliest settlement on the property in the form of the homestead and archaeological evidence dating from c. 1830. The property is able to demonstrate patterns of land allocation and use in southern NSW, particularly the granting of land to early free settlers and the surveying of roads and town reserves in the settled districts in the 1820s and 30s. The property also has the potential to demonstrate the operation of early colonial pastoral properties with its assigned convict labour and use of local Aboriginal labour.

The place has a strong or special association with a person, or group of persons, of importance of cultural or natural history of New South Wales's history.

Arnprior has Local heritage significance under this criterion.

Arnprior is directly associated with the notable Ryrie family. The Ryries were key pioneering settlers in southern NSW, known particularly around the Snowy Mountains area. Their first major landholding in Australia was at Arnprior, and tells of the changing fortunes and rising prominence of the Ryrie family in comparison to their later properties. Arnprior still retains evidence associated with the early Ryrie occupation of the property including the main homestead with its carved thistle motif over the front door.

The place is important in demonstrating aesthetic characteristics and/or a high degree of creative or technical achievement in New South Wales.

Arnprior has State heritage significance under this criterion.

The grouping of the main homestead on the rise with the cleared paddocks around Gilberts Creek, the large plantings of conifers around the house and the ruin of the shearing shed to the north present and pleasing Australian rural landscape, particularly when viewed from Mayfield Road. The original form of the house within the cleared home paddocks is able to evoke the earliest days of settlement within the region of southern NSW with the views from Mayfield Road remaining much as they would have appeared to early travellers in the district.

The homestead has technical significance as an example of a colonial rural homestead, although this significance has been compromised by later intrusive modifications. Despite these however, there is sufficient detail within the homestead to provide evidence of its earliest construction and subsequent phases of development, as well as early 19th to early 20th century vernacular construction techniques. The cedar door architrave with thistle motif is a detail distinctive to Arnprior, and provides physical evidence of the importance to the Ryrie family to demonstrate their ancestry deriving from their new home at Arnprior.

The place has strong or special association with a particular community or cultural group in New South Wales for social, cultural or spiritual reasons.

The social significance of Arnprior has not been formally assessed through community consultation. However, it is likely that the property would retain significance to the Ryrie family, a family of note in the history of NSW, as the first family property in Southern NSW, as well as the local historical society and potentially people throughout the State with an interest in early colonial architecture and settlement patterns.

The place has potential to yield information that will contribute to an understanding of the cultural or natural history of New South Wales.

Arnprior has potential State heritage significance under this criterion.

Archaeological evidence associated with early colonial occupation of NSW is becoming increasingly rare. In particular, little archaeological work has been undertaken into the system of convict housing and work in rural areas, outside the confines of established secondary prisons, asylums and concentrated convict settlements in townships such as Parramatta and Port Macquarie. Arnprior has the potential to reveal information about the lives and works of assigned convicts that is not available in written records.

The main homestead building also has considerable research potential. Little has been found in historic records about the original construction or the numerous changes made to the building throughout its life. Layers of fabric associated with these changes are likely to remain and add to our knowledge of the various stages of development at the property and early nineteenth century building techniques.

The place possesses uncommon, rare or endangered aspects of the cultural or natural history of New South Wales.

Arnprior has State heritage significance under this criterion.

Arnprior contains a range of architectural and archaeological evidence from the earliest days of European settlement in southern NSW. Although there are a number of early homesteads remaining in the southern tablelands, Arnprior is particularly early and retains an unusual range of evidence including the remains of the village of Larbert, church and cemetery, and potentially convict housing associated with Arnprior itself.

The place is important in demonstrating the principal characteristics of a class of cultural or natural places/environments in New South Wales.

Arnprior has Local heritage significance under this criterion. Arnprior is representative of early colonial settlements in southern NSW, retaining its original homestead and a range of archaeological remains and landscape features associated with the early occupation. It is not an exceptional representative example as it has lost all of its original outbuildings and there have been a number of intrusive changes to the main house.
