= Larbert, New South Wales =

Town in Australia

Larbert
- Town
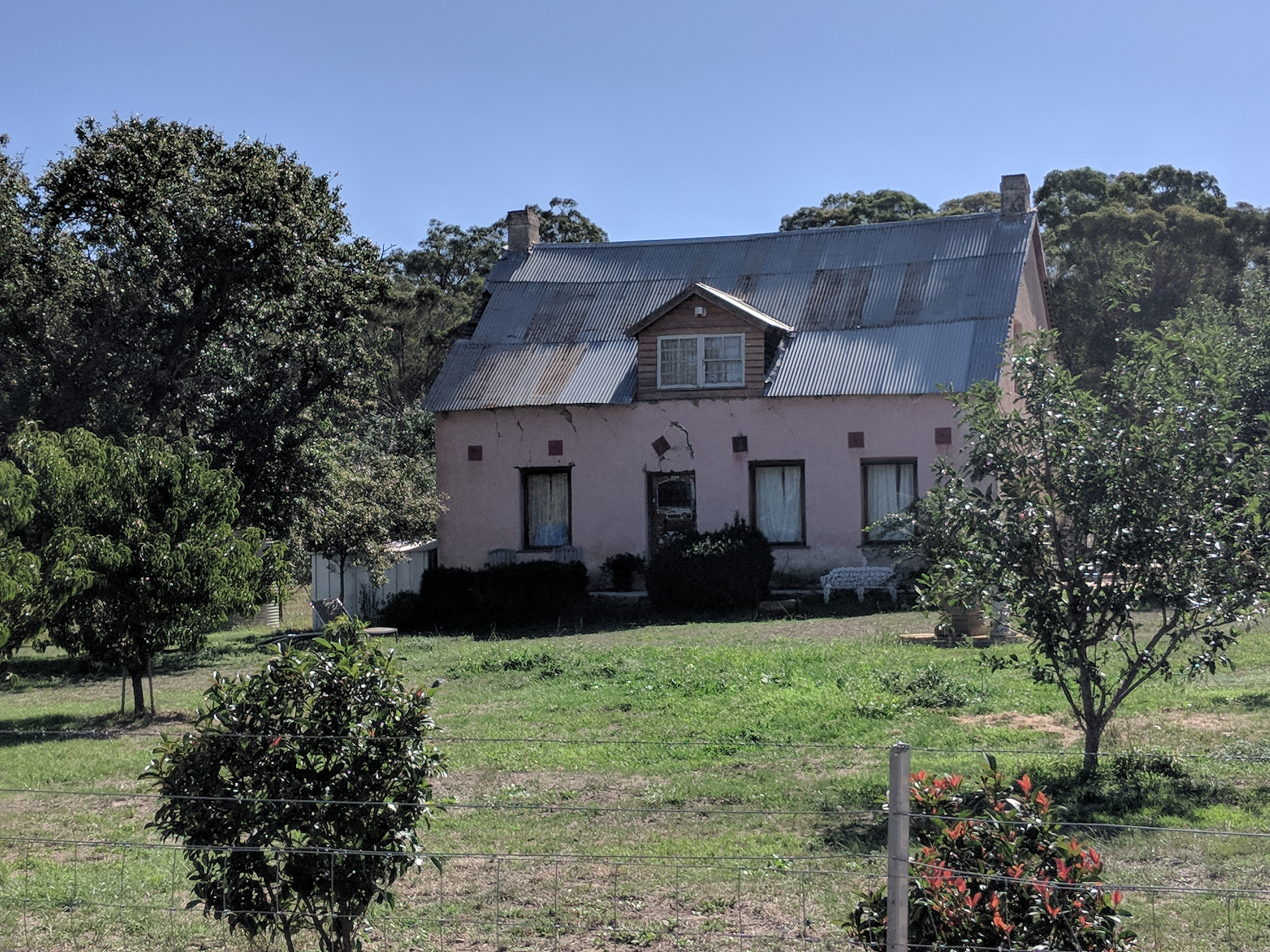
- House in Larbert

- Interactive map of Larbert
- Coordinates: 35°17′44″S 149°46′8″E
- Country: Australia
- State: New South Wales
- Region: Southern Tablelands
- LGA: Queanbeyan–Palerang
- Location: 85 km (53 mi) E of Canberra; 15 km (9.3 mi) N of Braidwood; 70 km (43 mi) E of Queanbeyan; 76 km (47 mi) NW of Batemans Bay; 279 km (173 mi) SW of Sydney

Government
  - State electorate: Monaro
  - Federal division: Eden-Monaro
- Elevation: 580 m (1,900 ft)

Population
  - Total: 34 (2021 census)
- Postcode: 2622
- County: Murray; St Vincent
- Parish: Larbert; Bruce
Localities around Larbert
Manar	Mayfield	Marlowe
Warri	Larbert	Durran Durra
Bombay	Braidwood	Braidwood

Larbert is a locality in the Queanbeyan-Palerang Region of the Southern Tablelands region of New South Wales. It lies mostly north of the Kings Highway between Bungendore and Braidwood where it crosses the Shoalhaven River. At the 2021 census, it had a population of 34.

== History ==
=== Aboriginal and early settler history ===
The area now known as Larbert lies on the traditional lands of Walbanga people, a group of Yuin. After settler colonisation, it was part of the County of Murray—west of the river, in what would become the Parish of Larbert—and east of the river was of the County of St. Vincent. It lay within the Nineteen Counties, in which settlement was permitted by the colonial government. The area was included in the surveying of the colonial lands, carried out under Thomas Mitchell's supervision.

The early name for the area, Kurraducbidgee, sometimes spelt Kurraduckbidgee, was said to be a combination of two—presumably local—Aboriginal words, which settlers rendered as "kurraduc"—said to be either a native companion or a kind of long-beaked crane common on the Shoalhaven's river flats—and "bidgee"—said to mean a river with flats. The original use of this name by colonists probably reflects the view of Thomas Mitchell that 'native names' should be used.

Colonial settlers took up land in this area from the 1820s. The Ryrie family's property and homestead, 'Arnprior', was the nucleus of colonial settlement in the area.

By 1832, the crossing of the Shoalhaven River at Kurraducbidgee was part of the southward continuation of the Great South Road, which in those times forked at Marulan, with one route going to Bungonia and the other to Goulburn. This forking was in the—ultimately unfulfilled—hope that there would be a route found through the coastal escarpment via Bungonia, while the path through Goulburn headed in the direction of newly occupied grazing areas. The route to Sydney from the Braidwood area, in those times, was via Kurraducbidgee and Bungonia.

=== Village of Larbert ===
There was once a small village named Larbert, north of the Kings Highway, along modern-day Mayfield Road and alongside the left bank of the Shoalhaven River. It is likely, but uncertain, that Larbert is named after Larbert, Scotland.

In 1843, Larbert was proclaimed as one of the planned townships to lie along route of the road from Braidwood to Jervis Bay, at a locality then named as Kurraducbidgee, which is said to be its local Aboriginal name. This portion of the road was originally part of an existing road—leading to Bungonia and ultimately to Sydney via Marulan—and it was upgraded to connect to the new 'Wool Road'. The new township site was adjacent to William Ryrie's 2,650 acre landholding Arnprior, near the location where the road crossed the river via a ford.

It seems that Ryrie had plans to irrigate his land from the Shoalhaven and farm it using convict labour. The township of Larbert was a part of those plans. Allotments were sold in the township in 1843 and 1852. There was also to be a village on the right bank of the river at the crossing, bearing the earlier name of the area, Kurraducbidgee.

New South Wales entered an economic depression in the early 1840s. The Wool Road was a failure, and Ryrie turned his attention to the Port Phillip District, reducing Larbert's prospects of growth. Ryrie even attempted to dispose of Arnprior, in 1844, without success.

However, any plans for the township were curtailed by the demonstration—during the Shoalhaven River flood of July 1853—that most of its site was flood prone—as some had foreseen—bringing scorn and ridicule upon the government and its surveyor, James Larmer. Fortunately, no houses had been built there at the time. The site lay on a natural floodplain, just upstream from where the topography constricts the width of river valley. Flood waters could rise very quickly at Larbert—without any prior warning—following rain in the upper part of the Shoalhaven catchment.

Nonetheless, the river crossing was on the mail route from Braidwood to Sydney in 1854, it was also used by the gold escort in 1852, and it was on what seems to have been a stage coach route in 1858. A small settlement did develop at Larbert. From around 1858, there was a public house known as the 'Cottage of Content' and, from 1866, it also served as a post office. It was affected by serious floods in 1860, 1867, and 1870, and the building would be lost altogether in yet another flood in 1925.

Mail was still being carried over the crossing in April 1867 but an observer noted that, "really the mail road from Arnprior to Boro by the Stony Range is in such a rascally condition that it is almost impassable, and it is a marvel how the mail-drivers manage to get along in the dark." With the delays due to floods and the terrible condition of the road, it was only a matter of time before this route would cease to be the main route to Sydney.

A shorter road from Braidwood to Goulburn (modern-day Goulburn Road) was made, via another crossing of the Shoalhaven at Warri, and opened to traffic in 1862 However, parts of the new road became boggy after rain, and the mail service, alternately, used the new road and older Larbert route. In 1867—with the coming of the railway to Marulan imminent—there was agitation for the road from Braidwood to Marulan—via Larbert and Bungonia—to be upgraded to include a bridge at Larbert, but that route would bypass the important town of Goulburn. In 1868, estimates were made for a bridge to be situated either at the Warri or Larbert river crossing. However, by September 1868, a local landholder had erected fences across the old road and the mail could no longer be carried via Larbert. The railway reached Goulburn in May 1869 and the road bridge at Warri was opened in September 1874. Larbert was fated to become an isolated backwater.

Larbert had a public school from 1867 to 1868 and from 1874 to 1891. Larbert East school operated from 1874 to 1892. Both schools operated as "half-time" schools and as each other's partners from 1874, except in 1892 when Larbert East school was partnered with Uradux school. Land was reserved for a Union Church in 1878.

A village site was reserved on the same land as the earlier settlement, in 1881. The village had an unusual street plan with large open spaces, between the different parts of the village, corresponding to low-lying areas and reflecting the hard-won experience of earlier floods. The area continued to be flood affected, with serious floods occurring in 1900, 1925, 1934, 1943, and 1948.

Although Larbert was primarily an agricultural area, gold had been found in the area by October 1851 and the Shoalhaven's riverbed contained alluvial gold. A gold dredge operated near Larbert from 1901 to 1904.

Larbert lay on the route of a never-built proposed railway that was to link the Federal Capital Territory to what is now Jervis Bay Territory.

By 1917, the village seems to have been reduced to just one street of town allotments. By 1948, the village's small Union Church, while then still standing, had not been used for eight years. It was revived for a time, but finally sold in the 1970s. Larbert was designated as the name of the locality in 1969.

== Present day ==
The part of Larbert that lies on the left bank of the Shoalhaven is a quiet locality, with grazing and agriculture the main economic activity.

One of the old village's street names, Borough Street (originally Boro Street), still appears on modern-day maps. The modern-day Borough Street runs for most of its length across private land, and the road now runs only as far as the Arnprior homestead, not to Boro. Just before Borough Street diverges from Mayfield Road, on the western side of Mayfield Road, there is an old house and the ruin of a single-storey brick building, both of which were once part of the village. On private land, all that is left of the church now are its foundations, front steps, and the adjoining cemetery.

Larbert Road still runs from the Kings Highway outside Braidwood toward the old river crossing but these days is only a local road. The area of the locality, near the right bank of the river, is now the site of an extensive quarrying operation.

== Heritage listings ==
Larbert has a number of heritage-listed sites, including:

- Arnprior, Mayfield Road: Larbert
