= Durran Durra =

- Town
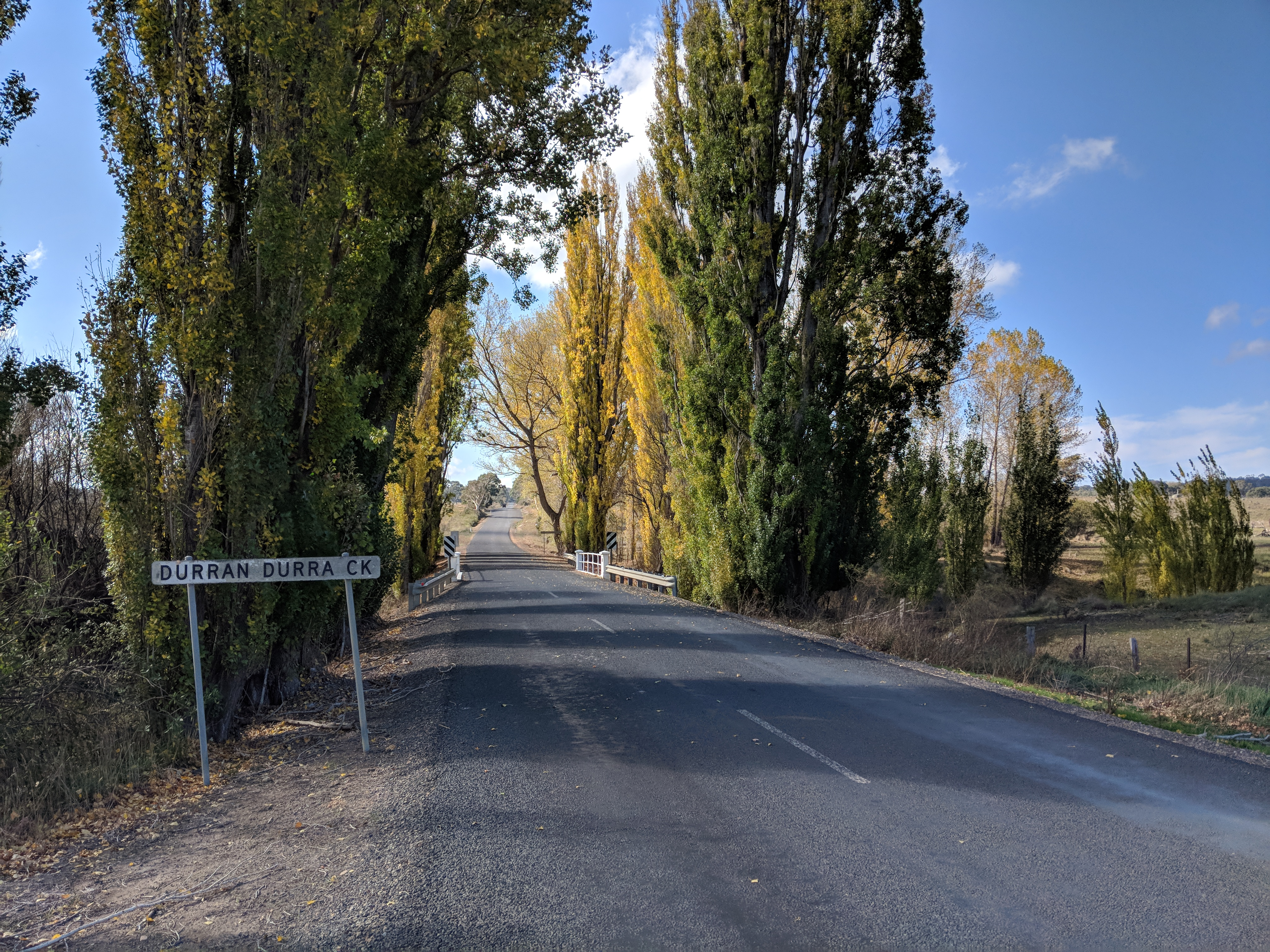
- Durran Durra creek

- Coordinates: 35°18′57″S 149°53′02″E
- Country: Australia
- State: New South Wales
- Region: Southern Tablelands
- LGA: Queanbeyan-Palerang Regional Council
- Location: 14 km (8.7 mi) N of Braidwood; 100 km (62 mi) E of Canberra; 85 km (53 mi) E of Queanbeyan; 75 km (47 mi) NW of Batemans Bay; 251 km (156 mi) SW of Sydney

Government
  - State electorate: Monaro
  - Federal division: Eden-Monaro
- Elevation: 688 m (2,257 ft)

Population
  - Total: 114 (2021 census)
- Postcode: 2622
- County: St Vincent
- Parish: Durran Durra
Localities around Durran Durra
Mayfield	Marlowe	Tomboye
Larbert	Durran Durra	Back Creek
Larbert	Braidwood	Mongarlowe

Durran Durra is a locality in the Queanbeyan–Palerang Regional Council, New South Wales, Australia. It is located on the road from Braidwood to Nowra about 15 km north of Braidwood and 100 km east of Canberra. At the 2021 census, it had a population of 114. It consists mainly of grazing country.

The area now known as Durran Durra lies on the traditional lands of the Walbanga people, a group of the Yuin.

In 1827, James Ryrie took over land in the area, as a land grant authorized by Governor Darling. James died in 1840 and his property was consolidated with the nearby Ryrie family property, Arnprior, at neighbouring Larbert.

Durran Durra had a "half-time" school from 1872 to 1898, from 1904 to 1905 and from 1915 to 1921.
