= Alexander Ryrie =

Australian politician

Alexander Ryrie (27 December 1827 – 29 May 1909) was an Australian politician, who was born in Sydney to Stewart Ryrie, a pastoralist and deputy commissary-general, and his second wife, Isabella Cassels. He farmed with his brothers in the Monaro district, notably near Bombala and Michelago. On 5 July 1860, he married Charlotte Faunce, with whom he had nine children, including Major General Sir Granville de Laune Ryrie and William M. Ryrie.

In 1880, he was elected to the New South Wales Legislative Assembly as the member for Braidwood, serving until his defeat in 1891. In 1892, he was appointed to the New South Wales Legislative Council, where he served until his death at Paddington on 29 May 1909.

== See also ==
- Stewart Ryrie, his father
- David Ryrie, his brother
- William Ryrie, his half brother
- Stewart Ryrie Jr, his half brother
- Granville Ryrie, his son

New South Wales Legislative Assembly
Preceded by Edward Greville	Member for Braidwood; 1880–1891	Succeeded by Austin Chapman
