= Worrowing Heights =

- Town
- Coordinates: 35°04′46″S 150°38′19″E
- Country: Australia
- State: New South Wales
- Region: South Coast
- LGA: City of Shoalhaven
- Location: 196 km (122 mi) S of Sydney; 26 km (16 mi) S of Nowra

Government
  - State electorate: South Coast
  - Federal division: Gilmore

Population
  - Total: 506 (2016 census)
- Postcode: 2540
- County: St Vincent
- Parish: Bherwerre
Localities around Worrowing Heights
Tomerong	Huskisson	Vincentia
St Georges Basin	Worrowing Heights	Vincentia
Sanctuary Point	Old Erowal Bay	Erowal Bay

Worrowing Heights is a locality in the City of Shoalhaven in New South Wales, Australia. It lies west of Vincentia, which is on Jervis Bay, and north of St Georges Basin. At the 2016 census, it had a population of 506.
