= Sanctuary Point =

- Town
- Coordinates: 35°06′13″S 150°37′36″E
- Country: Australia
- State: New South Wales
- Region: South Coast
- LGA: City of Shoalhaven

Government
  - State electorate: South Coast
  - Federal division: Gilmore

Population
  - Total: 7,874 (2021 census)
- County: St Vincent
- Parish: Bherwerre
Localities around Sanctuary Point
Tomerong	Worrowing Heights	Old Erowal Bay
St Georges Basin	Sanctuary Point	Erowal Bay
St Georges Basin	St Georges Basin	St Georges Basin

Sanctuary Point is a town in New South Wales, Australia, under the jurisdiction of the City of Shoalhaven, on the shores of St Georges Basin. It is roughly 25 km south of Nowra, and approximately 200 km south of Sydney. At the 2021 census, the population of Sanctuary Point was 7,874.

Originally known as Redhead Point, Sanctuary Point was officially named on 24 December 1969.

== Community organisations ==
Bay and Basin Community Resources is an incorporated community based, non-profit non-government organisation based at Sanctuary Point.

The organisation was established in 1990 to implement community services in the local area and is a major provider of community services in the Shoalhaven region.

Aged care services provided by the organisation include the Bay and Basin Respite Day Care Service, Shoalhaven Neighbour Aid, Carers Support Group, Shoalhaven Dementia Respite Service and the Bay And Basin Community Resources Aged Care Centre. In 2001 more than 30 full-time and casual staff were employed, with over 70 volunteers.

The organisation was active in campaigning for the construction of the Bay and Basin Leisure Centre, which was opened in September 2001. The organisation also sought and received funding from the Commonwealth Government for the erection of a sculpture outside the centre, as well as contributing to the sculpture design.

As an active community organisation it holds community events to draw attention to social issues in the community such as raising awareness of child abuse.

In August 2001, after the Sydney Olympics the organisation was awarded an ex-Olympic minibus to be used in providing transport for the region's elderly, frail, aged and disabled residents. State Member for the South Coast, Wayne Smith said at the time "The Bay and Basin Community Resource Centre is a leading provider of aged and respite care in the region, assisting the frail, aged, older people, disadvantaged young people, people with a disability, people with dementia and their carers,"

In July 2006 the Bay and Basin Community Resources gained a permanent community radio broadcast licence for Bay and Basin FM, and has since engaged in an active outside broadcast program at local social and sporting events.
