= Basin View =

- Town
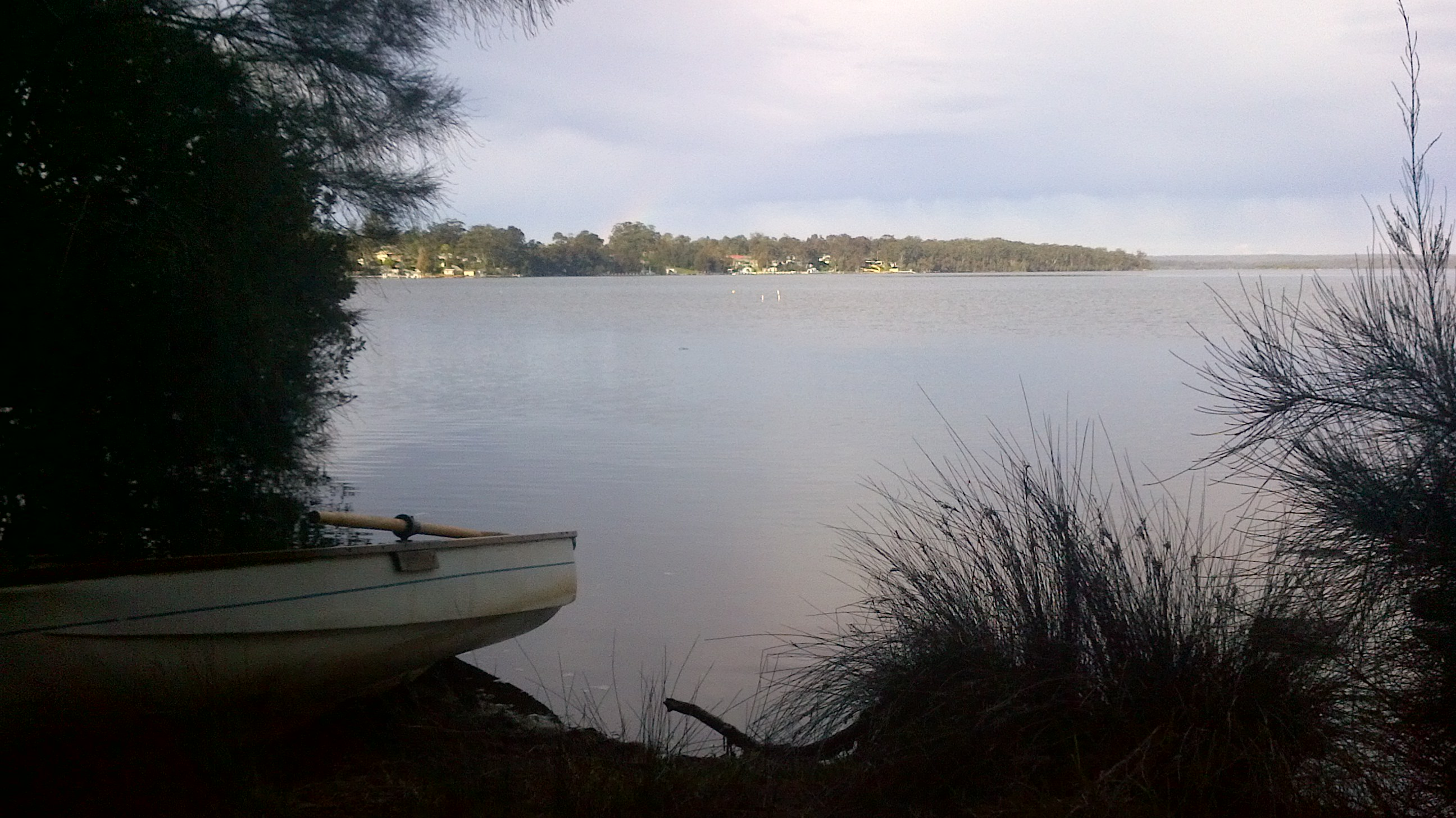
- Basin View looking east

- Coordinates: 35°05.5′S 150°34′E
- Country: Australia
- State: New South Wales
- Region: South Coast
- LGA: City of Shoalhaven

Government
  - State electorate: South Coast
  - Federal division: Gilmore

Population
  - Total: 1,554 (2016 census)
- County: St Vincent
- Parish: Wandrawandian
Localities around Basin View
Bewong	Tomerong	Tomerong
Wandandian	Basin View	St Georges Basin
Sussex Inlet	St Georges Basin	St Georges Basin

Basin View is a town in New South Wales, Australia in the City of Shoalhaven, on the shores of St Georges Basin. It is roughly 25 km south of Nowra, and approximately 200 km south of Sydney. At the 2016 census, the population of Basin View was 1,554.
