= St Georges Basin, New South Wales =

St Georges Basin
- Town
- Coordinates: 35°07′48″S 150°37′37″E
- Country: Australia
- State: New South Wales
- Region: South Coast
- LGA: City of Shoalhaven

Government
  - State electorate: South Coast
  - Federal division: Gilmore

Population
  - Total: 3,215 (2021 census)
- Postcode: 2540
- County: St Vincent
- Parish: Farnham
Localities around St Georges Basin
Tomerong	Tomerong	Worrowing Heights
Basin View	St Georges Basin	Old Erowal Bay
St Georges Basin	St Georges Basin	Sanctuary Point

St Georges Basin is a town in the South Coast region of New South Wales, Australia. St George Basin is located on the shores of St Georges Basin, within the City of Shoalhaven. It is roughly 25 kilometres (16 mi) south of Nowra, and approximately 200 kilometres (120 mi) south of Sydney.

The 2021 census, found that the population of St Georges Basin was 3215.

Prominent residents have included actor Steve Dodd.
