= Wrights Beach =

- Town
- Coordinates: 35°07′S 150°40′E
- Country: Australia
- State: New South Wales
- Region: South Coast
- LGA: City of Shoalhaven

Government
  - State electorate: South Coast
  - Federal division: Gilmore

Population
  - Total: 137 (SAL 2021)
- Postcode: 2540
- County: St Vincent
- Parish: Bherwerre
Localities around Wrights Beach
| | Erowal Bay | Hyams Beach |
| St Georges Basin | Wrights Beach | Hyams Beach |
| St Georges Basin | Jervis Bay Territory | Jervis Bay Territory |

Wrights Beach is a town in the City of Shoalhaven in New South Wales, Australia. It is on the shores of St Georges Basin, near the Jervis Bay Territory.

== Demographics ==
As at the 2016 census, the population of Wrights Beach was 132. At the 2021 census, it had grown to 137.

== Geography ==
Wrights Beach is located on the eastern shore of St Georges Basin, a sort of estuary. It is located southwest of Hyams Beach. To the north is Erowal Bay, to the east is Hyams Beach, to the south is located Bream Beach, to the southwest is located Cabbage Tree Point and to the southeast is located Jervis Bay Village.
