= Cudmirrah =

- Town
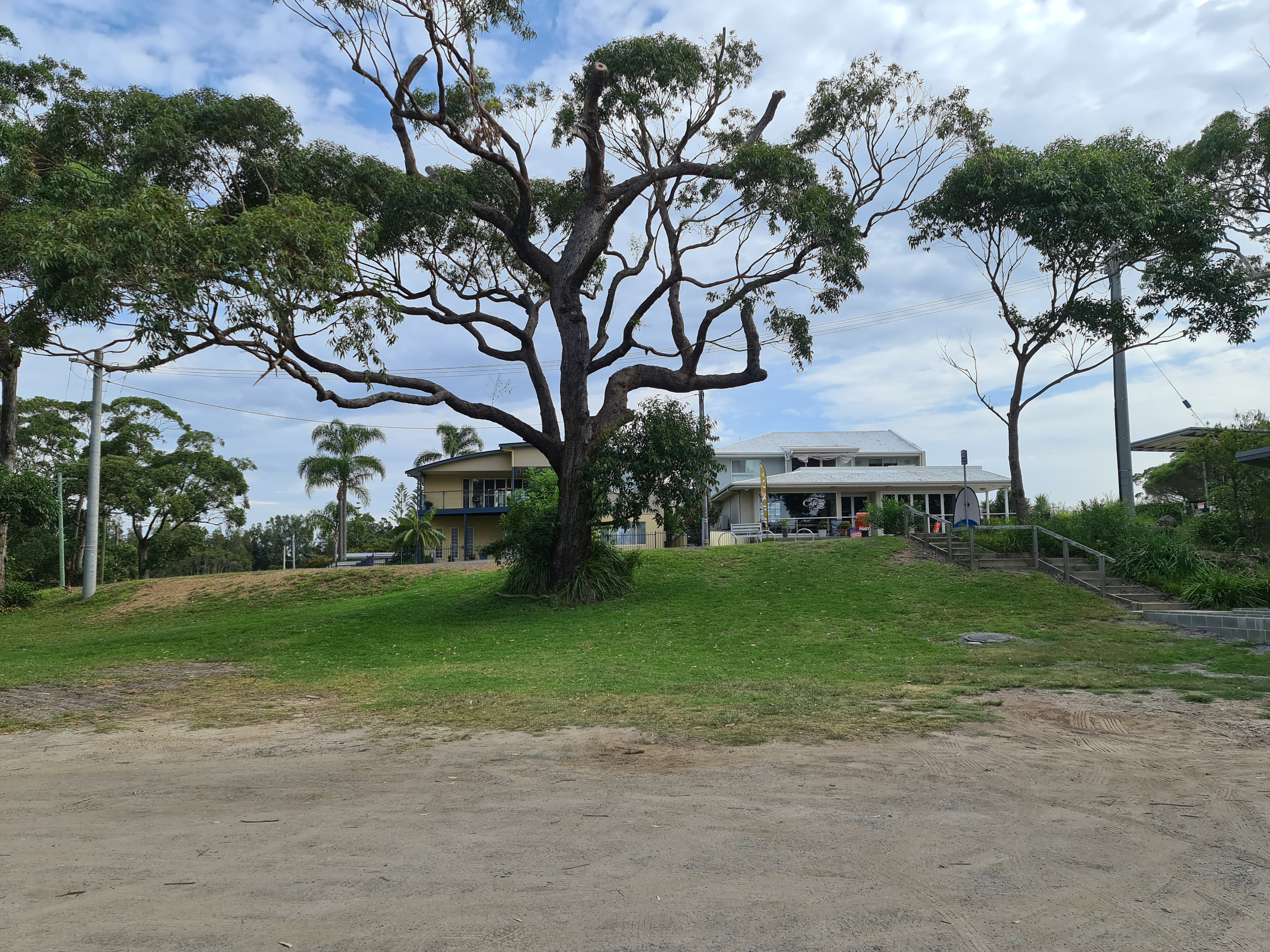

- Coordinates: 35°11′54″S 150°33′27″E
- Country: Australia
- State: New South Wales
- LGA: City of Shoalhaven
- Location: 47 km (29 mi) S of Nowra; 207 km (129 mi) S of Sydney

Government
  - State electorate: South Coast
  - Federal division: Gilmore

Population
  - Total: 284 (SAL 2021)
- Postcode: 2540
- County: St Vincent
- Parish: Cudmirrah
Localities around Cudmirrah
	Swan Lake	Swanhaven
Mondayong	Cudmirrah
	Berrara	Tasman Sea

Cudmirrah is a small coastal town in the City of Shoalhaven in New South Wales, Australia. It is located 7 km south of Sussex Inlet on the road to Berrara on the lagoon of Swan Lake and the Tasman Sea. At the 2016 census, it had a population of 275.
