= Erowal Bay =

Erowal Bay New South Wales
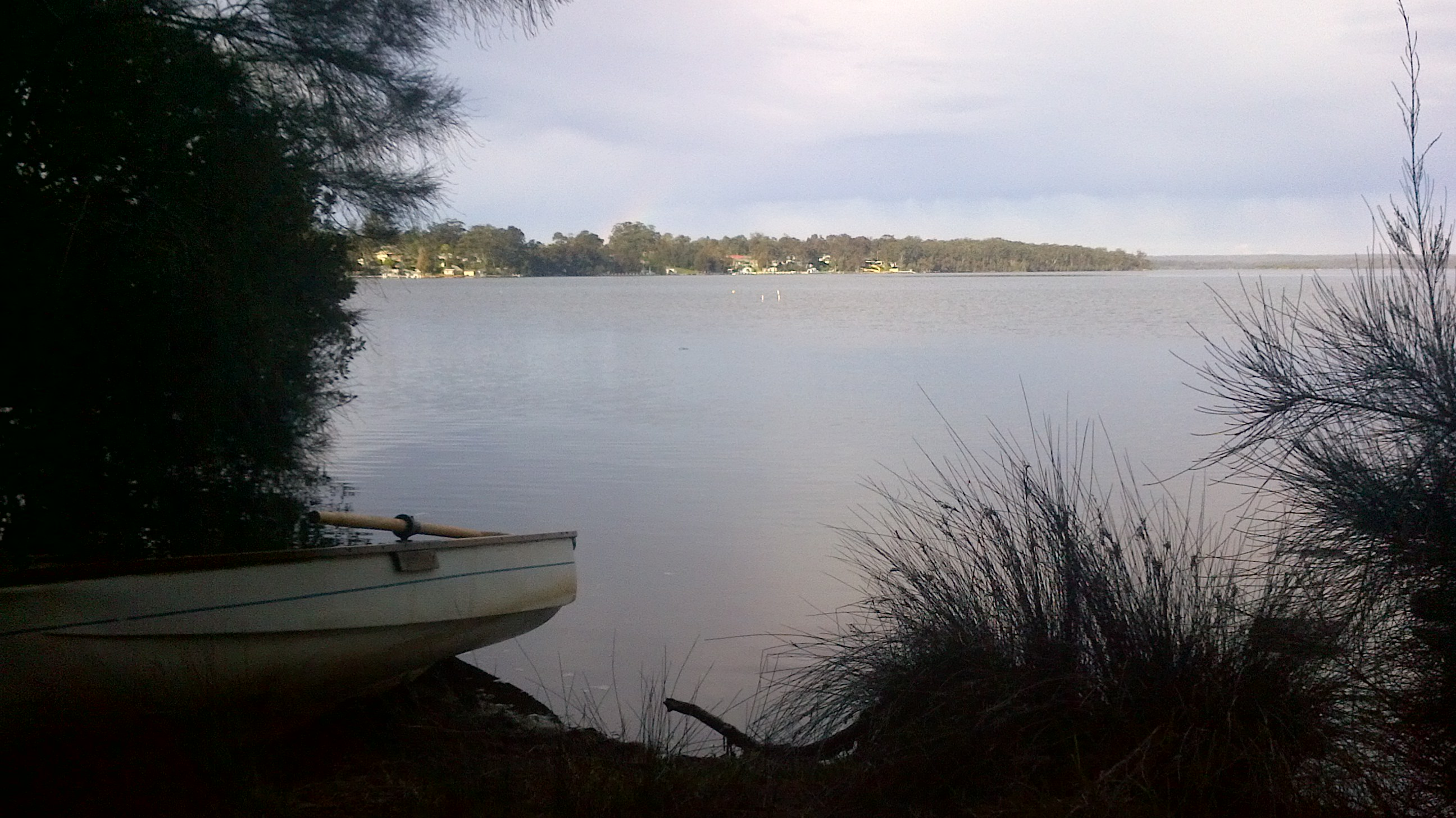
- Basin View looking east

- Coordinates: 35°05′54″S 150°39′42″E
- Population: 791 (UCL 2021)
- LGA(s): City of Shoalhaven
- Region: South Coast
- County: St Vincent
- Parish: Bherwerre
- State electorate(s): South Coast
- Federal division(s): Gilmore
Localities around Erowal Bay:
| Old Erowal Bay | Worrowing Heights | Vincentia |
| Worrowing Heights | Erowal Bay | Hyams Beach |
| Sanctuary Point | St Georges Basin | Wrights Beach |

Erowal Bay is a small town in the Shoalhaven local government area on the New South Wales south coast, on the northern side of St Georges Basin. It lies west of Hyams Beach, north of Wrights Beach and east of Old Erowal Bay. At the 2021 census, Erowal Bay had a population of 792.
