= Bream Beach =

- Town
- Coordinates: 35°06′31″S 150°39′42″E
- Country: Australia
- State: New South Wales
- LGA: City of Shoalhaven

Government
  - State electorate: South Coast
  - Federal division: Gilmore

Population
  - Total: 13 (2016 census)

Bream Beach is a suburb in the Shoalhaven local government area near the Jervis Bay Territory in Australia.

== Demographics ==
There are only 13 inhabitants of Bream Beach. The principal settlement at Bream Beach is a holiday resort where visitors are permitted to stay a maximum of 6 months per visit.

== Geography ==
Bream Beach is located on St Georges Basin, between Erowal Bay and Wrights Beach, the two closest townships.

== Wildlife ==
Bream Beach is home to kangaroos, kookaburras, rosellas, lorikeets, wombats and other native Australian wildlife.
