= Swanhaven =

- Town
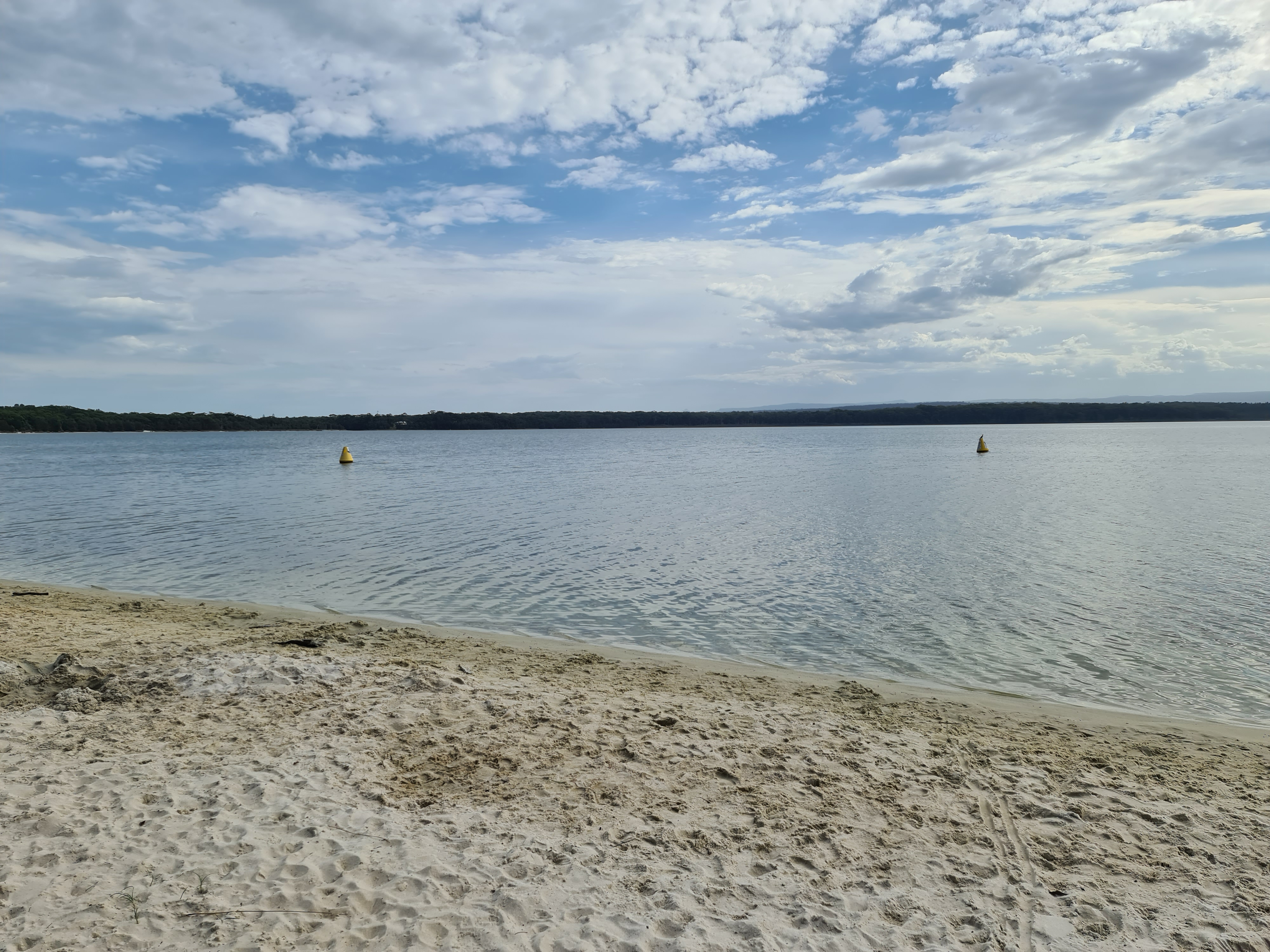
- Swan Lake from Swanhaven

- Coordinates: 35°11′11″S 150°34′24″E
- Country: Australia
- State: New South Wales
- LGA: City of Shoalhaven
- Location: 45 km (28 mi) S of Nowra; 205 km (127 mi) S of Sydney

Government
  - State electorate: South Coast
  - Federal division: Gilmore

Population
  - Total: 196 (SAL 2021)
- Postcode: 2540
- County: St Vincent
- Parish: Cudmirrah
Localities around Swanhaven
	Sussex Inlet	Sussex Inlet
Swan Lake	Swanhaven
Cudmirrah		Tasman Sea

Swanhaven is a coastal town in the City of Shoalhaven in New South Wales, Australia. It is located 5 km south of Sussex Inlet on the road to Berrara on the lagoon of Swan Lake and the Tasman Sea. At the 2016 census, it had a population of 193.
