= ShoalBus =

Australian bus company

- Headquarters: Bomaderry
- Service area: South Coast
- Fleet: 26 (August 2025)
- Website: www.shoalbus.com.au

ShoalBus is an Australian bus company based in Bomaderry operating services on the South Coast of New South Wales.

== History ==
In December 1990, Nowra Coaches sold its Bomaderry school services to North Nowra Bus Lines with three buses. In 1997 the business was rebranded North Nowra-Bomaderry Bus Lines.'

In July 2001, the Neville family who had operated Busabout Sydney, purchased the Sussex Inlet services of Roadcoach with nine buses and named the operation Sussex Inlet Bus Service.

In January 2006 North Nowra Bus Lines was purchased with 13 buses and the merged business was rebranded ShoalBus. Harrison's Motor Service was purchased in July 2006 adding a further nine buses.

== Services ==
ShoalBus operates six routes serving Gerringong, Berry, Shoalhaven Heads, Bomaderry, North Nowra, Nowra, Tomerong, Sussex Inlet and Berrara.

== Fleet ==
As at August 2025, the fleet comprised 26 vehicles.
