= Hyams Beach =

- Town
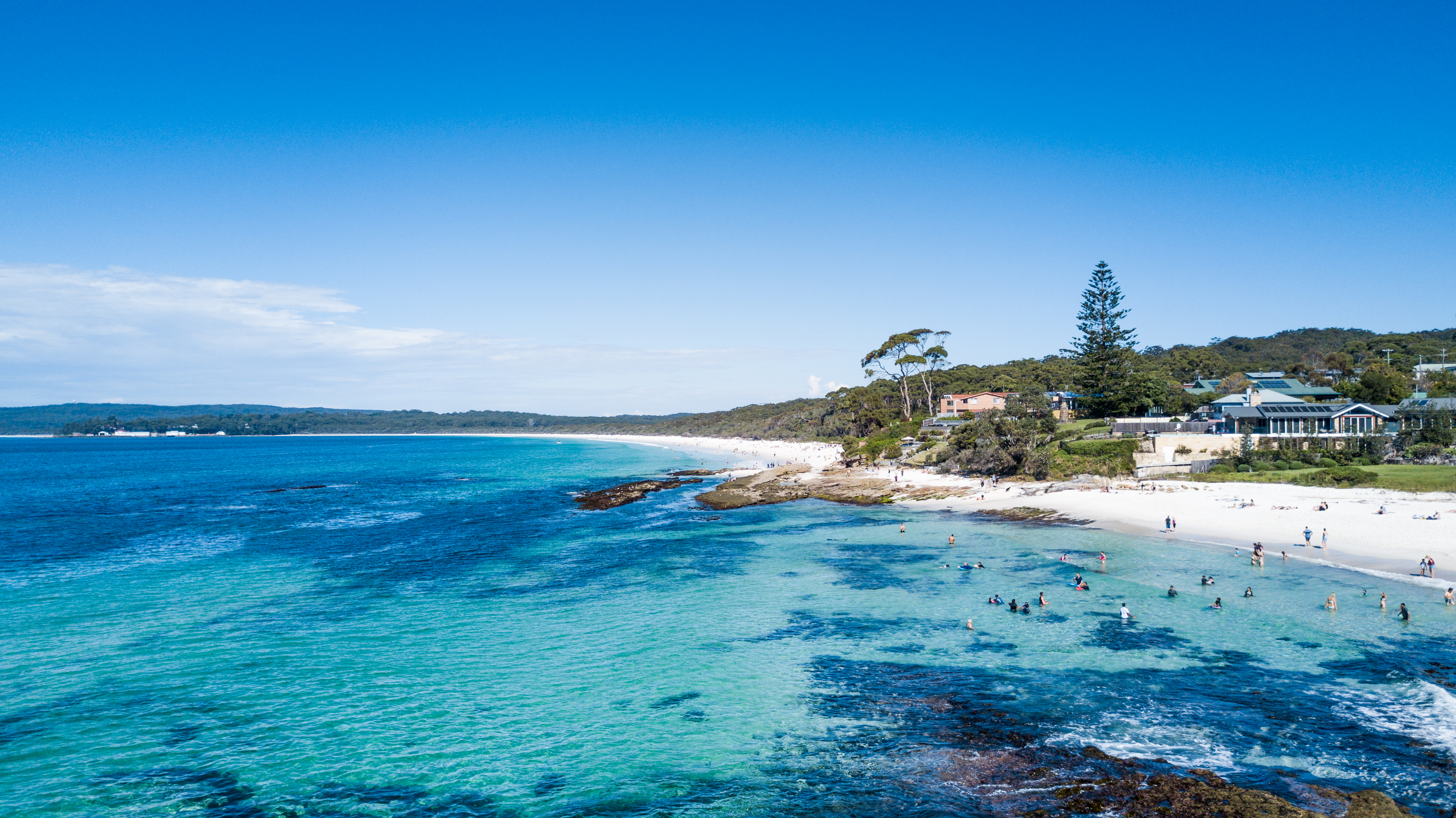
- Hyams Beach, Jervis Bay NSW

- Coordinates: 35°06′01″S 150°41′31″E
- Country: Australia
- State: New South Wales
- Region: South Coast
- LGA: City of Shoalhaven

Government
  - State electorate: South Coast
  - Federal division: Gilmore

Population
  - Total: 137 (SAL 2021)
- Postcode: 2540
- County: St Vincent
- Parish: Bherwerre
Localities around Hyams Beach
Erowal Bay	Vincentia	Jervis Bay
Wrights Beach	Hyams Beach	Jervis Bay
Jervis Bay Territory	Jervis Bay Territory	Jervis Bay Territory

Hyams Beach is a seaside village in the City of Shoalhaven, New South Wales, Australia, on the shores of Jervis Bay. The village, 180 km south of Sydney, is bordered by two beaches, Chinaman's Beach to the north and Seaman's Beach (sometimes referred to as "Sailors Beach") to the south, with Hyams Beach being in the centre. A seaside resort, its beach is known for having turquoise/aqua-coloured waters and fine, squeaky, brilliantly white sand composed of pure quartz.

== Geography ==
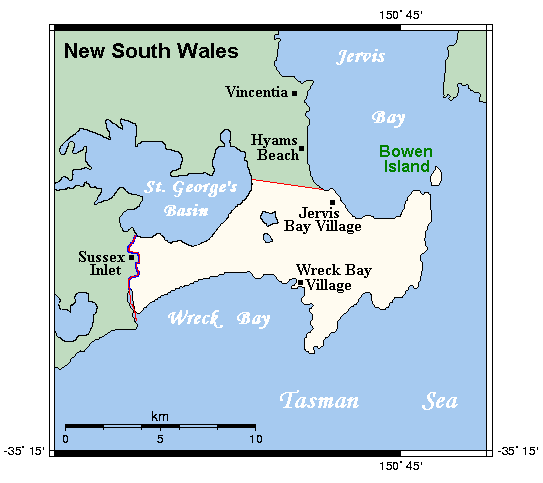
Map of the neighbouring Jervis Bay Territory showing Hyams Beach

The beaches face east, out across Jervis Bay and Point Perpendicular to the Pacific Ocean. The village is bordered by Jervis Bay National Park to the north and Booderee National Park and Botanic Gardens to the south which gives Hyams Beach a 'natural bush' feel with an abundance of native plants, animals and birdlife. Other nearby attractions include Jervis Bay Marine Park and surrounding trails and forests.

There is a myth that the beach has the whitest sands in Australia. The misconception started at the town's main store, which had a billboard stating the seaside village had "the whitest sand". Eventually, the idea became widespread and was promoted by tourism organizations. In fact Australia's whitest beaches are Lucky Bay and Hellfire Bay near Esperance, Western Australia, and Tallebudgera Creek Beach in Queensland.

=== Wildlife ===
Local wildlife is typical for the coastal Shoalhaven region.

==== Birds ====
140 bird species have been reported from Hyams Beach and surrounds. Birds likely to be found on the beach itself, or flying over the bay, include:

- Silver gull
- Crested tern
- White-bellied sea eagle
- Australian pied oystercatcher
- Australasian gannet
- Sooty oystercatcher
- White-faced heron
- Masked lapwing
- Little pied cormorant
- Little black cormorant

The coastal heath hinterland behind Hyams Beach supports one of the largest remaining populations of the endangered Eastern bristlebird.

== Tourism ==
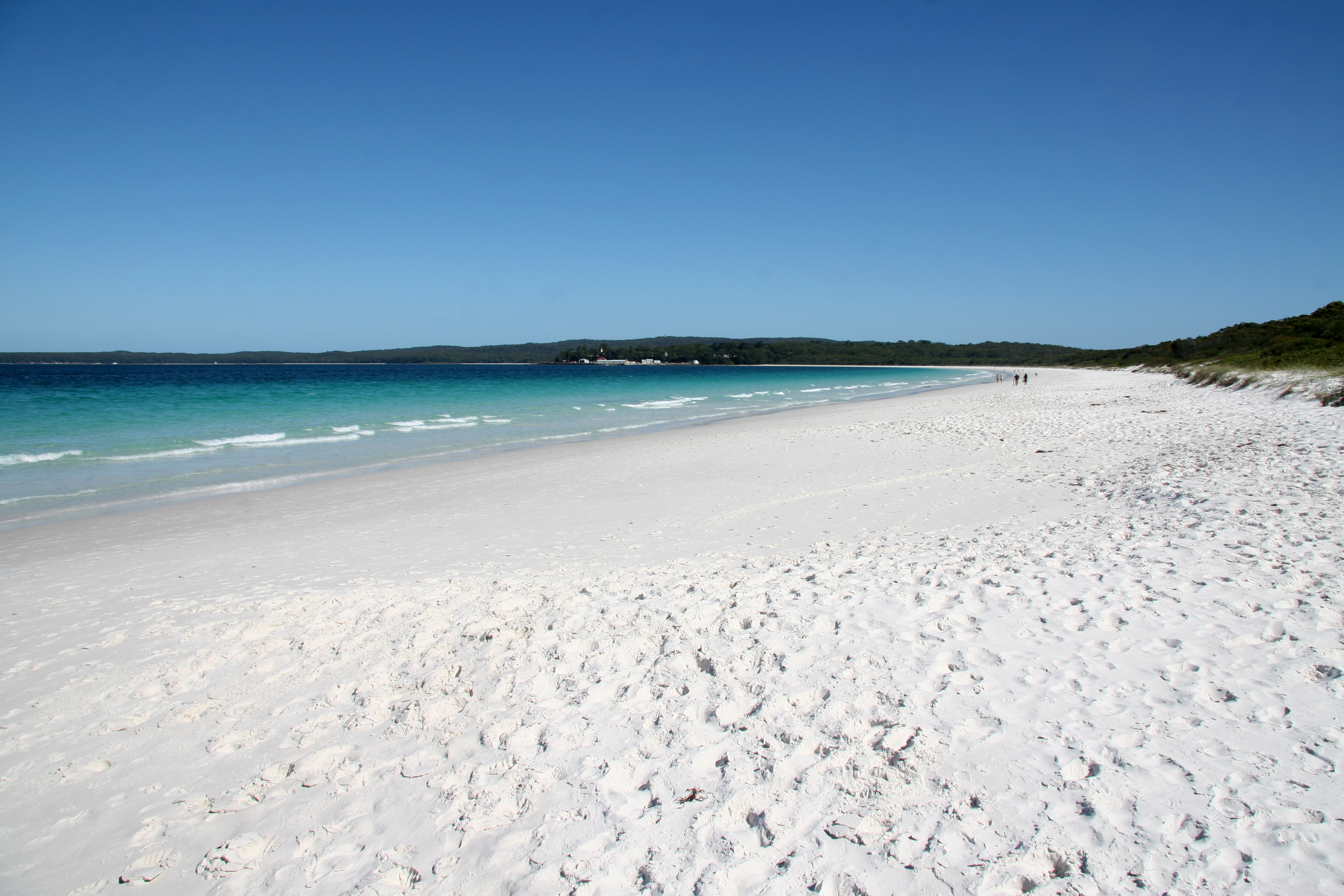
A view of its renowned white sands

Most accommodation in the village ranges from basic cottages to architecturally designed luxury beachfront houses, with some featuring bed and breakfast. There is one café store in the village. The seaside village also features bush and coastal walks which provide panoramic views of the bay, the surrounding National Park and the ocean, which is ideal for fishing, swimming, snorkelling, diving and whale watching, making it an ideal tourist spot. The encompassing bushland is home to many native animals and dozens of bird species.

Tourism and infrastructure financed has assisted in transforming Hyams Beach to one of the popular areas within the NSW tourism industry. Due to tourists visiting the area frequently and in masses, a freeway reaching the whole 190 km to Sydney was finished in 2017, costing at $580 million. A NSW tourist movement has featured the beach's radiantly white sand on the rearside of Sydney buses. The seaside village has also appeared in TV ads, thanks to publicity by Lonely Planet; the village also has a large social media presence.

== Environmental issues ==
The village's success is known to backfire with its population of 112 quickly spiringing to 4000 people in a few summer evenings, with the streets becoming engulfed with traffic and tourists littering on the beach. Because of this, local residents have pressed council to resolve the safety issues. There is only one road in and out, so when the village is overrun by cars, access for emergency vehicles and evacuation in case of bush fire becomes impossible. Now the council is closing the village once the 450 street parking spaces are at effective capacity. The local bush care group is working hard to revegetate the dunes which have been badly damaged by tourists who have pushed into the dunes to find shade or an illegal camping spot.

== Demographics ==
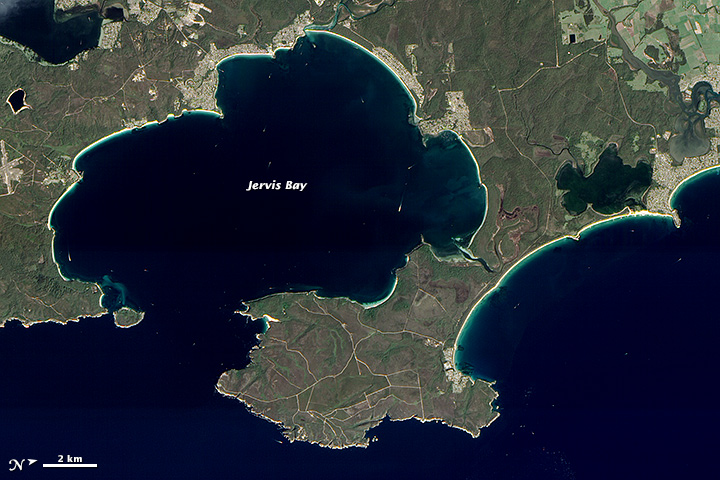
Hyams Beach lies southwest of the bay.

At the 2021 census, Hyams Beach had a population of 137.

In the 2016 Australian census, Hyams Beach appeared to be wealthy for a beach resort with 20% of its inhabitants earning more than $3000 a week, 90% of inhabitants owning their home and 93% of the houses having three or four bedrooms.

- 80.4% of 112 people living in Hyams Beach were born in Australia. The other responses for country of birth were England 8.8%, South Africa 3.9% and New Zealand 2.9%.
- The most common ancestries were English 31.7%, Scottish 19.0%, Irish 18.3%, Australian 16.2% and German 5.6%.
- The most common responses for religion were no religion, so described 30.1%, Anglican 25.2%, Catholic 20.4%, Jehovah's Witnesses 5.8% and secular beliefs 5.8%.
- 96.1% of people only spoke English at home. The only other response for language spoken at home was Afrikaans, at 3.9%.
- 70.5% were married and 7.4% were either divorced or separated.
- Of occupied private dwellings, 100% were separate houses.

== History ==
The area now known as Hyams Beach lies on the traditional lands of a group of the Yuin, members of what early settlers called 'the Jervis Bay tribe'. The 'Jervis Bay tribe' are also known as the Wandandian people and spoke Dharamba, which was probably the northernmost dialect of the Dhurga language.

Hyam's Beach is named after Michael Hyam, who was granted 41 acres of land there in 1859.

Developer Henry Halloran, who bought up tracts of land around Jervis Bay following the declaration of the Jervis Bay Territory. was offering land for sale at Hyams Beach around 1916. Hyams Beach would have been adjacent to his far larger 'Pacific City' development, which never eventuated. In the mid-1920s, Halloran was erecting holiday cottages for letting at Hyams Beach. As late as 1938, the village still had no electricity.

== Gallery ==
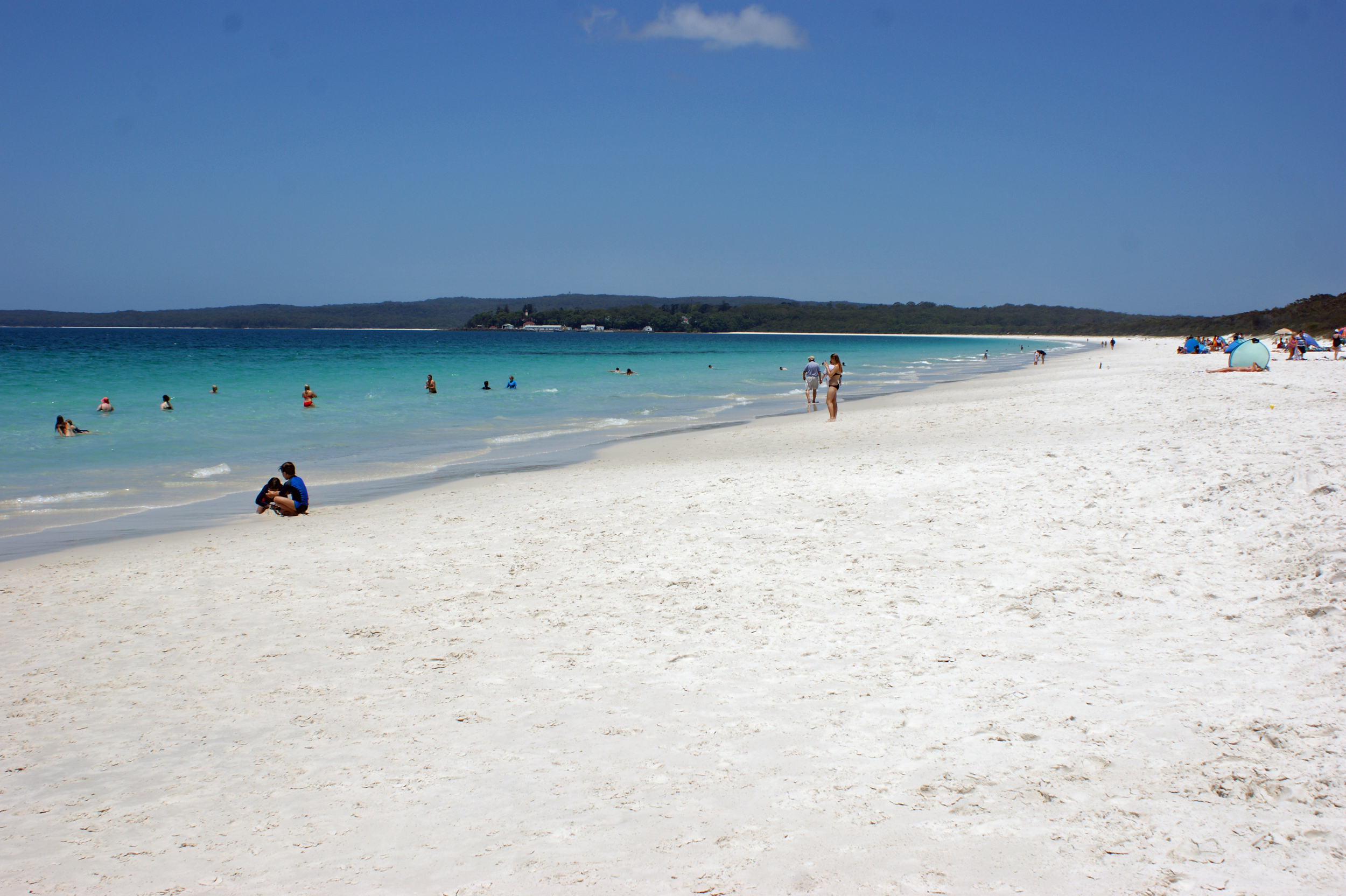

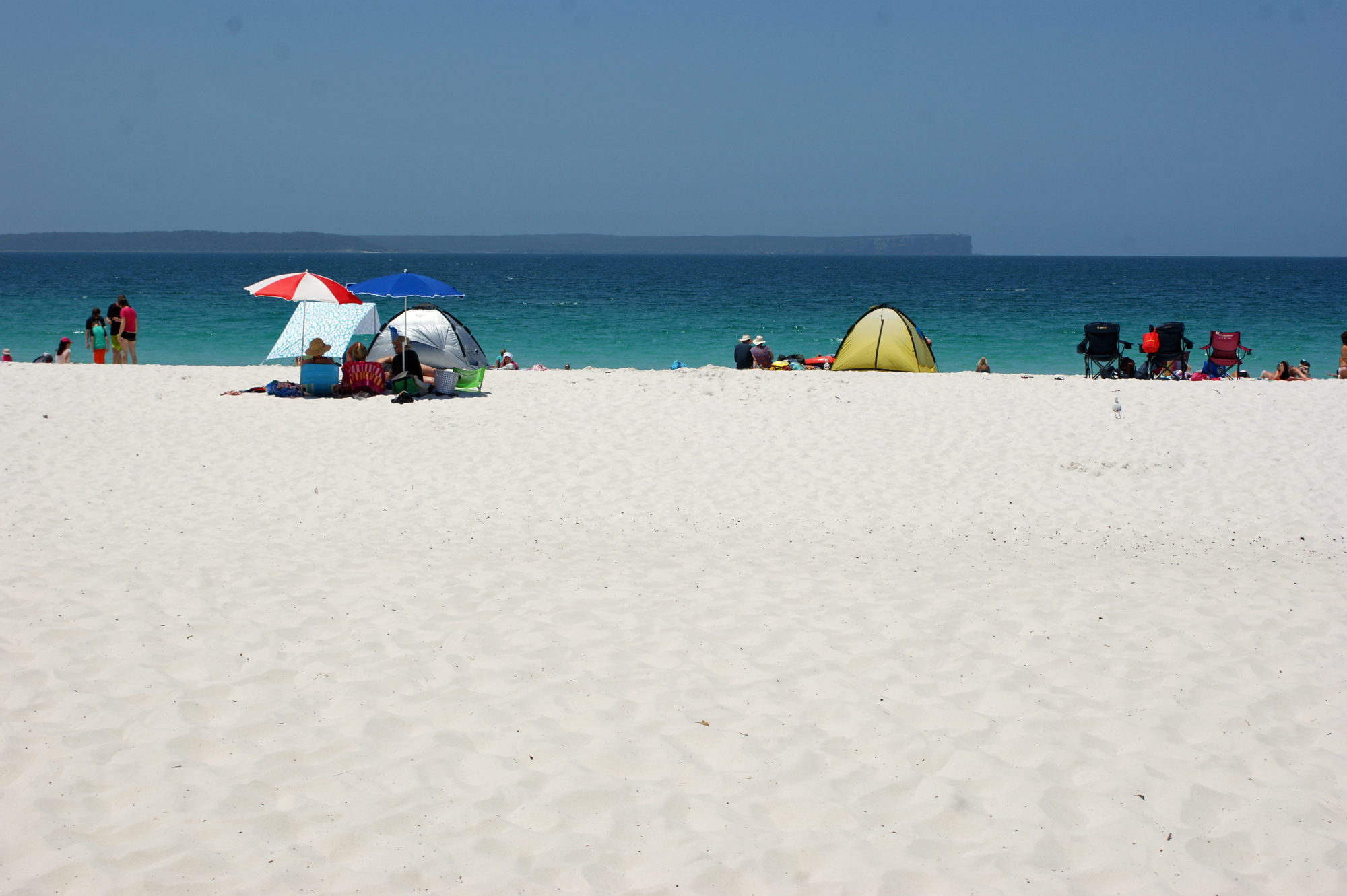

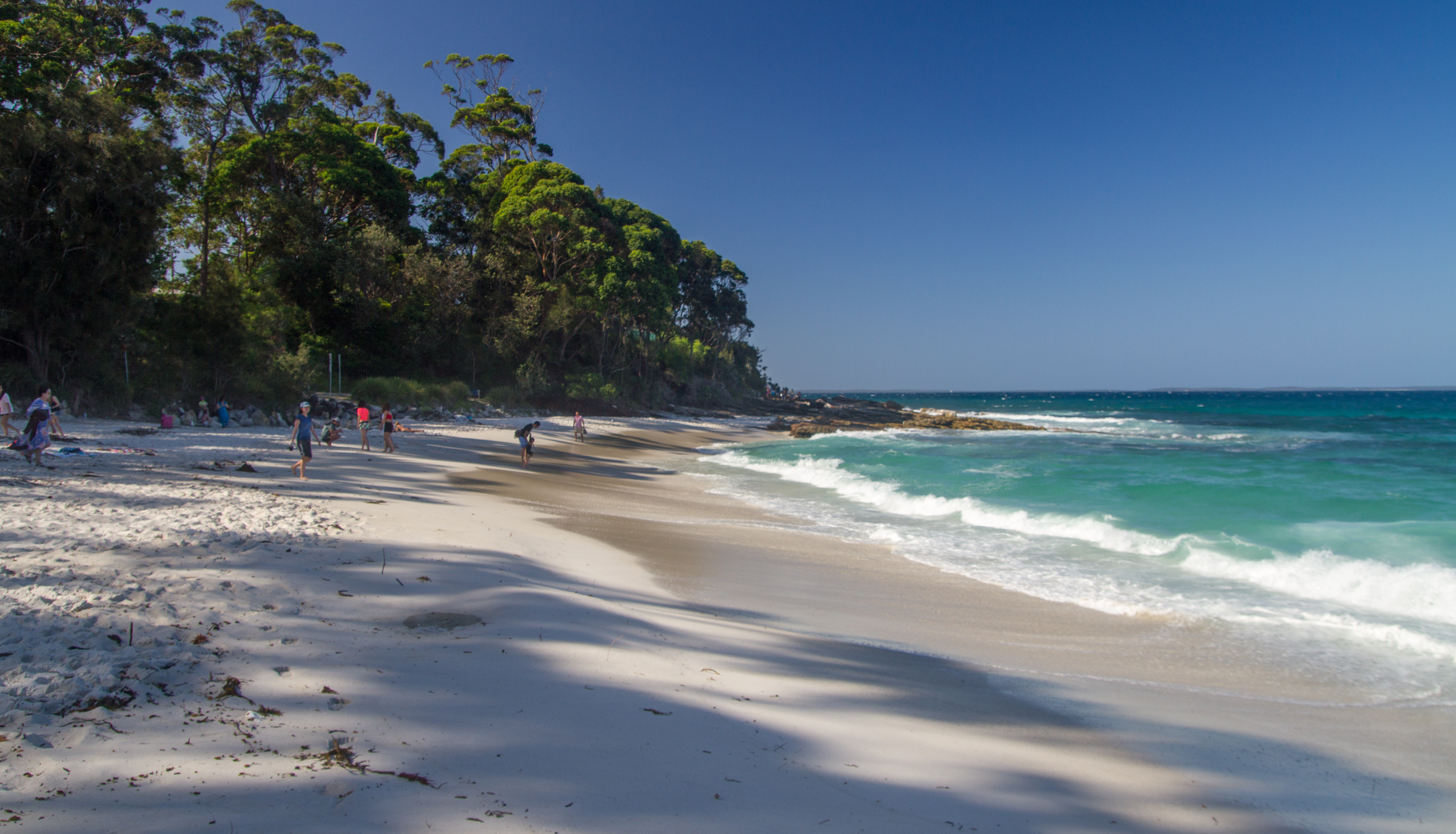

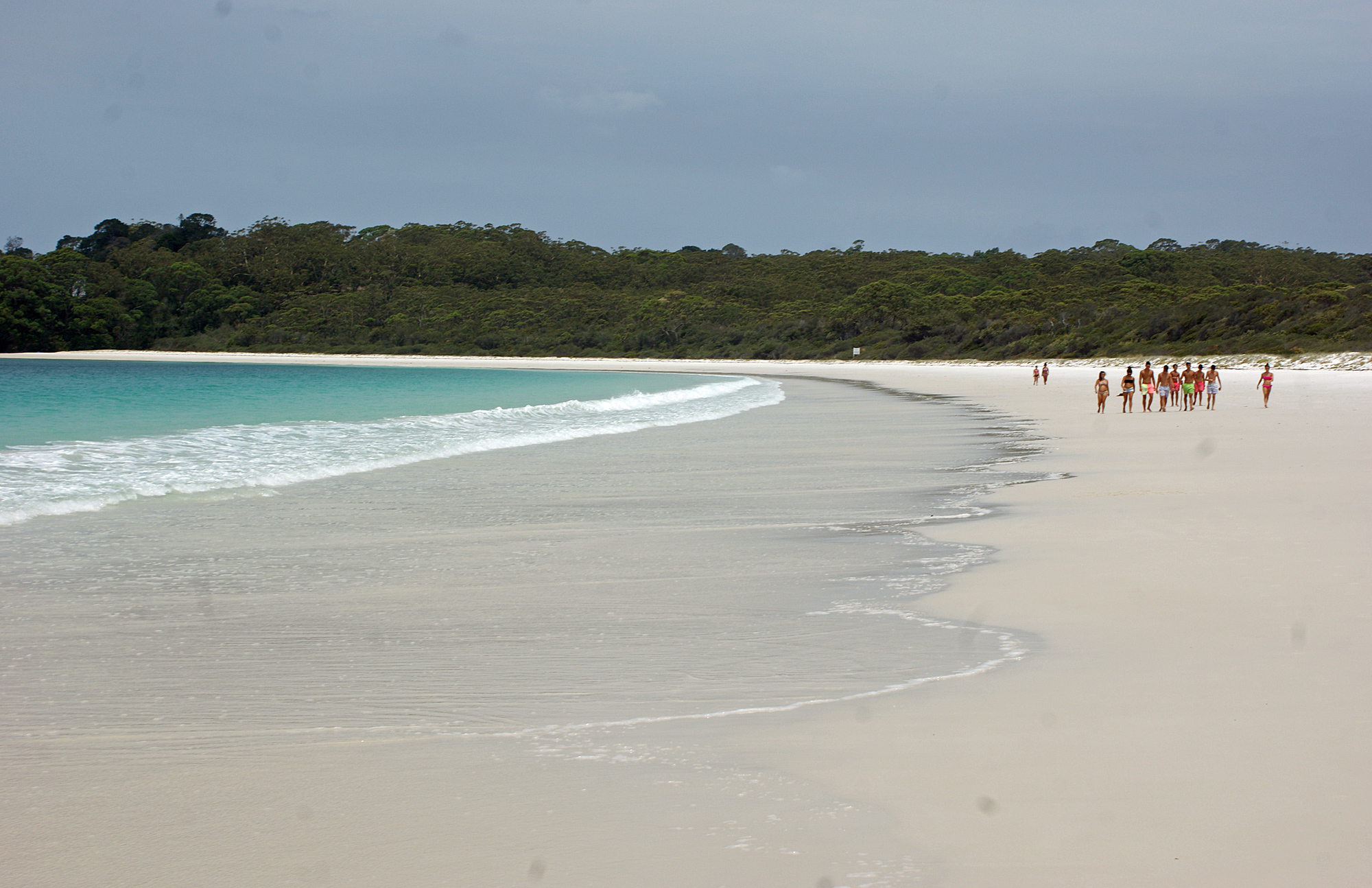

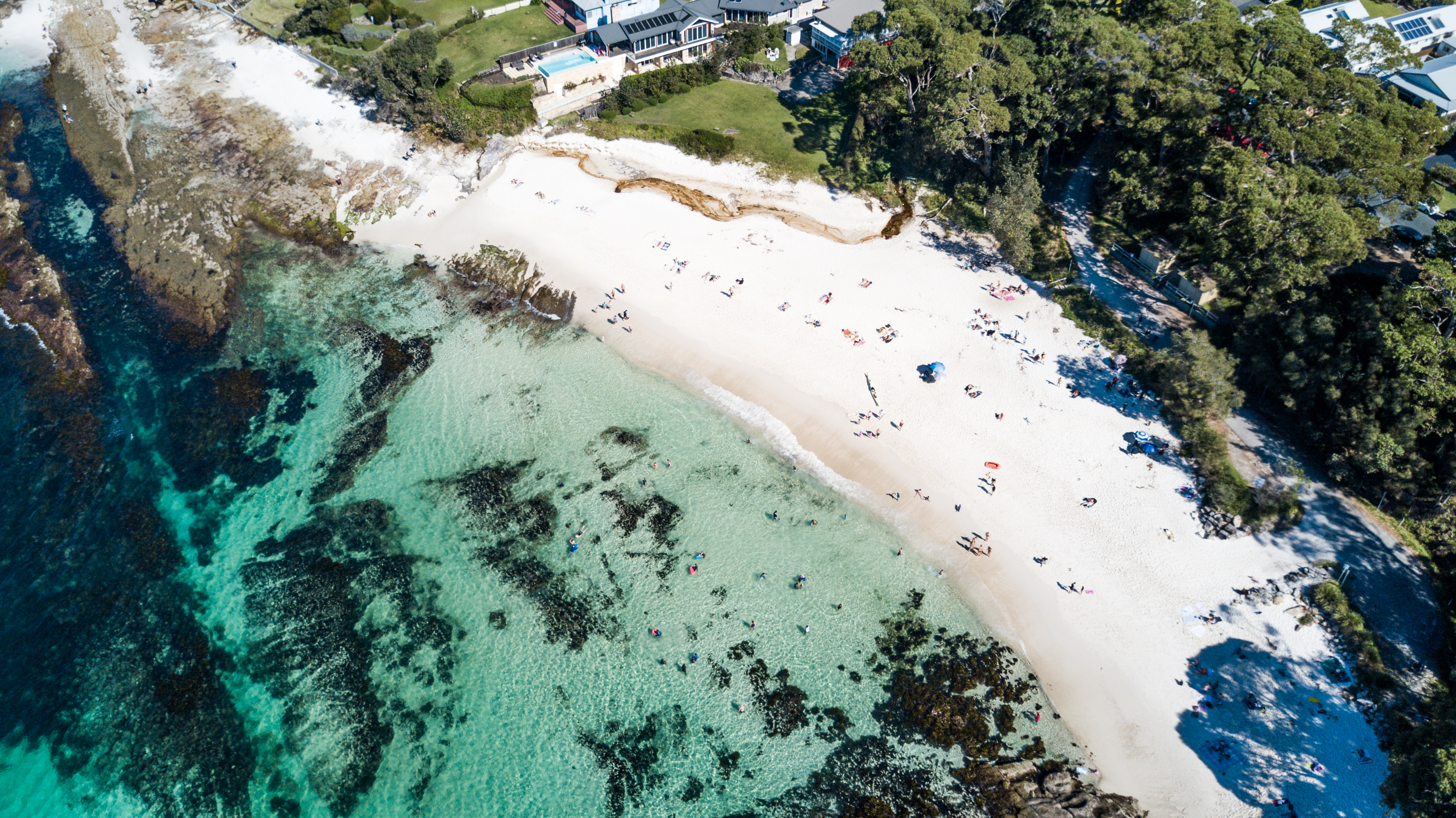

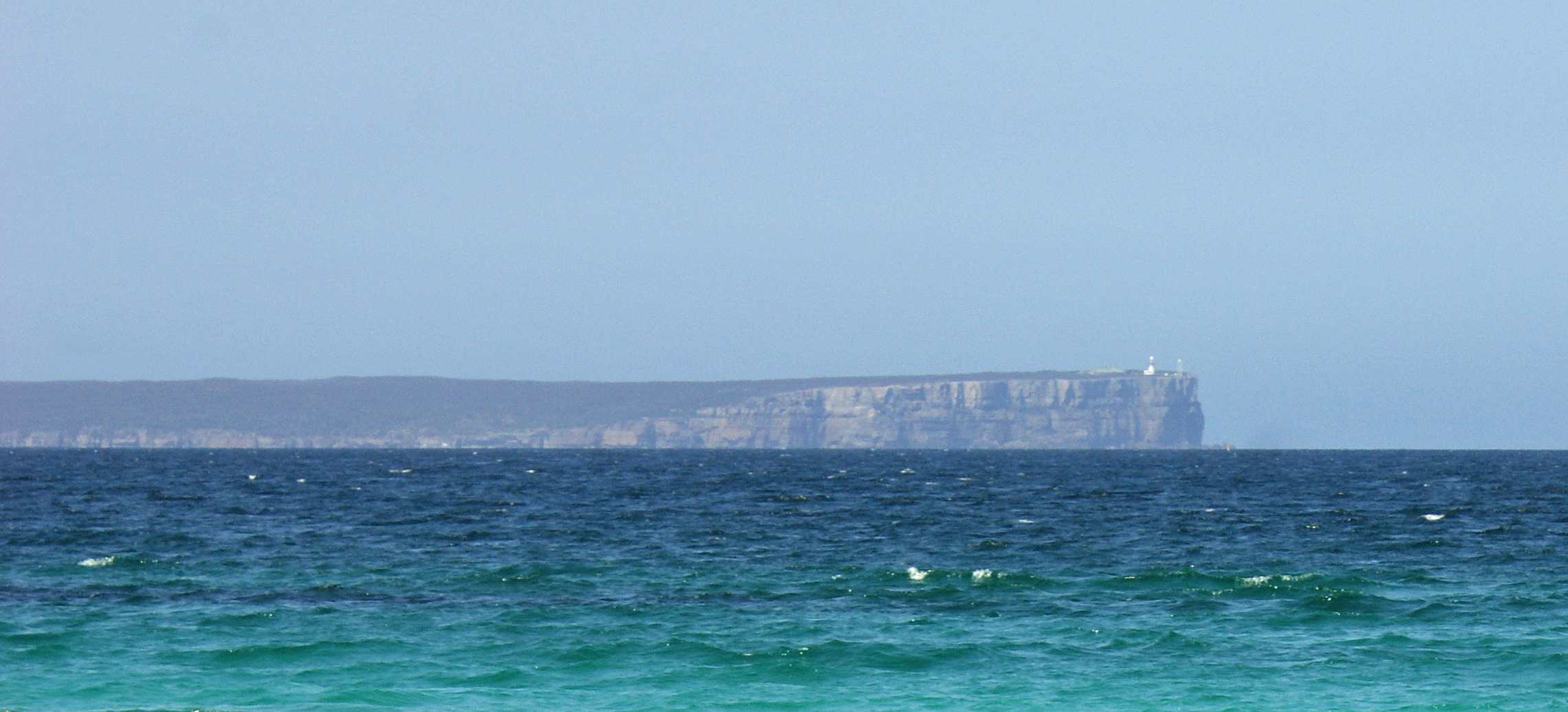

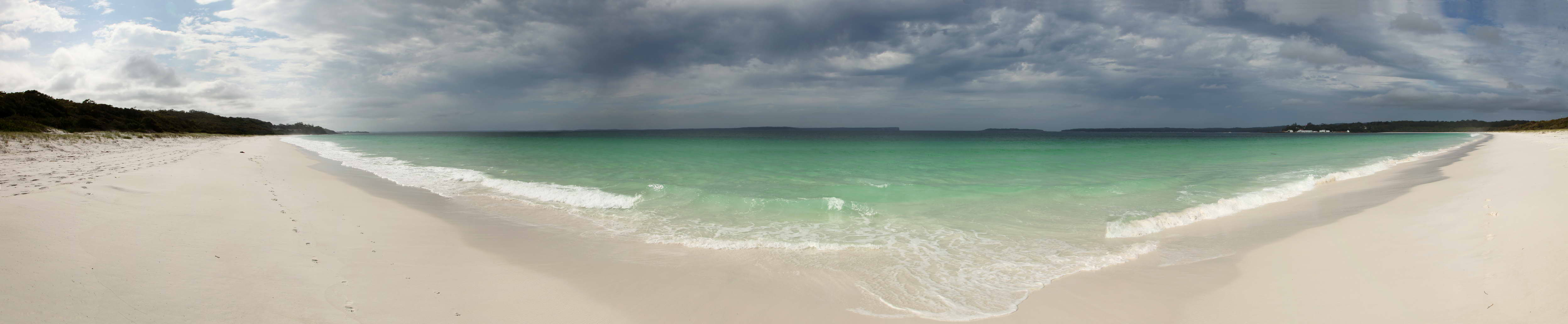

== See also ==
- Callala Beach, a beach to the north in Jervis Bay also featuring white sands and aqua waters
- Lucky Bay, a beach in Western Australia which also claims to have the "whitest sand"
- Whitehaven Beach, a white sandy beach in Queensland
