= Jerrawangala National Park =

Australian national park

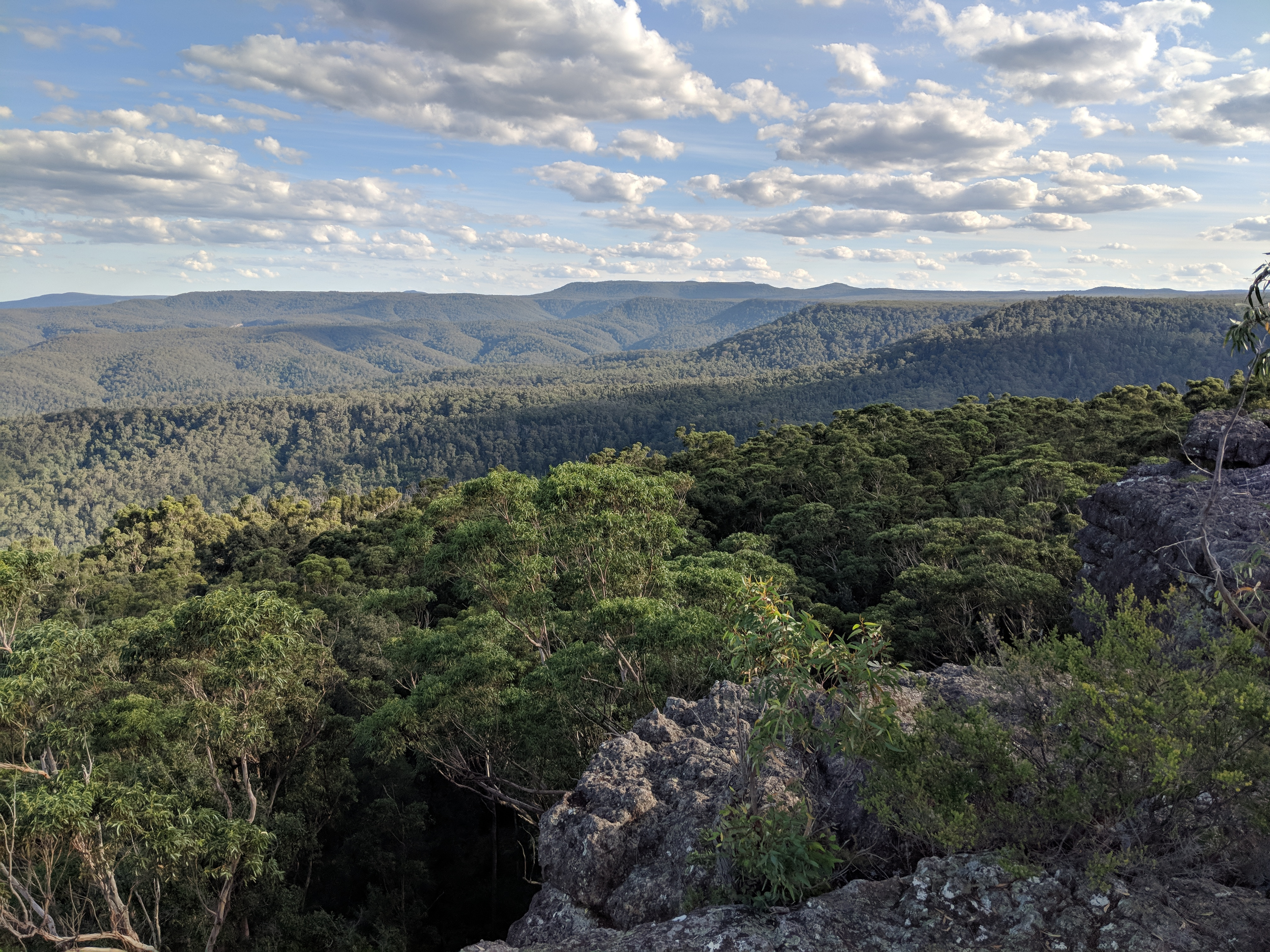

- Location within New South Wales
- Type: National park
- Location: New South Wales, Australia
- Nearest town: Jerrawangala
- Coordinates: 35.06°S 150.44°E
- Website: www.nationalparks.nsw.gov.au

Jerrawangala National Park is located in New South Wales, Australia in the South Coast region. It is home to several endangered species and many different species of vertebrate. In 2013, the park attracted attention when several large, illegal cannabis plantations were found in the middle of the park; police had to winch their way in with helicopters to confiscate some of the plants.

== Wildlife ==
A wide variety of vertebrates have been reported from the park, including, according to the NSW National Parks & Wildlife Service, 14 species of amphibians, 19 mammals, 23 reptiles, and nearly 60 different species of birds. Several endangered species, both animal and plant, are found in the park, notably including rare orchids such as leek orchids. The endangered giant burrowing frog is also found there. Bat populations in the park are such that one study captured 38 individuals in five different species in just one night.

The park is at moderate risk of dangerous bushfires; it was severely affected by the 2001 bushfire season. Nearly all of the park was impacted by the 2019-20 bushfire season, which was unprecedentedly large and catastrophic.

== Cannabis incident ==
In January 2013, police officers found and seized a total of $279,000 (AUD) worth of cannabis plants, being grown deep in the national park, west of the town of Sussex Inlet. Cannabis cultivation for personal use or without a licence is illegal in New South Wales, and is an imprisonable offence.

The first two plantations were found on 21 January by Nowra police officers and the Rural Fire Service. It was protected by rabbit traps, fences, and wire, and reportedly had several "established watering systems". On 22 January, five more cannabis plantations were found nearby, protected by more animal traps and even trip wires – the police had to winch their way in with helicopters to confiscate some of the plants.
