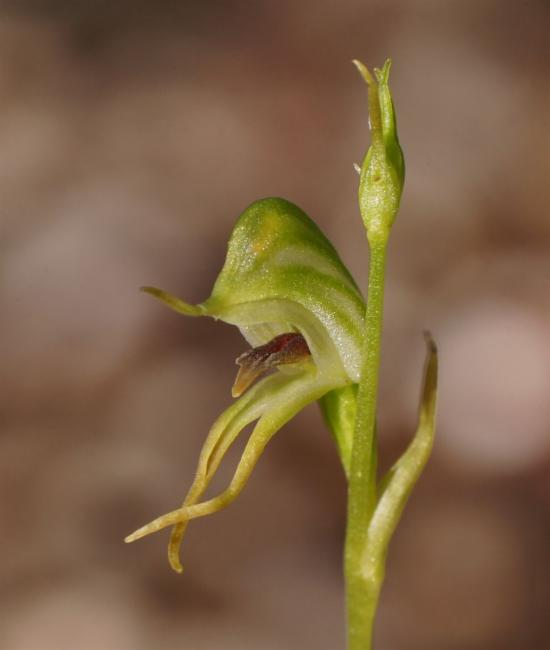
- Pterostylis daintreana in Vincentia

Scientific classification
- Kingdom: Plantae
- Clade: Tracheophytes
- Clade: Angiosperms
- Clade: Monocots
- Order: Asparagales
- Family: Orchidaceae
- Subfamily: Orchidoideae
- Tribe: Cranichideae
- Genus: Pterostylis
- Species: P. daintreeana

Binomial name
- Pterostylis daintreeana F.Muell. ex Benth.

Synonyms
- List: Oligochaetochilus daintreana Szlach. orth. var.; Oligochaetochilus daintreeanus (F.Muell. ex Benth.) Szlach.; Pharochilum daintreanum D.L.Jones & M.A.Clem. orth. var.; Pharochilum daintreeanum (F.Muell. ex Benth.) D.L.Jones & M.A.Clem.; Pterostylis daintreana Benth. orth. var.; Pterostylis daintreyana F.Muell. orth. var.

= Pterostylis daintreeana =

Daintree's greenhood

Species of orchid

Pterostylis daintreeana, commonly known as Daintree's greenhood, is a species of orchid endemic to eastern Australia. The non-flowering plants have a rosette of leaves on short stalks but flowering plants have up to ten flowers with rosettes on the side of the flowering spike. The flowers are translucent white with dark green lines and long, downcurved lateral sepals.

== Description ==
Pterostylis daintreeana is a terrestrial, perennial, deciduous, herb with an underground tuber and when not flowering, a rosette of between three and ten egg-shaped to heart-shaped leaves 6–24 mm (0.2–0.9 in) long and 4–13 mm (0.2–0.5 in) wide. Flowering plants have a one or two rosettes on the side of the flowering stem 100–300 mm (4–10 in) high with between three and ten flowers and three to five stem leaves. The flowers are 14–17 mm (0.6–0.7 in) long and 4–5 mm (0.16–0.20 in) wide and translucent white with dark green markings. The dorsal sepal and petals are fused, forming a hood or "galea" over the column. The dorsal sepal has a thread-like tip 3–4 mm (0.1–0.2 in) long. The lateral sepals are joined near their bases then curve downwards with narrow ends 7–8 mm (0.28–0.31 in) long and parallel to each other. The labellum is about 4 mm (0.2 in) long, 2 mm (0.08 in) wide and dark brown with two large side lobes. Flowering occurs from January to July.

== Taxonomy and naming ==
Pterostylis daintreeana was first formally described in 1873 by George Bentham from an unpublished description by Ferdinand von Mueller, of a specimen collected by Richard Daintree near Sydney. The description was published in Flora Australiensis. The specific epithet (daintreana) honours the collector of the type specimen.

== Distribution and habitat ==
Daintree's greenhood grows on the coast and tablelands of New South Wales and southern Queensland among small shrubs or on mossy rocks.
