= Old Erowal Bay =

- Town
- Coordinates: 35°05′21″S 150°39′00″E
- Country: Australia
- State: New South Wales
- Region: South Coast
- LGA: City of Shoalhaven
- Location: 196 km (122 mi) S of Sydney; 27 km (17 mi) S of Nowra

Government
  - State electorate: South Coast
  - Federal division: Gilmore

Population
  - Total: 1,038 (2016 census)
- Postcode: 2540
- County: St Vincent
- Parish: Bherwerre
Localities around Old Erowal Bay
Worrowing Heights	Worrowing Heights	Worrowing Heights
Worrowing Heights	Old Erowal Bay	Worrowing Heights
Worrowing Heights	St Georges Basin	Erowal Bay

Old Erowal Bay is a locality in the City of Shoalhaven in New South Wales, Australia. It lies southwest of Vincentia, which is on Jervis Bay, on the northern shore of St Georges Basin. At the 2016 census, it had a population of 1,038.
