= Bay and Basin FM =

Bay and Basin 92.7FM
Sanctuary Point, New South Wales; Australia
- Broadcast area: Jervis Bay/St. Georges Basin, New South Wales South Coast
- Frequency: FM: 92.7 MHz

Programming
- Format: Freeform
- Affiliations: CBAA

Ownership
- Owner: BCR Communities; (BCR Communities)

History
- First air date: July 2006
- Call sign meaning: 2 Bay And Basin

Technical information
- Class: Community
- ERP: 100 w Omidirectional
- Transmitter coordinates: 35°6′S 150°37′E

Links
- Website: https://www.927fm.com.au

Bay and Basin 92.7FM (call sign: 2BAB) is a permanent licensed community radio station based in Sanctuary Point, on the New South Wales South Coast, Australia. It is licensed to serve the towns of Vincentia, Sanctuary Point, Huskisson, St Georges Basin and Basin View and surrounding villages, on the frequency of 92.7 FM. The signal can be received from Gerringong to Ulladulla.

== Overview ==
The station is locally managed by BCR Communities formerly Bay and Basin Community Resources, a not-for-profit charitable organisation (www.bcrcommunities.com) based in the Bay & Basin region, Shoalhaven and Illawarra. Original locally produced programming is presented by volunteer announcers, whilst other programs from Australian based community stations are shared via the Community Radio Network. The station conducts outside broadcasts for community events and fundraisers.

== Programming ==
An eclectic format prevails, with volunteer presenters selecting their own music. The station has a strong focus on partnering with local schools to provide Youth radio and school based radio programs.

The station broadcasts 24/7 and webstreams live and has an active program of outside broadcasts.
