= Wandandian, New South Wales =

Wandandian
- Town
- Coordinates: 35°5′S 150°30′E
- Country: Australia
- State: New South Wales
- LGA: City of Shoalhaven
- Location: 30 km (19 mi) S of Nowra; 199 km (124 mi) S of Sydney

Government
  - State electorate: South Coast
  - Federal division: Gilmore

Population
  - Total: 326 (2016 census)
- Postcode: 2540
Localities around Wandandian
Jerrawangala	Tomerong	Bewong
Jerrawangala	Wandandian	Basin View
Jerrawangala	Tullarwalla	Tullarwalla

Wandandian is a small village on the South Coast of New South Wales, Australia. It is located in the City of Shoalhaven on the Princes Highway about 30 kilometres south of Nowra.

Wandandian was first established as a Postal District in 1860, and has a rich history. The village takes its name from the Wandandian people, the traditional owners of much of the land now known as the City of Shoalhaven.

The village is home to Kladis Estate Winery.
