= Berrara =

Berrara New South Wales
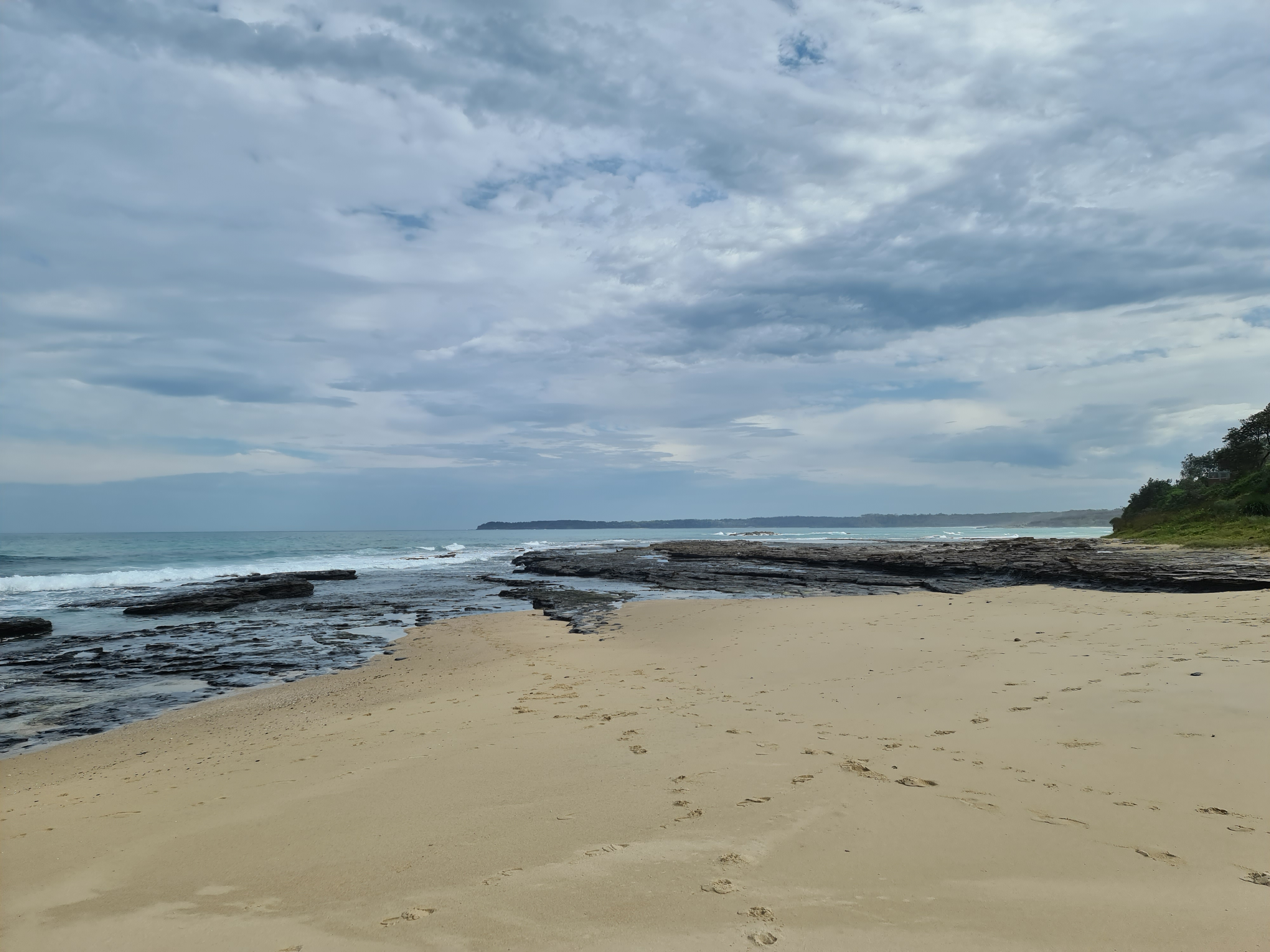
- Berrara Beach

- Coordinates: 35°12′18″S 150°33′08″E
- Population: 333 (SAL 2021)
- Postcode(s): 2540
- Location: 48 km (30 mi) S of Nowra; 208 km (129 mi) S of Sydney
- LGA(s): City of Shoalhaven
- County: St Vincent
- Parish: Cudmirrah
- State electorate(s): South Coast
- Federal division(s): Gilmore
Localities around Berrara:
	Cudmirrah
Mondayong	Berrara
		Tasman Sea

Berrara is a small coastal town in the City of Shoalhaven in New South Wales, Australia. It is located 8 km south of Sussex Inlet on the Tasman Sea and Berrara Creek. At the 2016 census, it had a population of 297.
