= Jerrawangala =

- Town
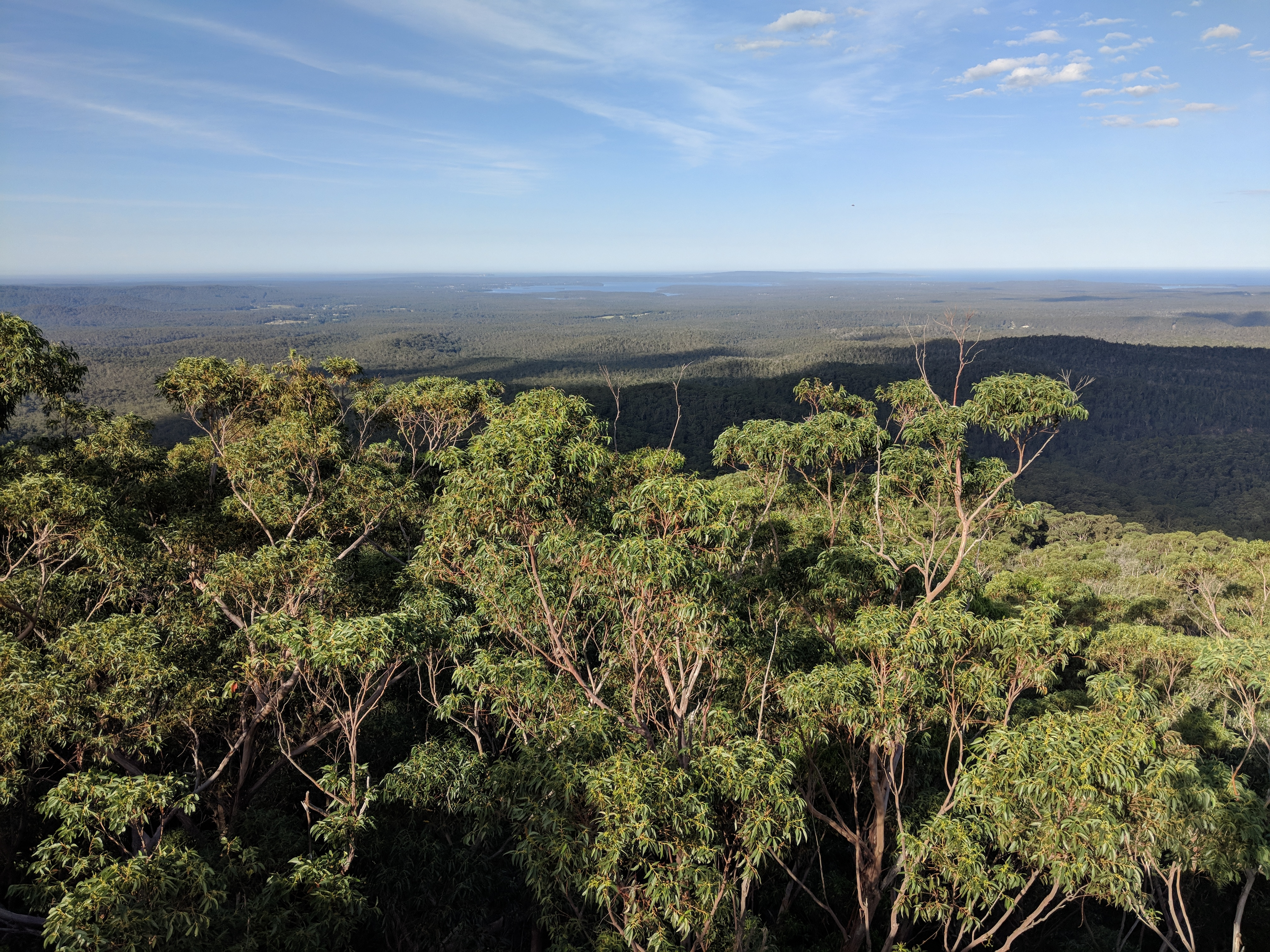
- Sussex Inlet from Jerrawangala lookout

- Coordinates: 35°04′13″S 150°26′20″E
- Country: Australia
- State: New South Wales
- Region: South Coast
- LGA: City of Shoalhaven
- Location: 35 km (22 mi) S of Nowra; 32 km (20 mi) N of Ulladulla; 197 km (122 mi) E of Canberra; 205 km (127 mi) S of Sydney

Government
  - State electorate: South Coast
  - Federal division: Gilmore
- Elevation: 122 m (400 ft)

Population
  - Total: 70 (2016 census)
- Postcode: 2622
- County: St Vincent
- Parish: Jerrawangala; Farnham
Localities around Jerrawangala
Yalwal	Yerriyong	Tomerong
Boolijah	Jerrawangala	Wandandian
Tianjara	Twelve Mile Peg	Tullarwalla

Jerrawangala is a locality in the City of Shoalhaven in New South Wales, Australia. It consists of a small settlement on the Princes Highway south of Nowra and a large unpopulated area to the northwest that lies on both sides of the Braidwood Road between Nowra and Nerriga. It is about 35 kilometres south of Nowra and about 205 km south of Sydney. Jerrawangala is fairly rugged sandstone country and largely consists of forest. Much of it lies within the Jerrawangala National Park or state forests. Jerrawangala lookout is located to the east of the Braidwood Road. At the 2016 census, it had a population of 70.

Part of the Braidwood Road through Jerrawangala, part of the access road to Jerrawangala lookout, and the modern-day Wandean Road were built originally as part of The Wool Road in 1841.
