= Vincentia, New South Wales =

Vincentia
- Town
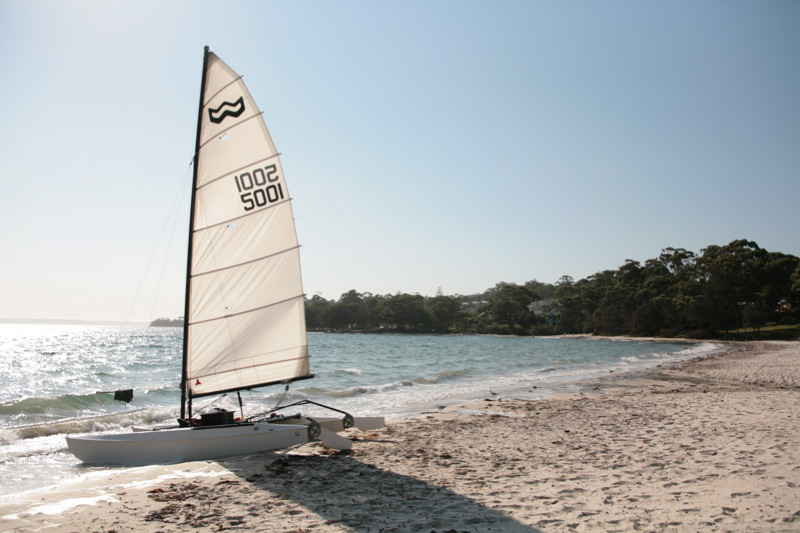
- A boat on Collingwood beach.

- Coordinates: 35°04′36″S 150°40′25″E
- Country: Australia
- State: New South Wales
- Region: South Coast
- LGA: City of Shoalhaven

Government
  - State electorate: South Coast
  - Federal division: Gilmore

Population
  - Total: 2,705 (UCL 2021)
- Postcode: 2540
- County: St Vincent
- Parish: Bherwerre
Localities around Vincentia
Huskisson	Huskisson	Tasman Sea
Worrowing Heights	Vincentia	Tasman Sea
Old Erowal Bay	Erowal Bay	Hyams Beach

Vincentia is a town in New South Wales, Australia in the City of Shoalhaven, on the shores of Jervis Bay. It is roughly 25 kilometres (16 mi) southeast of Nowra, and approximately 200 kilometres (120 mi) south of Sydney. At the 2016 census, the population of Vincentia was 6,686. It is also a tourist spot with a beach area featuring white sand and a number of motels.

The village itself has grown over the past decade, with a new district centre and housing development being built from 2014–2017, Vincentia HomeCo.

== History ==
The traditional owners of the area around Vincentia are a group of Yuin, members of what early European settlers called "the Jervis Bay tribe", known as Wandandian people. They spoke Dharamba, which was probably the northernmost dialect of the Dhurga language.

Vincentia was originally known as "South Huskisson" and later as "The Old Township". It was founded as a seaport in 1841, and was the terminus of The Wool Road from Nerriga. South Huskisson lay on land originally owned by Edward Deas Thompson and was a "private town". In 1842, a wharf was built near the current location of the Holden Street boat ramp.

The road and port were not successful. By 1867, the town of South Huskisson was deserted, any buildings were just ruins by 1885, and there was virtually nothing remaining of the old town by the 1930s. Many street names from The Old Township are still in use and much of the original street plan remains.

In 1952, developer Henry Halloran renamed the township Vincentia, after St Vincent County, which was named after John Jervis, 1st Earl of St Vincent. John Jervis was created Earl of St Vincent as a result of his victory at the battle of Cape St Vincent. Jervis Bay was also named after him.

In the 1950s and 1960s, the town was reborn as a holiday destination, following land sales for holiday homes, also known as "weekenders".
