= Parish of Bherwerre =

Coordinates: 35°04′S 150°39′E

Bherwerre Parish
- Cadastral division
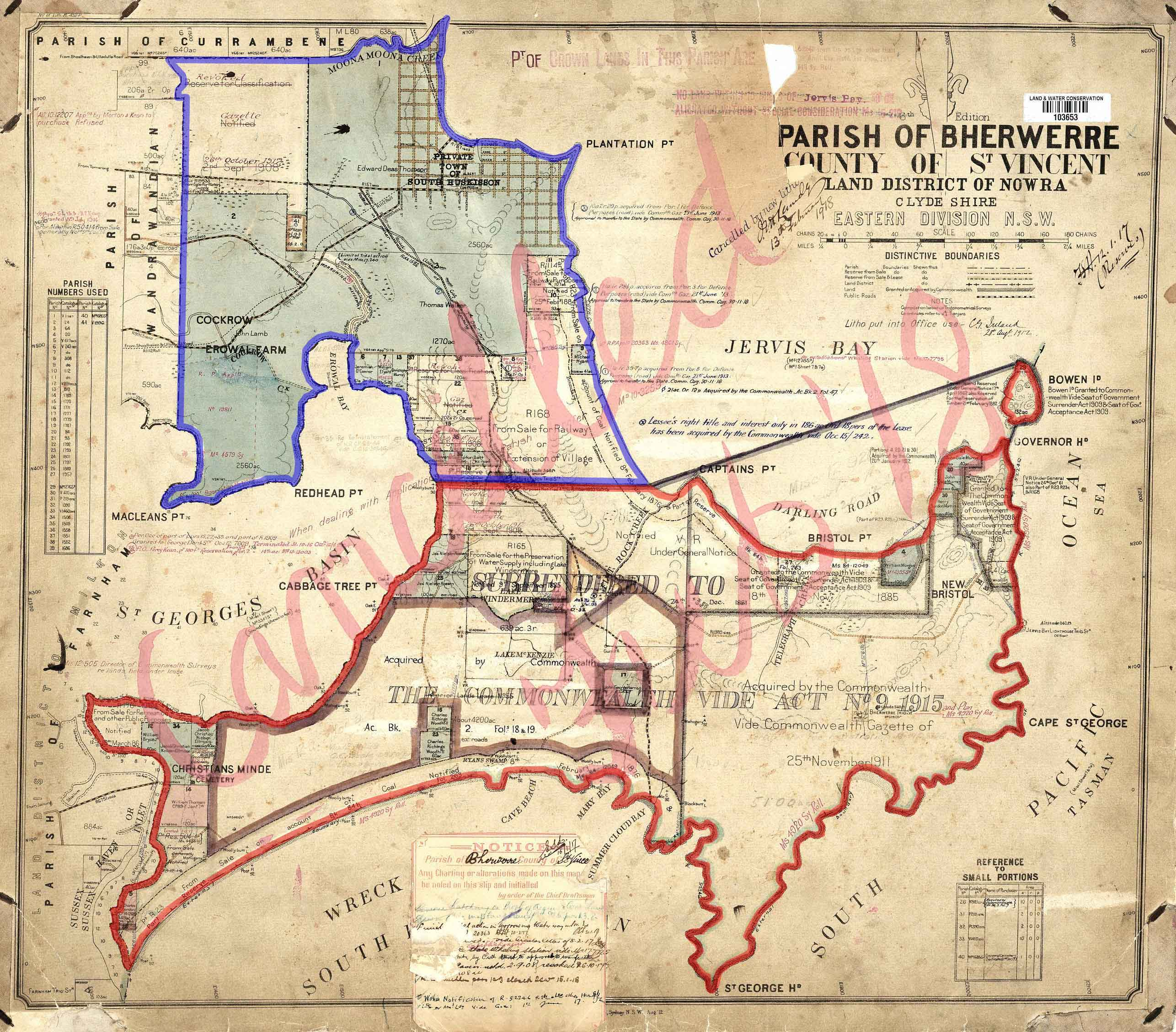
- 1912 cadastral map with highlights: Boundary of the parish since 1915 Parts of the parish which were transferred to the Commonwealth for the Jervis Bay Territory in 1915.
- Country: Australia
- State: New South Wales
- LGA: Shoalhaven
- County: St Vincent
- Division: Eastern
Lands administrative divisions around Bherwerre Parish
Currambene	Jervis Bay	Pacific Ocean
Wandrawandian	Bherwerre Parish	Pacific Ocean
Farnham	Pacific Ocean	Pacific Ocean

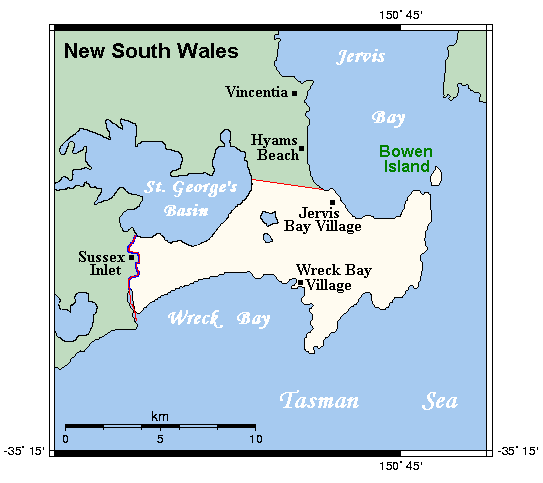
Map showing the Jervis Bay Territory (white), formerly in the Parish of Bherwerre. Part of the area to the north is currently in the parish (green).

The Parish of Bherwerre is a parish of the County of St Vincent in New South Wales which formerly included the area that is now the Jervis Bay Territory, which was transferred to the Commonwealth of Australia in 1915. Because of this, the parish is now less than half the size it was in the nineteenth century. The Jervis Bay Territory Acceptance Act 1915 mentions that 18,000 acres (7,300 ha) of the parish were transferred to the Commonwealth. The Seat of Government Acceptance Act 1909 mentions that three separate parcels in the parish were planned to be transferred to the Commonwealth from Bherwerre, along with land in other nearby parishes, although the actual land transfer in 1915 was only made up of land in the Parish of Bherwerre. The land mentioned in the 1909 act was a 2-square-mile (5.2 km^{2}) portion, a 412-acre (167 ha) portion, and the 132 acres (53 ha) of Bowen Island. At the time, the parish was located in Clyde Shire.

The parish now includes the towns of Sanctuary Point and Vincentia, and also the village of Hyams Beach. The parish is bounded by St Georges Basin at Erowal Bay in the south, the Jervis Bay Territory in the south-east, Jervis Bay in the east and Moona Moona creek in the north.
