= Sussex Inlet =

- Town
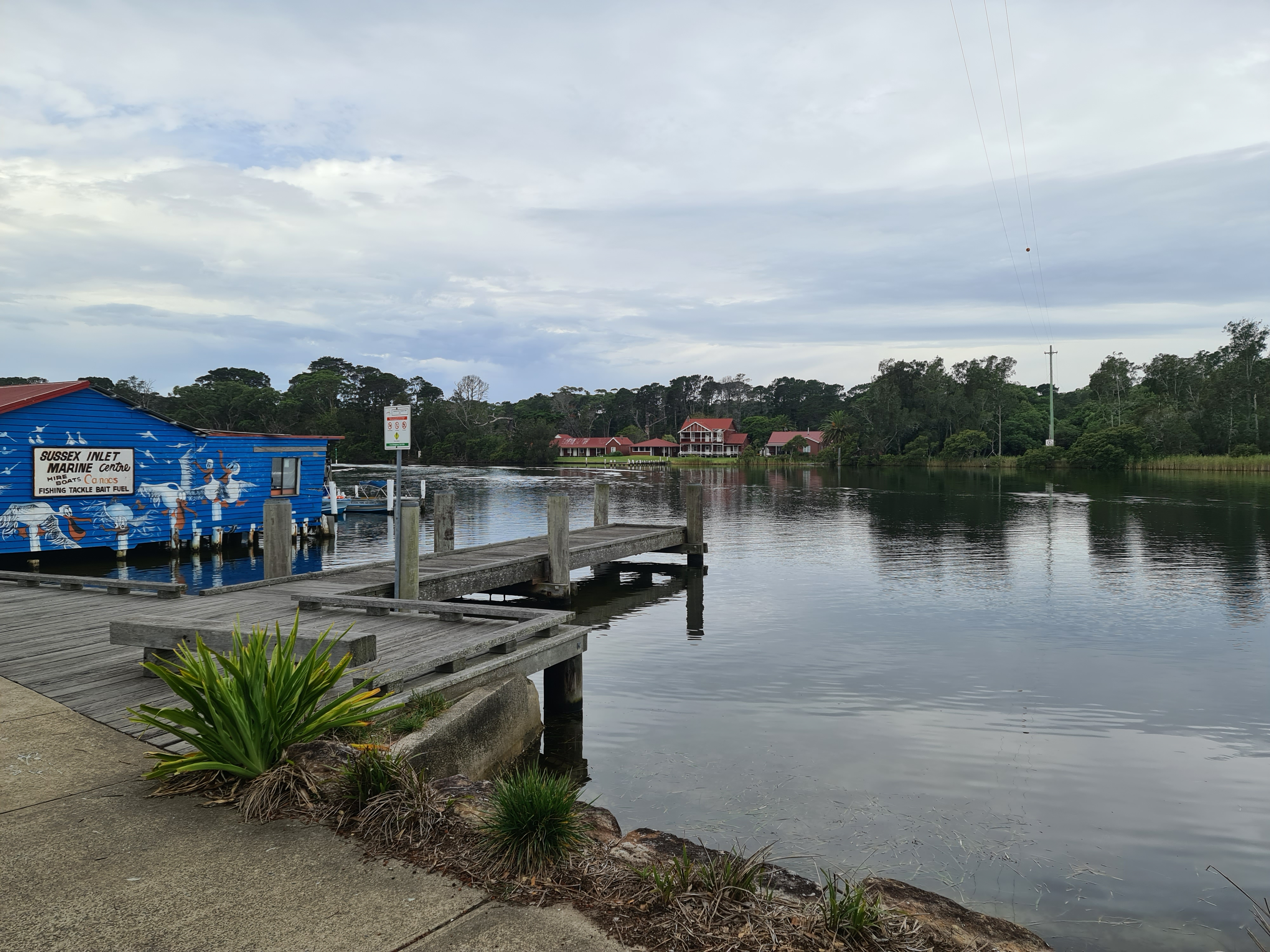
- Looking over Sussex Inlet to Jervis Bay Territory

- Coordinates: 35°09′S 150°34′E
- Country: Australia
- State: New South Wales
- Region: South Coast
- LGA: City of Shoalhaven
- Location: 40 km (25 mi) S of Nowra; 200 km (120 mi) S of Sydney

Government
  - State electorate: South Coast
  - Federal division: Gilmore

Population
  - Total: 3,659 (UCL 2021)
- Postcode: 2540
- County: St Vincent
- Parish: Farnham
Localities around Sussex Inlet
Tullarwalla	St Georges Basin
Mondayong	Sussex Inlet	Jervis Bay Territory
Swan Lake	Swanhaven	Tasman Sea

Sussex Inlet is a town in the South Coast region of New South Wales, Australia. The town lies on the west bank of the waterway called Sussex Inlet, which divides New South Wales from the Jervis Bay Territory. The town lies within the City of Shoalhaven.

As at the 2021 census, the population of the Sussex Inlet-Berrara area was 4,694.

== Geography ==
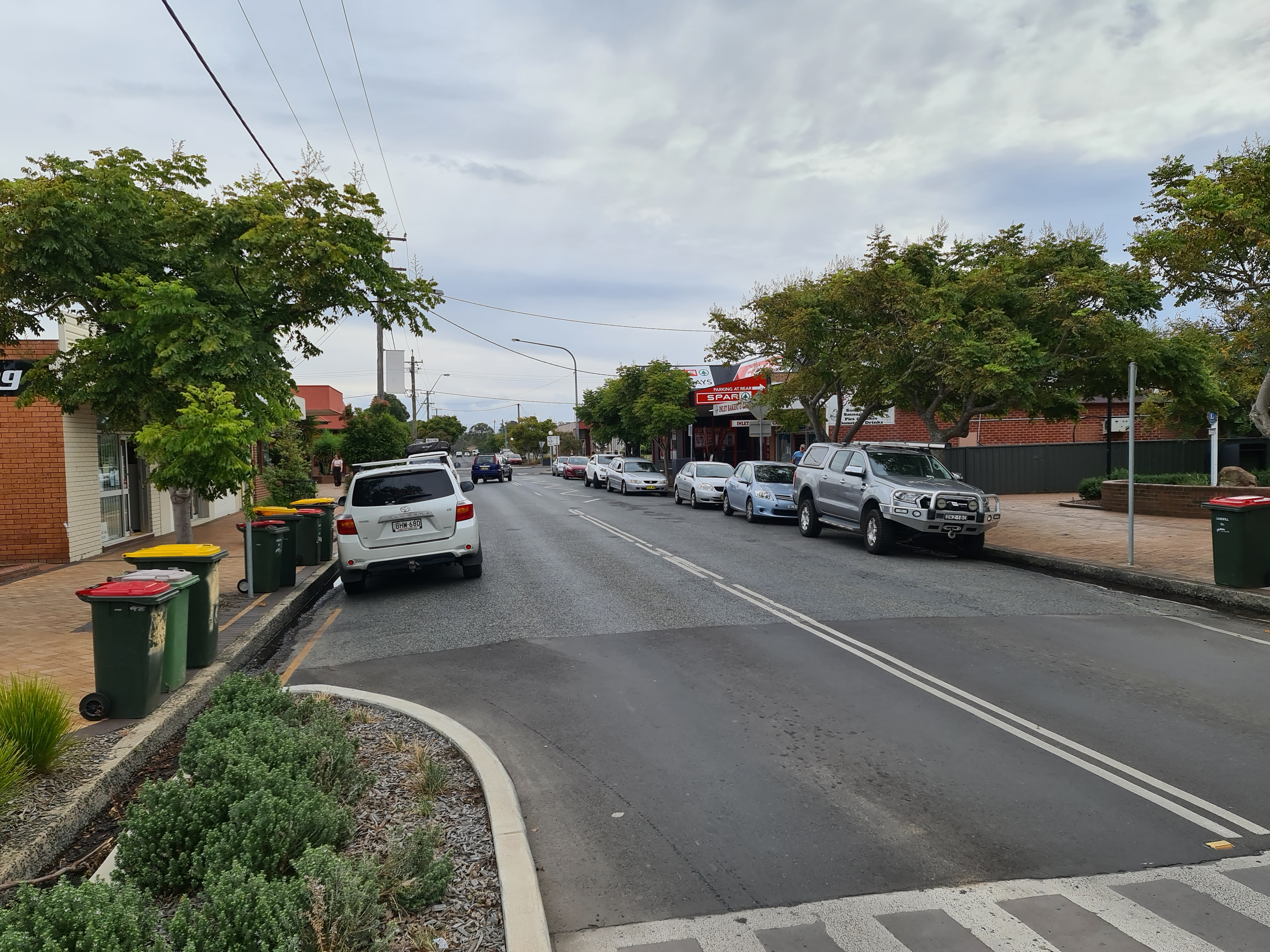
Main street

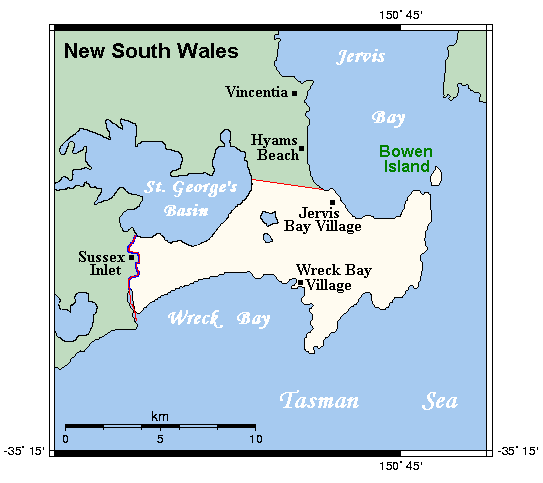
Jervis Bay Territory map showing Sussex Inlet.

The town of Sussex Inlet is located on the west bank of Sussex Inlet, a narrow inlet connecting Wreck Bay to the waterbody of St Georges Basin. The east bank of Sussex Inlet is the Booderee National Park.

Sussex Inlet is located roughly 150 km south of Sydney (203 km by road).

Jervis Bay Airport is located about 10 kilometres (6.2 mi) east of Sussex Inlet.
