= St Vincent County =

St. Vincent
- Cadastral division
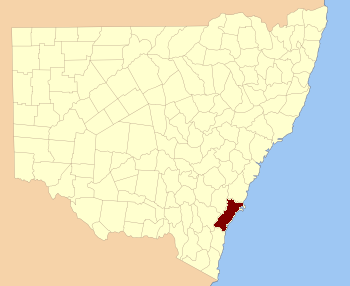
- Location in New South Wales
- Country: Australia
- State: Australian Capital Territory
Lands administrative divisions around St. Vincent
Argyle	Camden	Camden
Murray	St. Vincent	Pacific Ocean
Murray	Dampier	Pacific Ocean

St Vincent County was one of the original Nineteen Counties in New South Wales and is now one of the 141 cadastral divisions of New South Wales. It included the south coast area encompassing Batemans Bay, Ulladulla, Jervis Bay and inland to Braidwood. The Shoalhaven River is the boundary to the north and west, and the Deua River the boundary to the south.

St Vincent County was named in honour of John Jervis, 1st Earl of St Vincent (1735–1823), Admiral of the Fleet. The electoral district of United Counties of Murray and St Vincent and the electoral district of St Vincent were the first electoral districts for the area, between 1856 and 1859.

In 1852 it had an area of 1,704,844 acres (6,899.26 km^{2}) and population of 2,572.

== Parishes within this county ==
Land in the Parishes of Bherwerre, Beecroft, Farnham and Nowra was transferred to the Commonwealth government in 1915 to become the Jervis Bay Territory, as specified in the Seat of Government Acceptance Act 1909. A full list of parishes found within this county; their current LGA and mapping coordinates to the approximate centre of each location is as follows:

Parish	LGA	Coordinates
Albert	City of Shoalhaven	35°30′54″S 150°15′04″E
Araluen	Queanbeyan-Palerang Regional Council	35°37′54″S 149°48′04″E
Bateman	Eurobodalla Shire	35°45′54″S 150°12′04″E
Beecroft	City of Shoalhaven	35°01′54″S 150°49′04″E
Benandarah	Eurobodalla Shire	35°39′54″S 150°16′04″E
Bendoura	Queanbeyan-Palerang Regional Council	35°30′54″S 149°42′04″E
Bettowynd	Queanbeyan-Palerang Regional Council	35°42′54″S 149°46′04″E
Bherwerre	City of Shoalhaven	35°08′54″S 150°45′04″E
Bolaro	Eurobodalla Shire	35°39′54″S 150°00′04″E
Boolijah	City of Shoalhaven	35°02′54″S 150°21′04″E
Borimbadal	City of Shoalhaven	34°52′54″S 150°08′04″E
Boyle	Queanbeyan-Palerang Regional Council	35°29′54″S 149°45′04″E
Boyne	City of Shoalhaven	35°25′54″S 150°17′04″E
Braidwood	Queanbeyan-Palerang Regional Council	35°24′54″S 149°51′04″E
Broulee	Eurobodalla Shire	35°50′54″S 150°10′04″E
Bruce	Queanbeyan-Palerang Regional Council	35°21′54″S 149°45′04″E
Buangla	City of Shoalhaven	34°54′54″S 150°27′04″E
Buckenbowra	Eurobodalla Shire	35°44′54″S 150°00′04″E
Budawang	City of Shoalhaven	35°26′54″S 149°58′04″E
Bulee	City of Shoalhaven	34°59′54″S 150°08′04″E
Burrill	City of Shoalhaven	35°20′54″S 150°06′04″E
Clyde	Eurobodalla Shire	35°34′54″S 150°13′04″E
Coghill	Queanbeyan-Palerang Regional Council	35°29′54″S 149°50′04″E
Conjola	City of Shoalhaven	35°14′54″S 150°27′04″E
Coolumburra	City of Shoalhaven	35°02′54″S 150°06′04″E
Corang	Queanbeyan-Palerang Regional Council	35°12′54″S 150°07′04″E
Croobyar	City of Shoalhaven	35°21′54″S 150°18′04″E
Cudmirrah	City of Shoalhaven	35°10′54″S 150°30′04″E
Currambene	City of Shoalhaven	34°58′54″S 150°39′04″E
Currock	City of Shoalhaven	35°27′54″S 150°05′04″E
Currowan	Eurobodalla Shire	35°34′54″S 150°07′04″E
Danjera	City of Shoalhaven	34°57′54″S 150°22′04″E
Durran Durra	Queanbeyan-Palerang Regional Council	35°21′54″S 149°52′04″E
East Nelligen	Eurobodalla Shire	35°39′54″S 150°11′04″E
Elrington	Queanbeyan-Palerang Regional Council	35°32′54″S 149°45′04″E
Endrick	City of Shoalhaven	35°14′54″S 150°14′04″E
Ettrema	City of Shoalhaven	34°57′54″S 150°14′04″E
Farnham	City of Shoalhaven	35°07′54″S 150°30′04″E
Goba	Eurobodalla Shire	35°44′54″S 150°08′04″E
Jerrawangala	City of Shoalhaven	35°03′54″S 150°27′04″E
Jerricknorra	Queanbeyan-Palerang Regional Council	35°10′54″S 150°00′04″E
Kioloa	City of Shoalhaven	35°34′54″S 150°19′04″E
Little Forest	City of Shoalhaven	35°14′54″S 150°20′04″E
Marlowe	Queanbeyan-Palerang Regional Council	35°15′54″S 149°52′04″E
Meangora	Queanbeyan-Palerang Regional Council	35°04′54″S 150°00′04″E
Milo	Eurobodalla Shire	35°40′54″S 149°54′04″E
Mogendoura	Eurobodalla Shire	35°51′54″S 150°01′04″E
Mogood	City of Shoalhaven	35°28′54″S 150°11′04″E
Monga	Queanbeyan-Palerang Regional Council	35°29′54″S 149°56′04″E
Mongarlowe	Queanbeyan-Palerang Regional Council	35°20′54″S 150°00′04″E
Mullendaree	Eurobodalla Shire	35°48′54″S 150°03′04″E
Murrengenburg	City of Shoalhaven	35°32′54″S 150°00′04″E
Nowra	City of Shoalhaven	34°53′54″S 150°30′04″E
Numbaa	City of Shoalhaven	34°53′54″S 150°40′04″E
Percy	Queanbeyan-Palerang Regional Council	35°22′54″S 149°45′04″E
Quiera	City of Shoalhaven	34°56′24″S 150°12′04″E
Sassafras	City of Shoalhaven	35°07′54″S 150°13′04″E
Seymour	Queanbeyan-Palerang Regional Council	35°33′54″S 149°50′04″E
St. George	City of Shoalhaven	34°59′54″S 150°13′04″E
Tallaganda	Queanbeyan-Palerang Regional Council	35°39′54″S 149°41′04″E
Tallowal	City of Shoalhaven	34°52′54″S 150°13′04″E
Termeil	City of Shoalhaven	35°28′54″S 150°21′04″E
Tianjara	City of Shoalhaven	35°08′54″S 150°21′04″E
Tomaga	Eurobodalla Shire	35°51′54″S 150°07′04″E
Tomboye	Queanbeyan-Palerang Regional Council	35°14′54″S 149°57′04″E
Tomerong	City of Shoalhaven	34°58′54″S 150°29′04″E
Touga	City of Shoalhaven	34°54′54″S 150°07′04″E
Ulladulla	City of Shoalhaven	35°19′54″S 150°27′04″E
Wandrawandian	City of Shoalhaven	35°03′54″S 150°33′04″E
West Nelligen	Eurobodalla Shire	35°40′54″S 150°05′04″E
Wog Wog	Queanbeyan-Palerang Regional Council	35°15′54″S 150°02′04″E
Wollumboola	City of Shoalhaven	34°57′54″S 150°44′04″E
Woodburn	City of Shoalhaven	35°23′54″S 150°23′04″E
Yadboro	City of Shoalhaven	35°22′54″S 150°13′04″E
Yalwal	City of Shoalhaven	34°52′54″S 150°19′04″E
Yerriyong	City of Shoalhaven	34°57′54″S 150°27′04″E
