= Greenwell Point =

- Town
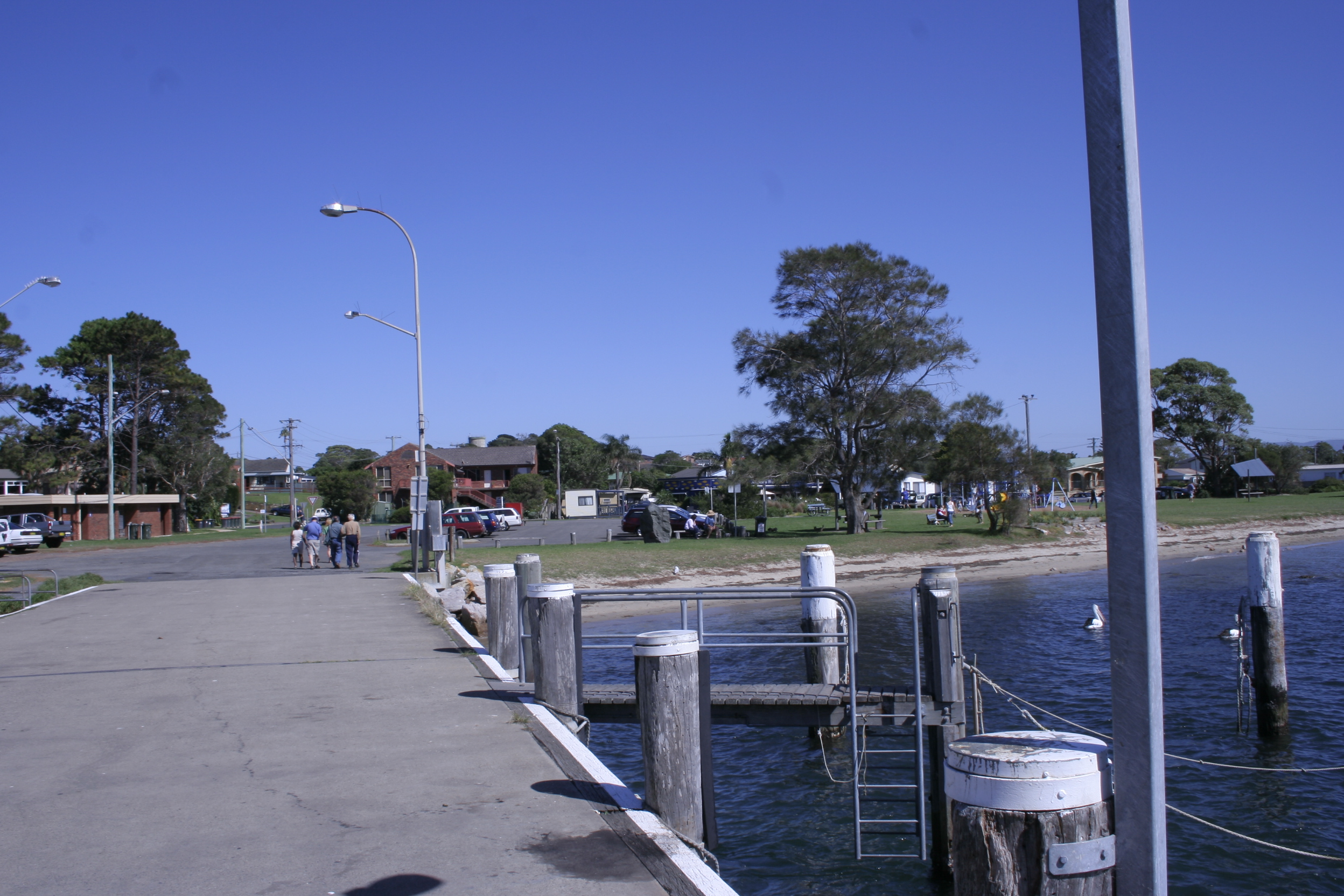
- Greenwell Point from the east

- Coordinates: 34°54′30″S 150°44′02″E
- Country: Australia
- State: New South Wales
- Region: South Coast
- LGA: City of Shoalhaven
- Location: 13 km (8.1 mi) E of Nowra; 76 km (47 mi) N of Ulladulla; 176 km (109 mi) S of Sydney

Government
  - State electorate: South Coast
  - Federal division: Gilmore
- Elevation: 8 m (26 ft)

Population
  - Total: 1,245 (2021 census)
- Postcode: 2540
- County: St Vincent
- Parish: Numbaa
Localities around Greenwell Point
Numbaa	Comerong Island	Comerong Island
Pyree	Greenwell Point	Orient Point
Pyree	Culburra Beach	Culburra Beach

Greenwell Point is a town in the Shoalhaven region of New South Wales, Australia. It is about 13 km east of Nowra on the South Coast. At the 2021 census, the town had a population of 1,245.
