= Pyree =

Locality in New South Wales, Australia

- Town
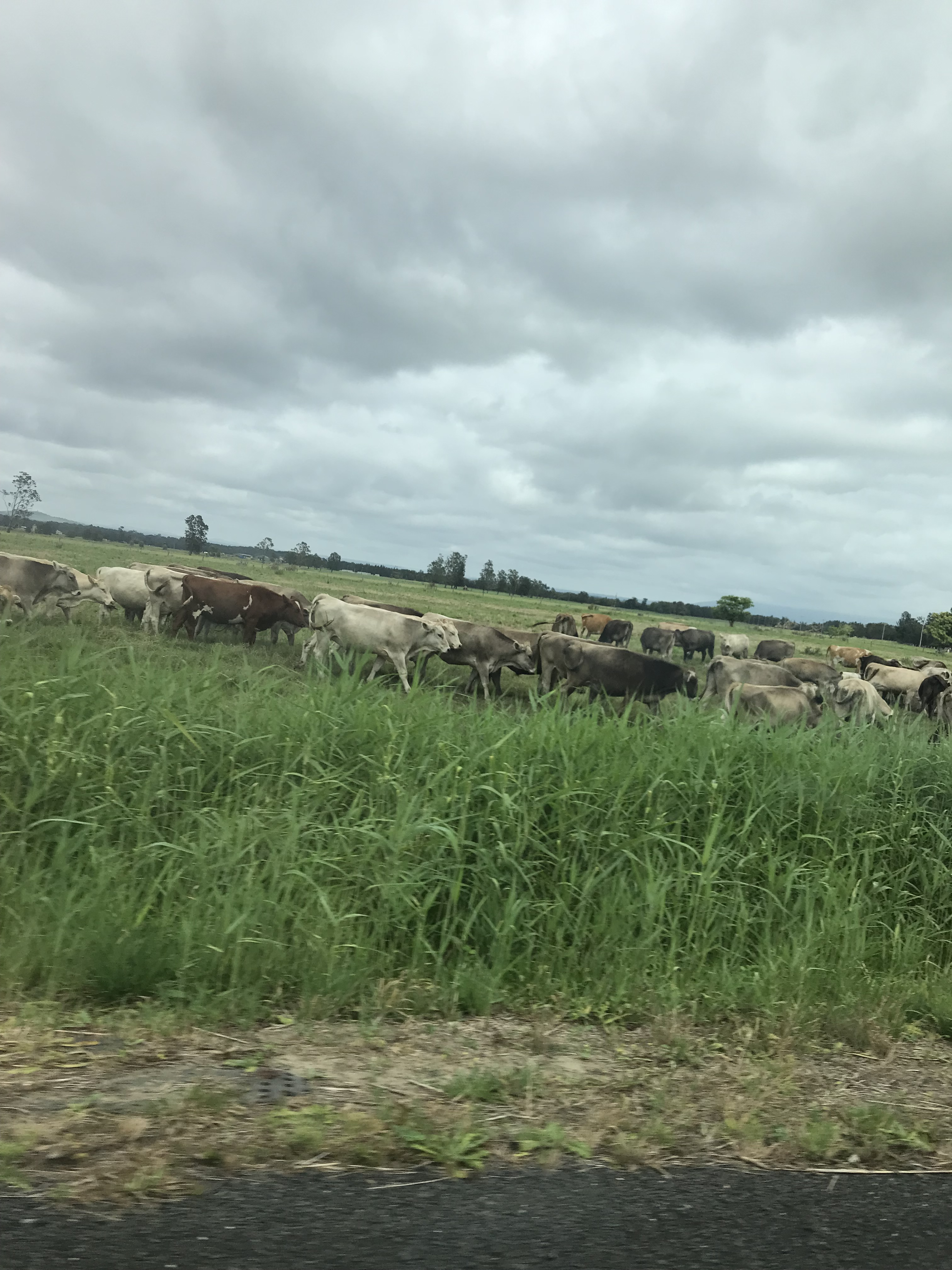

- Coordinates: 34°54′29″S 150°41′08″E
- Country: Australia
- State: New South Wales
- Region: South Coast
- LGA: City of Shoalhaven
- First People: Jerrinja
- Location: 9 km (5.6 mi) S of Nowra; 71 km (44 mi) N of Ulladulla; 171 km (106 mi) S of Sydney
- Established: 1830 (Mill)

Government
  - State electorate: South Coast
  - Federal division: Gilmore
- Elevation: 1 m (3.3 ft)

Population
  - Total: 110 (2021 census)
- Postcode: 2540
- County: St Vincent
- Parish: Numbaa
Localities around Pyree
Numbaa	Numbaa	Comerong Island
Brundee	Pyree	Greenwell Point
Mayfield	Wollumboola	Culburra Beach

Pyree is a farming locality in the Shoalhaven district of New South Wales, Australia. It lies on the Shoalhaven river Floodplain. It consists of a community hall and grounds which host a local farmers and craft market on the fourth Sunday of each month. It is the location of the Historic Jindyandy Mill.

== History ==
The district lies within the country of the Aboriginal Jerrinja peoples of the Yuin nation. The Aboriginal name Pyree means "a place of box trees".

Pyree was leased to Alexander Aberdeen in 1852. It was previously known as "Swamp Paddock" before being renamed to Pyree in 1910. However prior to 1910 it was still often called Pyree. The earliest known reference referring to "Pyree" is from 1867.

In 1860 a public school was opened on Greenwell Point road. However it was said to soon be in a ‘wretched state…the place is not fit for a stable’. In 1877 a new brick built School was made that operated until 1976.

In May 1869 a post office was established, a cricket club was established in 1888 and a football club was established in 1890.

== Jindyandy Mill ==
The Jindyandy Mill is a 3-story high convict built Grain Mill that now is at the center of the Jindyandy Mill Shopping Village. Which includes an antique store and a cafe.

In 1830 Jindyandy Mill was built using convict labour by Alexander Berry. It is one of the oldest convict built buildings south of Sydney. It is a Heritage listed site.
