= Orient Point, New South Wales =

Orient Point
- Town
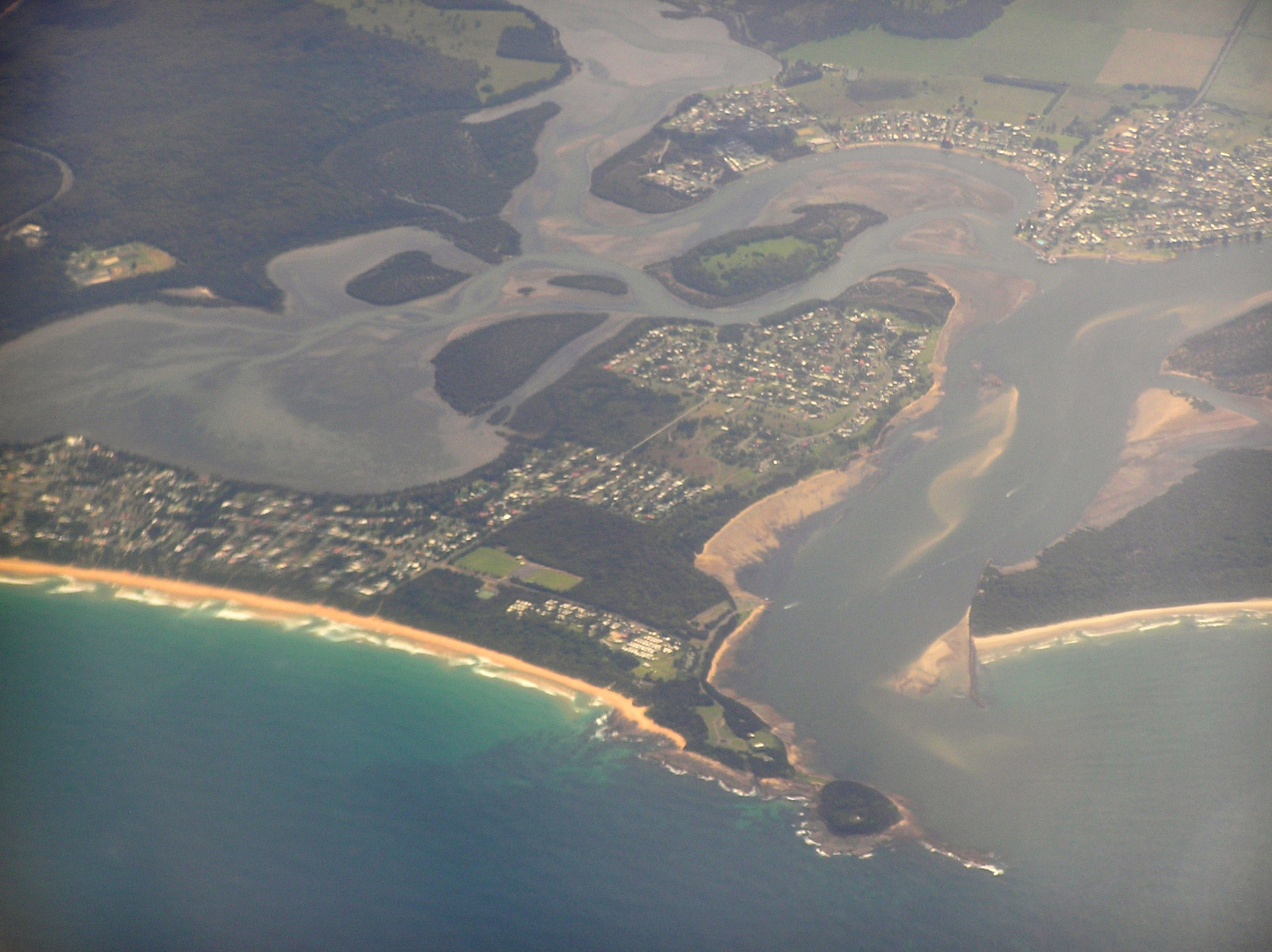
- Orient Point

- Coordinates: 34°54′43″S 150°44′37″E
- Country: Australia
- State: New South Wales
- Region: South Coast
- LGA: City of Shoalhaven
- Location: 182 km (113 mi) S of Sydney; 22 km (14 mi) SE of Nowra

Government
  - State electorate: South Coast
  - Federal division: Gilmore
- Elevation: 9 m (30 ft)

Population
  - Total: 629 (SAL 2021)
- Postcode: 2540
- County: St Vincent
- Parish: Wollumboola
Localities around Orient Point
Greenwell Point	Comerong Island	Tasman Sea
Greenwell Point	Orient Point	Culburra Beach
Culburra Beach	Culburra Beach	Culburra Beach

Orient Point is a small village in the Shoalhaven area of New South Wales, Australia. It is located on the southern side of the mouth of the Crookhaven River and adjoins the village of Culburra Beach to the south. The Jerrinja Aboriginal Mission is located near the village. At the 2016 census, Orient Point had a population of 611, of which approximately 120 people from the population are residents of the Jerrinja community.

== History ==
Traditionally and historically the land at Orient Point is part of the country belonging to the Jerrinja Aboriginal people.

A shepherd named Patrick Caffey, who worked for Alexander Berry, the man who gave his name to the nearby town of Berry, was probably the first to establish a farm at Orient Point.

Berry acquired 155 acres in the west part of the Crookhaven Peninsula in 1836, and moved Aboriginal and Māori workers there from his Coolangatta Estate in the 1840s. Crookhaven Park was established in 1879 as a recreation reserve in the eastern part.

Apart from a few farmers, the Jerrinja people remained the majority of the population living at Orient Point during the 19th and early 20th centuries.

In 1900 an Aboriginal Mission was established called Roseby Park which after 1966 was renamed Jerrinja. In 1978 the title deeds to the Mission land were given back to the Jerrinja community. The Jerrinja people at Orient Point were all moved to the Mission in the early 20th century.

In the 1910s, Henry Halloran acquired land near Roseby Park and Crookhaven reserve, intended to be part of his Saint Vincent City project. By 1928, his company was offering land for sale in “Orient Point Estate”, described as bounded on three sides by the harbor, opposite Greenwell Point, with access to the ocean beach through Roseby Park.

During the 1950s and 1960s more than 300 houses were built at Orient Point which up until that point had remained largely rural.

In January 1954, Shoalhaven Shire defined the "Orient Point Town Improvement District", alongside declarations of similar rate collection districts for Shoalhaven Heads, Nowra Town, Greenwell Point, and Bomaderry Town. Its extent corresponded to land portion 5 formerly owned by Alexander Berry, west of Crookhaven Park and the aboriginal mission.

The modern census suburbs-and-localities area for Orient Point (SAL13107) extends further east than the 1954 definition, to include the area of the former mission now managed by Jerrinja land council. It also encompasses the uninhabited islands south of the point. Crookhaven Park and residences eastward from Tern Street are allocated to Culburra Beach suburb.
