= The Vandyke Album =

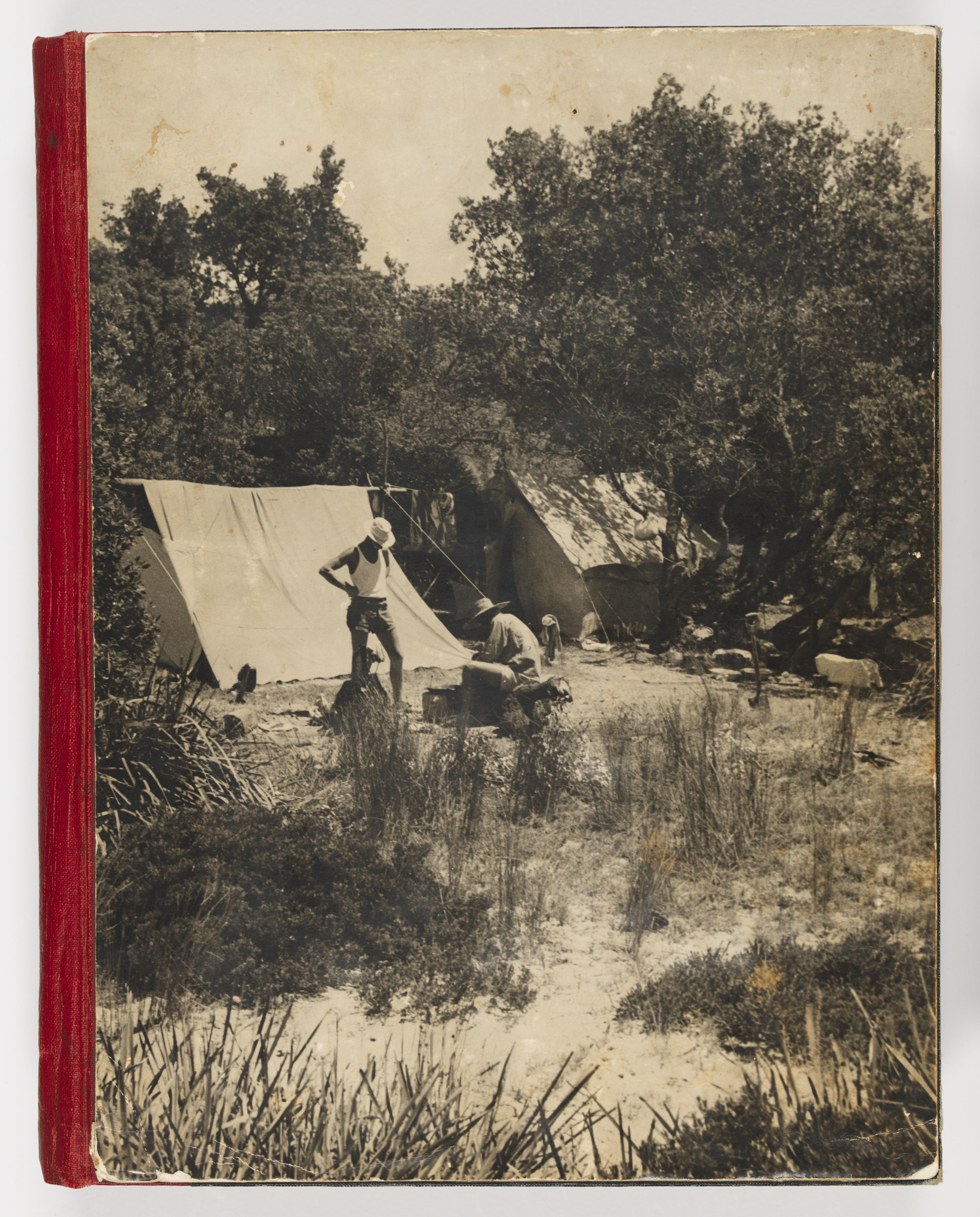
- Camping scene (front cover of Vandyke album), 1937
- Material: photographic silver gelatin prints, paper and pen
- Size: 30.7 x 22.6 cm or smaller, in album 31 x 24 cm
- Writing: English, handwritten titles
- Created: 1937
- Discovered: Donated through the Australian Government’s Cultural Gifts Program by Anthony C. Vandyke and John A. Vandyke, May 2012
- Present location: State Library of New South Wales
- Identification: SAFE/PXA 1951

The Vandyke Album is a 1937 album of photographs by Max Dupain and Olive Cotton in the collection of the State Library of New South Wales located in Sydney, New South Wales, Australia. It is of importance to Australia's photographic history, giving context to the Australian photograph The Sunbaker.

== Description ==
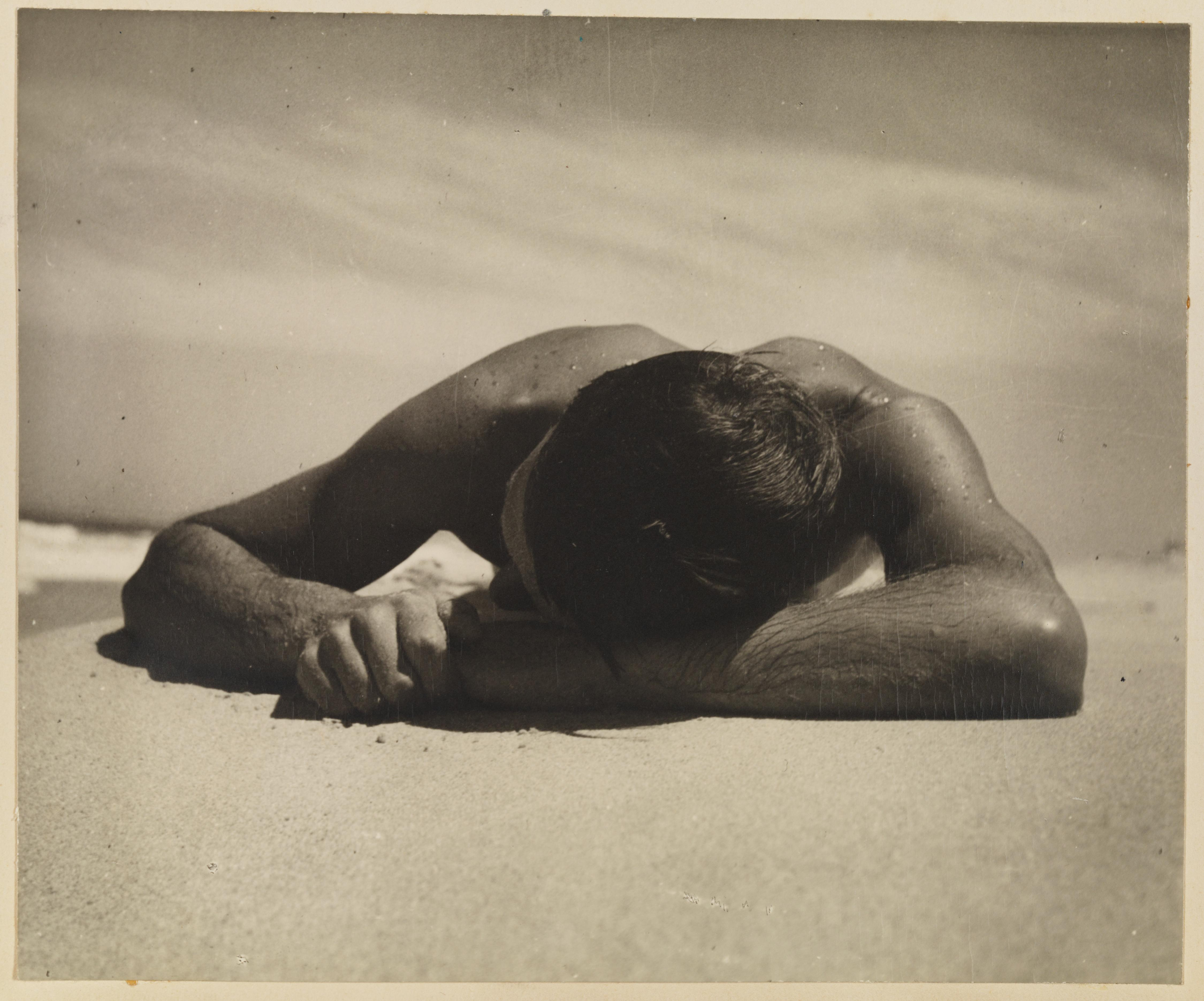
'Sunbaker' portrait of Harold Salvage, Culburra Beach, New South Wales, 1937, by Max Dupain

Taken around 1937 by the photographer Max Dupain (1911–1992), the Sunbaker entered Australia’s consciousness in the mid-1970s to rapidly become a symbol of the country’s identity and way of life. The camping album or Vandyke album is of exceptional importance in Australia's photographic history as it gives context to the iconic Australian photograph "The Sunbaker". The photograph of Harold Salvage, a British builder who was part of a group of friends on a surfing trip,

has become perhaps Australia's most famous photograph and a convenient symbol of our laid-back culture and love of the sea

Dupain's preferred version of the Sunbaker had Harold Savage's hands clasped, but the sole surviving print of this version is in the Vandyke album. The image in the album did not appear until Max Dupain’s first monograph was published in 1948, after this, the negative was lost. In the 1970s, Dupain printed a second version of the Sunbaker with Savage's hands unclasped. Initially not widely known, the Sunbaker gained fame when it was used as the poster for the opening exhibition of the Australian Centre for Photography in 1975. Over the years its ongoing resonance through numerous publications, exhibitions, examinations and reinterpretations has elevated the image to iconic status. There are thought to be about 200 signed prints of the better-known version where the right-hand lies with fingers extended on the sand.

The album contains a vintage print of the original 'Sunbaker' and 107 other vintage photographic prints taken on the 1937 camping trip by Max Dupain and Olive Cotton.

== Historical information ==
Chris Vandyke, an architect, had joined Dupain on camping trips to Culburra Beach on the south coast of New South Wales. He compiled an album of 108 original photographs by Dupain and his partner Olive Cotton. Owned by Anthony C. Vandyke and John A. Vandyke.

=== Location history ===
Chris Vandyke, Anthony C. Vandyke and John A. Vandyke, State Library of New South Wales.

=== Acquisition ===
Donated through the Australian Government’s Cultural Gifts Program to the State Library of New South Wales, May 2012.

== See also ==
- Photography in Australia
