= Terara =

- Suburb
- Coordinates: 34°51′45″S 150°37′42″E
- Country: Australia
- State: New South Wales
- Region: South Coast
- LGA: City of Shoalhaven
- Location: 160 km (99 mi) S of Sydney; 3 km (1.9 mi) NE of Nowra

Government
  - State electorate: South Coast
  - Federal division: Gilmore
- Elevation: 5 m (16 ft)

Population
  - Total: 305 (2021 census)
- Postcode: 2540
- County: St Vincent
- Parish: Numbaa
Suburbs around Terara
Bomaderry	Bolong	Bolong
Nowra	Terara	Numbaa
Nowra	Worrigee	Brundee

Terara is a suburb of Nowra in the City of Shoalhaven in New South Wales, Australia. It lies on the southern bank of the Shoalhaven about 3 km to the north-east of Nowra. At the 2021 census, it had a population of 305.

== History ==
Terara is the original settlement of Nowra before being flooding in 1862 and 1870 caused the township to move slightly west.
