= Brundee =

- Suburb
- Coordinates: 34°53′57″S 150°40′02″E
- Country: Australia
- State: New South Wales
- Region: South Coast
- LGA: City of Shoalhaven
- Location: 6 km (3.7 mi) E of Nowra; 66 km (41 mi) N of Ulladulla; 168 km (104 mi) S of Sydney

Government
  - State electorate: South Coast
  - Federal division: Gilmore
- Elevation: 2 m (6.6 ft)

Population
  - Total: 49 (2021 census)
- Postcode: 2540
- County: St Vincent
- Parish: Numbaa
Suburbs around Brundee
Terara	Numbaa	Numbaa
Worrigee	Brundee	Pyree
Worrigee	Mayfield	Pyree

Brundee is a locality in the City of Shoalhaven in New South Wales, Australia. It lies about 6 km east of Nowra. At the 2021 census, it had a population of 49.
