= Mayfield, New South Wales (Shoalhaven) =

Locality in New South Wales

Mayfield
- Suburb
- Interactive map of Mayfield
- Coordinates: 34°55′10″S 150°39′58″E
- Country: Australia
- State: New South Wales
- Region: South Coast
- LGA: Shoalhaven
- Location: 7 km (4.3 mi) SE of Nowra; 123 km (76 mi) SW of Sydney

Government
  - State electorate: South Coast
  - Federal division: Gilmore

Population
  - Total: 36 (2021)
- Postcode: 2540
Suburbs around Mayfield
Brundee	Brundee	Pyree
Worrigee	Mayfield	Pyree
Worrigee	Pyree	Pyree

Mayfield is a small Rural Locality located in the Shoalhaven Region of New South Wales. As of 2021 census it has a population of 36. The main road in the locality is Mayfield Road, which goes alongside the Crookhaven Creek and forms the eastern border of the locality. The Crookhaven River flows through the Locality. The locality is almost surrounded by Pyree on 3 sides. It is separated by Worrigee by Brundee Swamp. An alternative exit to the town is via the south, through the Pipeline Road, which goes into Comberton and the Currambene Forest.
