= Sunbaker =

1937 photograph by Max Dupain

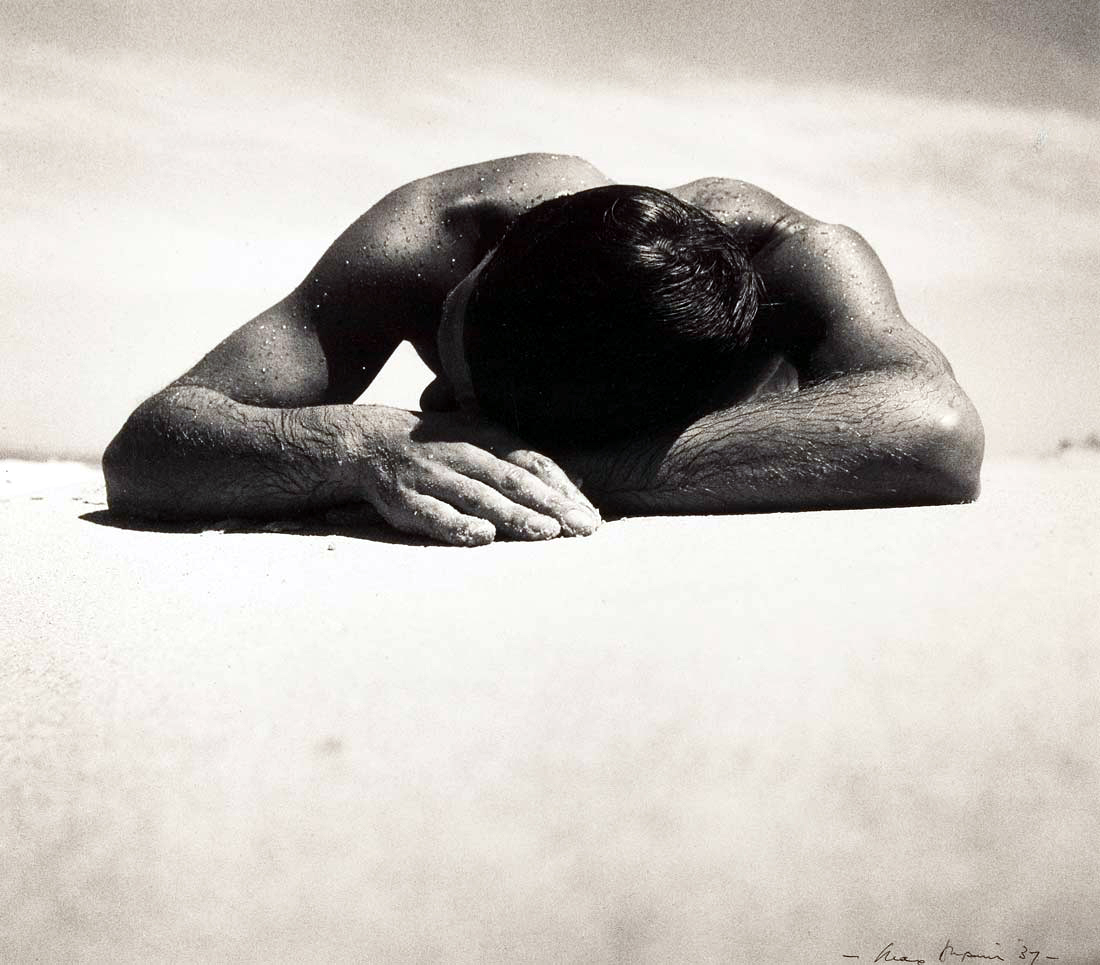
- Artist: Max Dupain
- Year: 1975 print from 1937 negative
- Type: Silver gelatin print

Sunbaker is a 1937 black-and-white photograph by Australian modernist photographer Max Dupain. It depicts the head and shoulders of a man lying on a beach in New South Wales, taken from a low angle. The photograph has been described as "quintessentially Australian", a "sort of icon of the Australian way of life", and "arguably the most widely recognised of all Australian photographs."

== Composition ==
It was a simple affair. We were camping down the south coast and one of my friends leapt out of the surf and slammed down onto the beach to have a sunbake – marvellous. We made the image and it's been around, I suppose as a sort of icon of the Australian way of life.

— Max Dupain

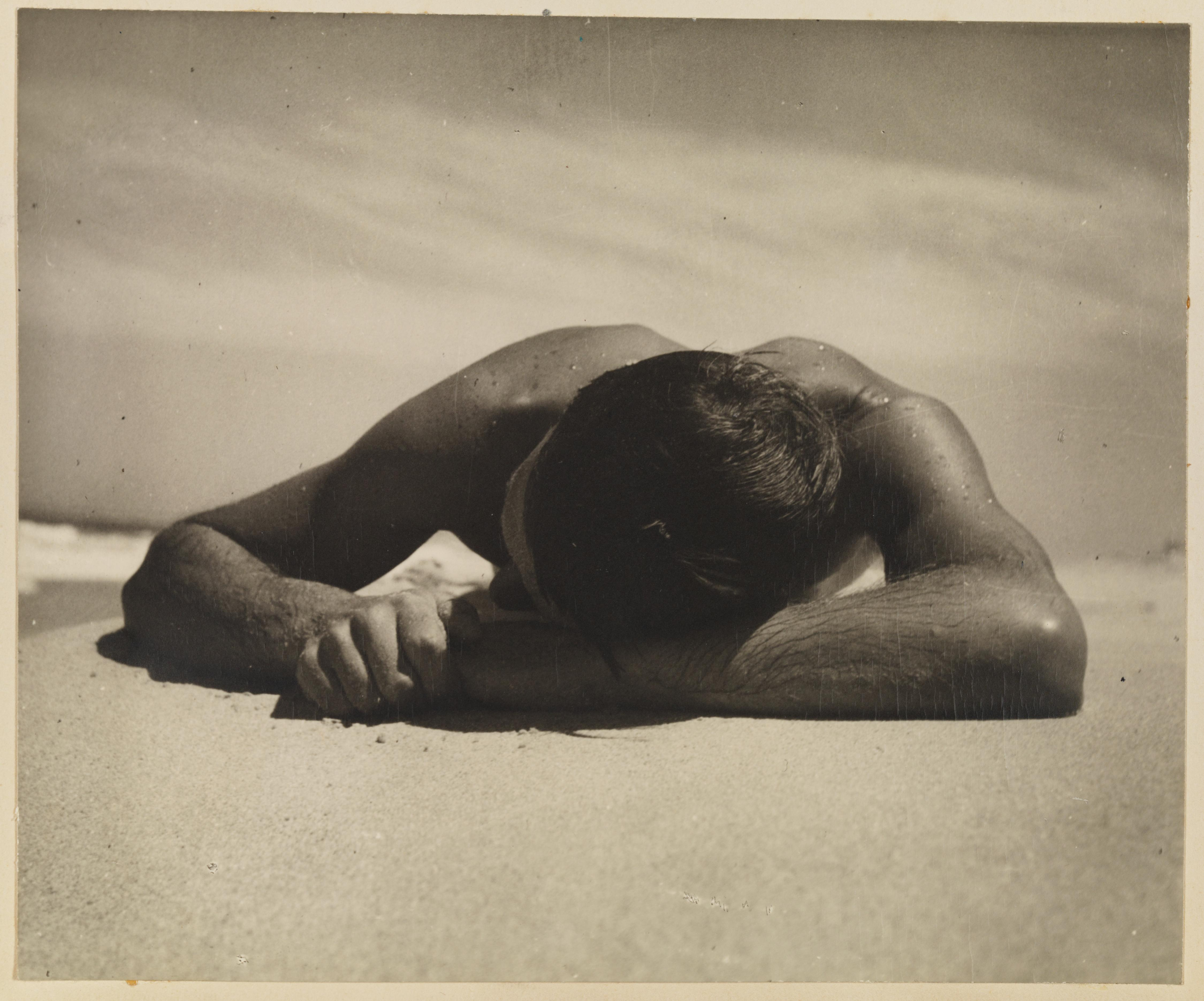
The first version of Sunbaker (note the clasped hand). Max Dupain, 1937–1948. Silver gelatin print from 1937 negative. State Library of New South Wales.

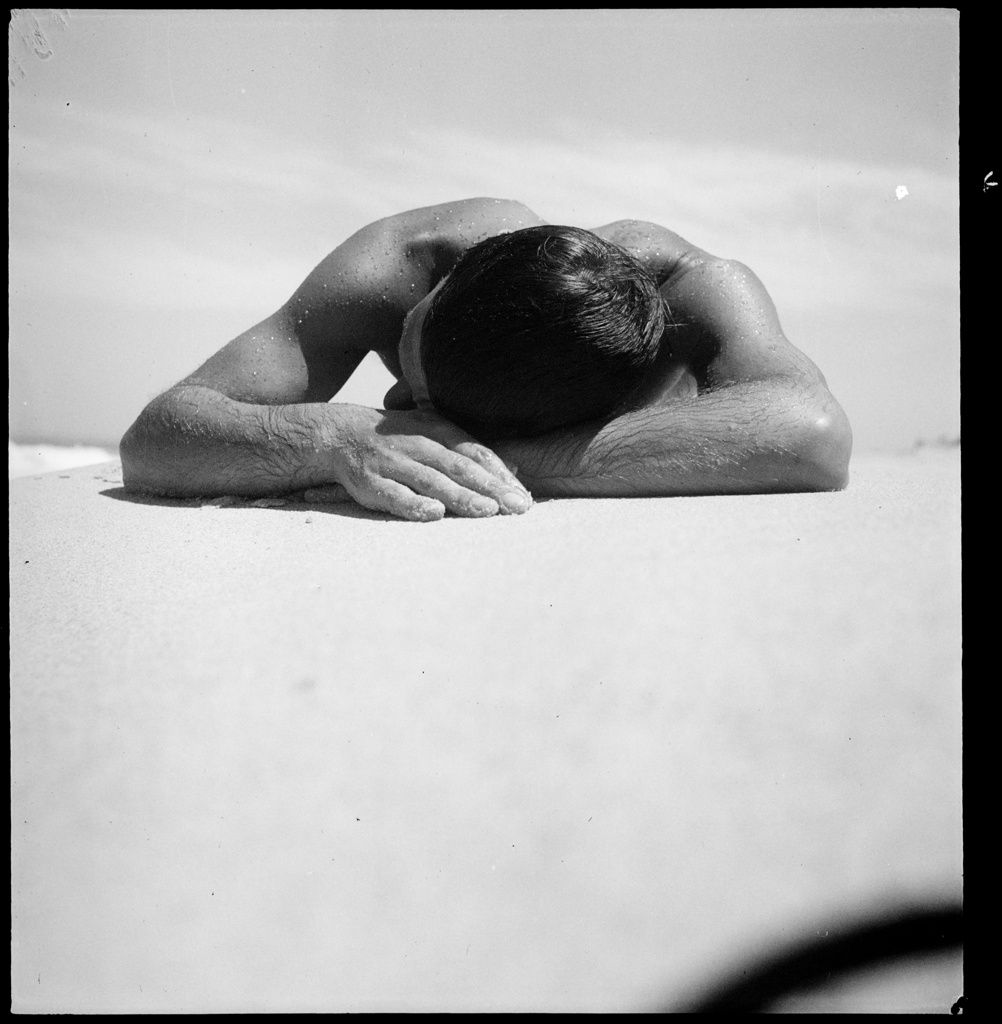
'Sunbaker' Harold Salvage, Culburra Beach, New South Wales, 1937, by Max Dupain, digital positive copied directly from original negative.

The photograph depicts the head and shoulders of a man lying flat on his stomach on the sand. His head, tilted to the left, is resting on one arm and his other arm is lying flat on the sand before him. The photograph is taken from a very low angle and head on, so nothing else of the subject can be seen. The sun appears to be almost directly overhead and casts much of the subject into deep shadow while reflecting off the beads of water on his arms and back. The subject takes up much of the upper half of the work, with the bottom half consisting of a bright, empty area of sand. The picture can be seen as "forming a single pyramidal form positioned against the horizon."

Dupain took the photograph in 1937 at Culburra Beach, a small town on the New South Wales South Coast. The man in the photograph is Harold Salvage (1905–1991), a British builder, who was part of a group of friends on a surfing trip. The first version of the Sunbaker image (with Harold's hands clasped) appeared only once, in a limited edition booklet entitled Max Dupain: photographs which was published by Hal Missingham in 1948. This was Dupain's preferred version, but the original negative was lost. The prints that became his most famous work were from a second negative with the sunbaker's hand relaxed.

The most familiar version of the photograph was not printed until a retrospective of Dupain's work in 1975 at the Australian Centre for Photography, Sydney. The only known vintage print of the original version was donated to the State Library of New South Wales as one of over 108 vintage prints compiled by Dupain's friend, architect Chris Vandyke, in the Vandyke Album.

== Reception and legacy ==
Sunbaker is more than just a young man on the beach sunbathing. It is iconic, it is a symbol of the body in contact with primal forces. These are elemental, regenerating forces, and the body on the beach gains sustenance from the earth, the sun and water.

— Isobel Crombie

The photograph has been described as "perhaps the most famous and admired photograph in Australia" and "probably the most widely recognised Australian photograph". The image has been regarded as inspired by European modernist photographers, with "more interest in abstract form than descriptive photographs." The image has "become part of the consciousness of Australians – symbolising health, vitality, a love of the outdoors and an appreciation of sport and relaxation."

Isobel Crombie, senior curator of photography at the National Gallery of Victoria, has argued that this work, and much of Dupain's work in the 1930s, shows sign of being influenced by the concepts of eugenics, vitalism, and the "body culture" movement. Crombie states that "most of us think of Dupain as a strict, clear modernist ... But there is a whole series of works ... heavily influenced by the ideas of the regeneration of a race through the revitalisation of the body." Crombie considers Dupain's work of the period, including Sunbaker, to represent a "racial archetype" of ideal Australians.

A copy of Sunbaker from the Dupain family's own collection sold for A$105,000 in June 2016.

The Australian children's television programme Bluey references Sunbaker in the 2018 episode "The Beach", in which the title character's mother Chilli Heeler relaxes in a similar pose. This scene was recreated for the cover of the February 2023 issue of the Australian edition of InStyle magazine, which featured an article on the character.
