= Worrigee =

- Suburb
- Coordinates: 34°54′52″S 150°38′19″E
- Country: Australia
- State: New South Wales
- Region: South Coast
- LGA: City of Shoalhaven
- Location: 175 km (109 mi) S of Sydney; 6 km (3.7 mi) SE of Nowra; 62 km (39 mi) N of Ulladulla

Government
  - State electorate: South Coast
  - Federal division: Gilmore
- Elevation: 22 m (72 ft)

Population
  - Total: 5,384 (SAL 2021)
- Postcode: 2540
- County: St Vincent
- Parish: Numbaa
Suburbs around Worrigee
Nowra	Terara	Brundee
Nowra	Worrigee	Brundee
South Nowra	Comberton	Mayfield

Worrigee is a suburb of Nowra in the City of Shoalhaven in New South Wales, Australia. It lies southeast of Nowra. At the 2021 census, it had a population of 5,384.

The Suburb has a Shopping Centre which has a Supermarket, Bakery, Gym, Liquor Store and other shops. It is bordered to the west by Worrigee Nature Reserve and to the east Brundee Swamp Nature Reserve.
