= Numbaa =

Small farming town in the Shoalhaven, New South Wales

- Suburb
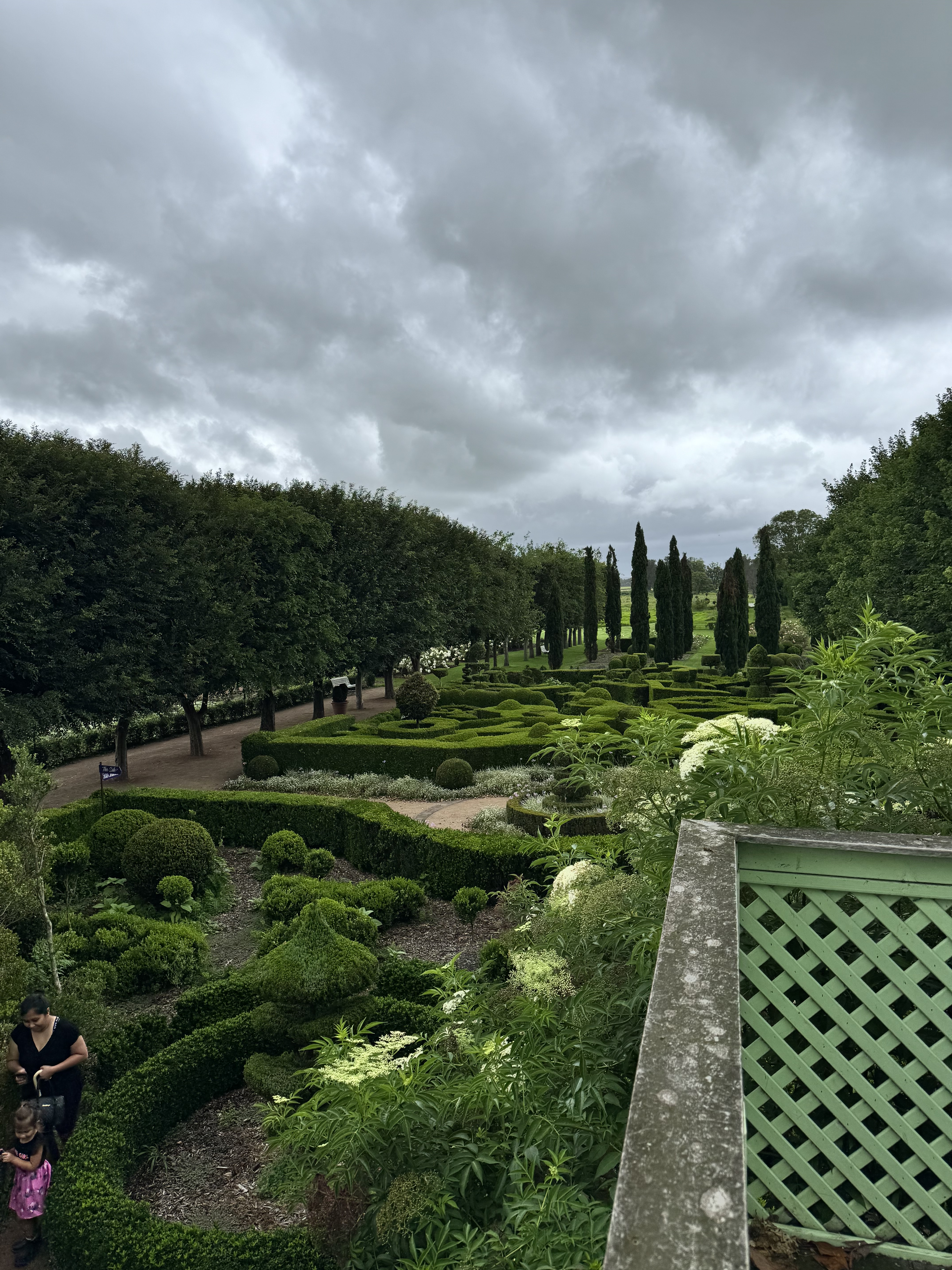
- View of the Merribee Gardens in Numbaa

- Coordinates: 34°52′04″S 150°40′46″E
- Country: Australia
- State: New South Wales
- Region: South Coast
- LGA: Shoalhaven
- Location: 7.53 km (4.68 mi) E of Nowra; 121.25 km (75.34 mi) S of Sydney
- Established: 1868 (Note: First referred to as Numbaa in 1822, church built 1855, incorporated 1868)

Government
  - State electorate: South Coast
  - Federal division: Gilmore

Area
  - Total: 19.9 km^{2} (7.7 sq mi)
- Elevation: 2 m (6.6 ft)

Population
  - Total: 122 (2021 census)
  - Density: 6.13/km^{2} (15.88/sq mi)
- Postcode: 2540
- County: St Vincent
- Parish: Numbaa
Suburbs around Numbaa
Bolong	Back Forest	Coolangatta
Terara	Numbaa	Comerong Island
Brundee	Pyree	Pyree

Numbaa (sometimes spelled Numba) is a farming locality, 7.5 Kilometres (5 Miles) east from the city of Nowra, in the Shoalhaven district of New South Wales, Australia. As of the 2021 Census it has a population of 122. The town is primarily based around the cattle industry and is built on the Shoalhaven River floodplain.

The village is largely located along Comerong Island Road, which leads to the Comerong Island ferry, which is the only way to access the island by car, and runs daily.

It is the location of The Merribee Gardens.

== Geography ==
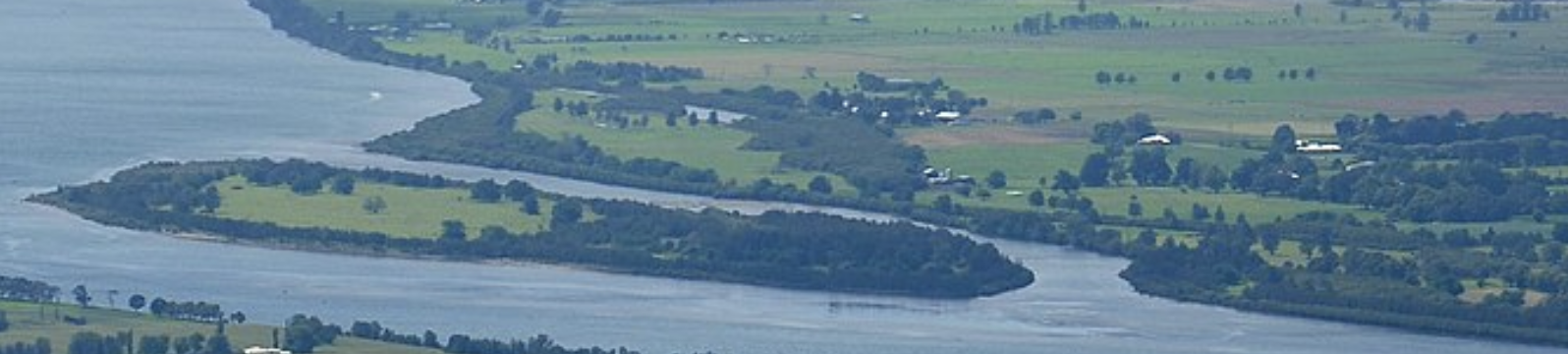
Numbaa viewed from Mount Cambewarra, with Numbaa island in the foreground

It borders the Shoalhaven River to the north, where the Numbaa and Regatta Islands are located, and Berrys Canal, the first transport canal in Australia, to the east.

The two main roads in the locality are Comerong Island Road and Jindyandy Lane. Jindyandy lane is named after the Jindyandy Mill in Pyree.

== History ==
=== Before Colonisation ===
The district lies within the country of the Aboriginal Jerrinja peoples of the Yuin nation the original inhabitants of the land. In the 2021 census, 5.7% of people were Aboriginal. The name Numbaa means "broad-leafed tea-tree".

=== European settlement ===
In February 1822 the land, referred to as "Numbaa" was granted to Alexander Berry and Edward Wollstonecraft as part of a larger, 10,000 acre, grant.

A farm was constructed shortly after, becoming the first farm in the Shoalhaven. A barn was completed in 1830 where it can still be seen today. The first church in Nowra district, an iron frame Presbyterian church, was completed in Numbaa in 1855. The church does not exist any more. However 17.2% of people in Numbaa were Presbyterian as of the 2021 census, much higher than the state total of 1.9%. Burials at the church cemetery, which still exists, began sometime before 1856. It was incorporated as the Municipality of Numbaa in 1868.

At one point Numbaa had a hotel, court, race track and multiple churches. None of which remain. From 1883 to 1953 a public school existed at Numbaa.

=== Recent history ===
From 2002 to 2012 bank restoration work was carried out at Numbaa.

== Economy ==
54.9% of employed people work in Dairy Cattle farming and 9.8% work in Beef Cattle farming.

== Notable people ==
=== Morton family ===
The Morton brothers were also all uncles of Pat Morton.

- Henry Morton (1867-1932), Speaker of the New South Wales Legislative Assembly. Brother of Mark and Phillip Morton.
- Mark Morton (1865-1938), Member of New South Wales Parliament, brother of Henry and Phillip Morton. Namesake of Morton National Park
- Philip Morton (1862-1932), Member of New South Wales Parliament. Brother of Mark and Henry Morton.
