= Max Dupain =

Australian photographer (1911–1992)

Max Dupain AC OBE
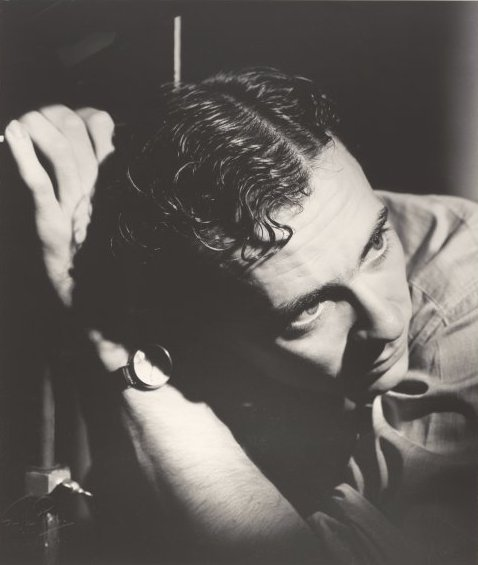
- Dupain in 1937
- Born: Maxwell Spencer Dupain; 22 April 1911; Ashfield, New South Wales, Australia
- Died: 27 July 1992 (aged 81)
- Occupation: photographer
- Notable work: Sunbaker
- Parents: George Dupain (father); Thomasine Dupain (mother)

Maxwell Spencer Dupain AC OBE (22 April 1911 – 27 July 1992) was an Australian modernist photographer.

== Early life ==
Dupain received his first camera as a gift in 1924, spurring his interest in photography. He joined the Photographic Society of NSW while still in high school, and from 1930–1933 was an apprentice in the studio of commercial and art photographer Cecil Bostock in Sydney.

== Career ==
=== Early years ===
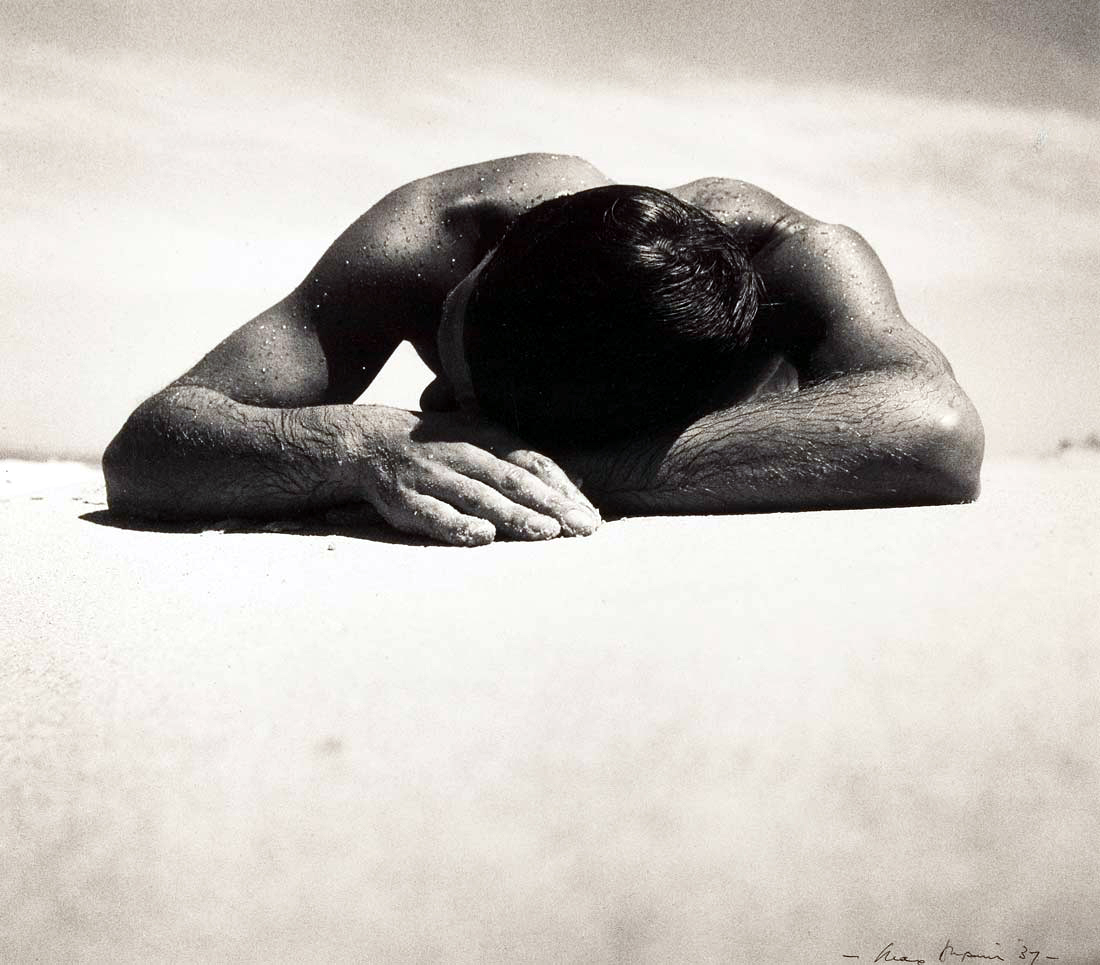
Sunbaker Max Dupain, 1975 silver gelatin print from original 1937 negative

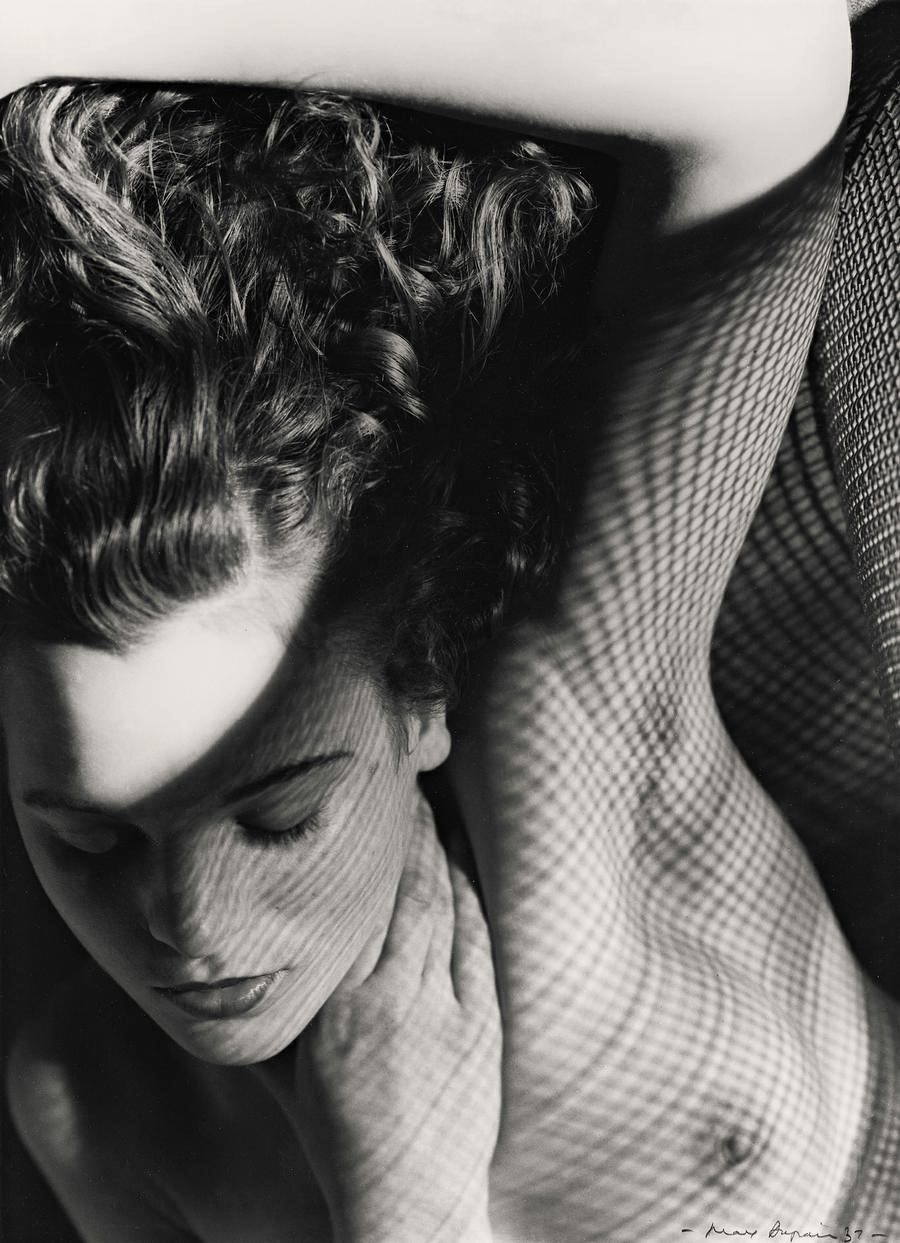
Dupain Jean with Wire Mesh (1936)

In 1934 Max Dupain opened a studio in Bond Street, Sydney. In 1937, on the south coast of New South Wales, he photographed the head and shoulders of his English friend Harold Salvage, lying on the sand at Culburra Beach. The photograph, titled "Sunbaker", began to receive wide recognition after a retrospective at the Australian Centre for Photography in Sydney in 1975. Prints were purchased in 1976 by the Art Gallery of New South Wales, the National Gallery of Victoria, and the National Gallery of Australia. By the mid 1990s Sunbaker had cemented its place as an iconic image of Australia. A vintage print of a version of the Sunbaker is in an album of photographs donated to the State Library of New South Wales by the family of Dupain's friend, architect Chris Vandyke.

=== Later years ===
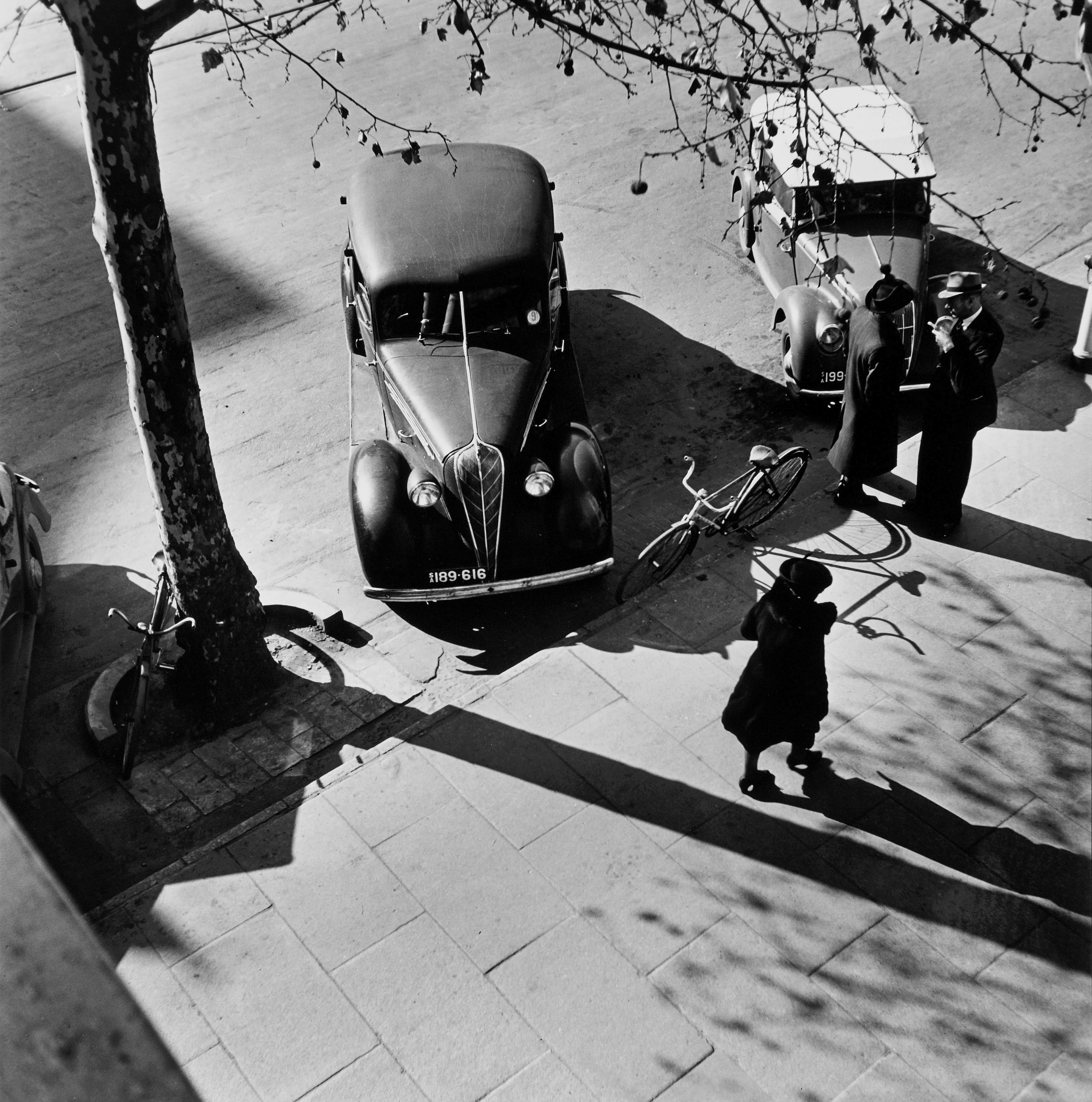
Adelaide street scene, (1946)

During World War II Dupain served with the Royal Australian Air Force in Darwin and Papua New Guinea helping create camouflage.

The war created in Dupain a greater awareness of truth in documentary. In 1947, these feelings were reinforced by the book Grierson on Documentary which defined the need for photography without pretence. The catchcry was "the creative treatment of actuality". Dupain was keen to restart his studio with this new perspective, and abandon what he called the "cosmetic lie of fashion photography or advertising illustration". Dupain said:

"Modern photography must do more than entertain, it must incite thought and by its clear statements of actuality, cultivate a sympathetic understanding of men and women and the life they live and create."

Dupain's documentary work of this period is exemplified in his photograph "Meat Queue". He used a naturalistic style, "capturing a moment of everyday interaction [rather than] attempting any social comment".

Dupain worked extensively for the University of New South Wales and CSR Limited, and made many trips to the interior and coast of northern Australia. Apart from his war service he rarely left Australia, the first time was in 1978 at age 67, to photograph the new Australian Embassy in Paris designed by his longtime friend and associate Harry Seidler. He wrote, "I find that my whole life, if it is going to be of any consequence in photography, has to be devoted to that place where I have been born, reared and worked, thought, philosophised and made pictures to the best of my ability. And that's all I need".

In the 1950s, the advent of the new consumerism meant plenty of promotional photography for advertising and he attracted clients from magazines, advertising agencies and industrial firms. He also pursued his love of architectural photography, which continued for most of his life.

The State Library of New South Wales holds the most significant archive of Max Dupain's work; in June 2016 it announced that it holds Dupain's entire photographic collection, including the Max Dupain Exhibition Archive of 28,000 negatives including the Sunbaker and Bondi, 1939, as well as lesser-known photographs such as his record of Penrith in Sydney's west in 1948. These images join existing collections of Dupain's commercial and architectural photography, studio portraits, and his record of the Ballets Russes.

Dupain's began using a Linhof Technika 4x5 camera in 1959 and it became his 'go to' camera for architectural photography until the 1980s, including his documentary photography of the Sydney Opera House and workers during its construction from 1959 to 1973. This camera is now a part of Sydney Powerhouse Museum collection.

Dupain continued working until his death in 1992.

== Personal life ==
In 1939, after the outbreak of World War II, Dupain married photographer Olive Cotton but they soon divorced. A decade later, Dupain married Diana Illingworth and they had a daughter Danina and a son Rex, who also became a photographer.

== Honours ==
Dupain was appointed an Officer of the Order of the British Empire (OBE) in the 1982 New Year Honours list.

He was made a Companion of the Order of Australia (AC) in the Australia Day Honours 1992.

== Max Dupain Archival Collections ==
- Max Dupain and Associates records and negative archive, taken before 30 July 1998, approximately 155,000 Negatives, including transparencies in 973 boxes, held by the State Library of New South Wales PXA 2155 PXE 1679
- Max Dupain Exhibition Negative Archive of film and glass plate negatives, 29024 negatives, 2150 photographic prints, and some textual material, ca 1920–1992, held by the State Library of New South Wales 1037031
- Max Dupain archive of photographs and photo negatives (Series 2), State Library of New South Wales 414306
- Max Dupain, collection of photographs of Sydney and Manly, ca. 1938–1949, 1970 and 1988, State Library of New South Wales PXD 965/1-20
- Collection of photographs from the studio of Max Dupain and Associates, 1947–1968, State Library of New South Wales PXD 720
- Architectural photographs by Max Dupain, 1939–1988, State Library of New South Wales PXD 1013
- Camping trips on Culburra Beach, N.S.W., 1937, State Library of New South Wales PXA 1951
- Papers of Max Dupain, 1937, Art Gallery of New South Wales Library, access-date=10 November 2021

== Bibliography ==
For a full list, see :

- Max Dupain’s Australian Landscapes, Mead and Beckett, Australia, 1988.
- Fine Houses of Sydney, Irving Robert; Kinstler John; Dupain Max, Methuen, Sydney, 1982.
- Max Dupain Photographs published by Ure Smith, Sydney, 1948.
- Isobel Crombie , Body Culture: Max Dupain , Photography and Australian Culture,1919–1939, Peleus Press, Melbourne 2004
- Helen Ennis , Max Dupain A Portrait, HarperCollins Publishers, Australia, 2024
