= Lake Wollumboola =

Lake in the state of New South Wales, Australia

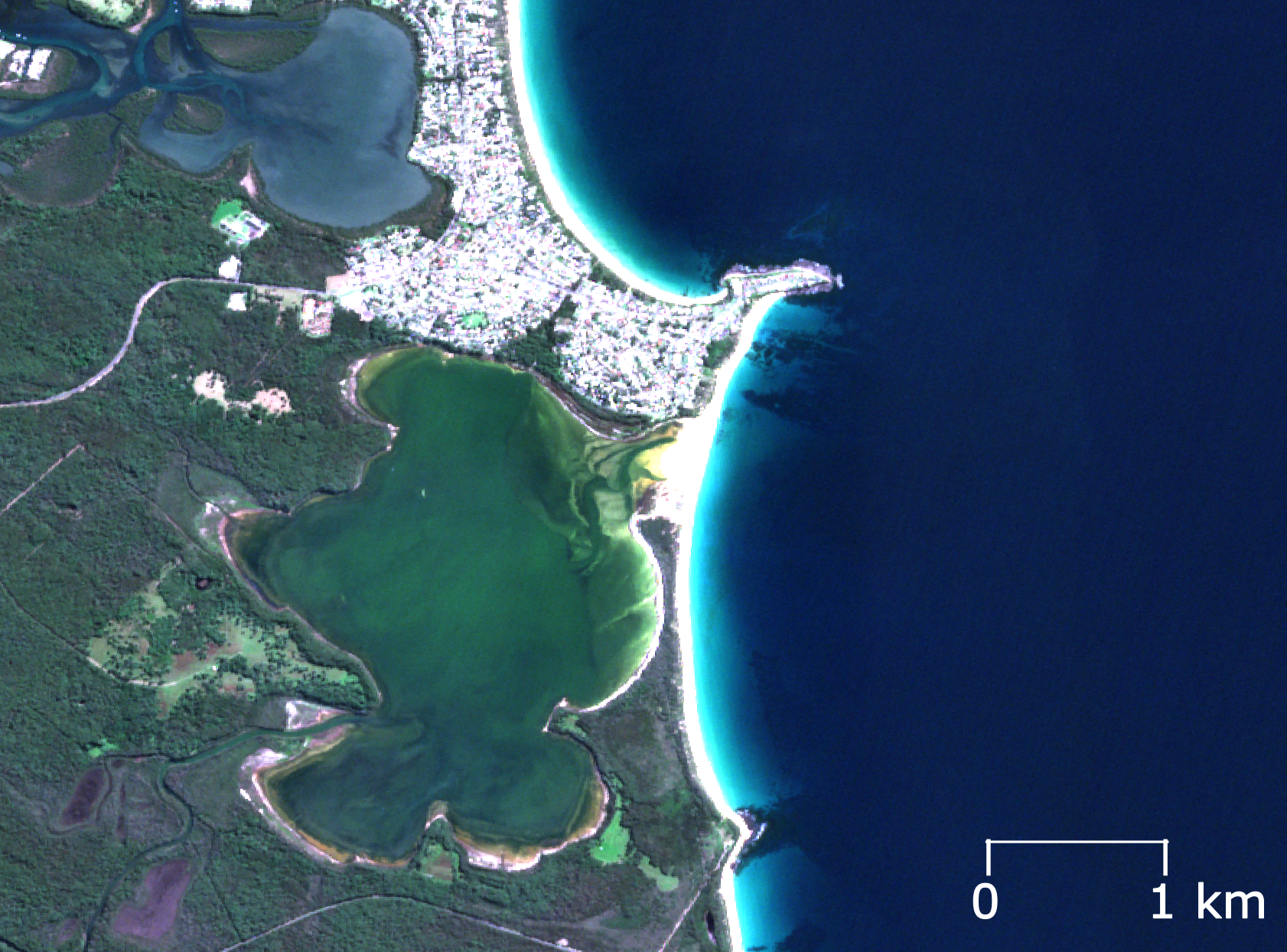

- Location within Australia
- Location: New South Wales, Australia
- Coordinates: 34°57′06″S 150°45′43″E
- Type: lake
- Surface area: 648 hectares (1,600 acres)

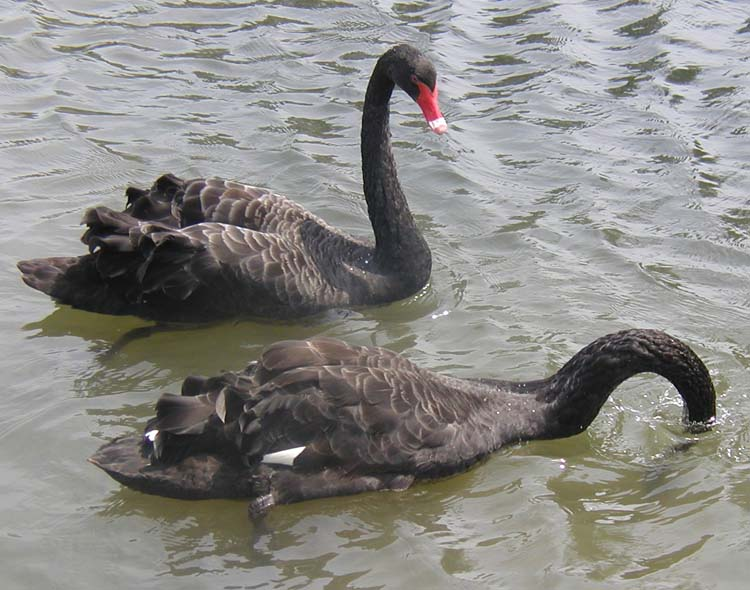
The lake is an important site for black swans

Lake Wollumboola is a 648 hectares (1,600 acres) coastal lake in the Shoalhaven region of New South Wales, Australia. It lies to the immediate south of the town of Culburra Beach and to the north of Jervis Bay. It forms part of Jervis Bay National Park. The lake is separated from the ocean by a berm about 100 metres (330 ft) wide which breaches only when the lake fills to over 2.5 metres (8 ft 2 in) above mean sea level.

== Birds ==
The lake has been identified by BirdLife International as an Important Bird Area (IBA) because it often supports over 1% of the world population of black swans, especially in drought years, as well as of chestnut teals.
