= Culburra Beach =

- Town
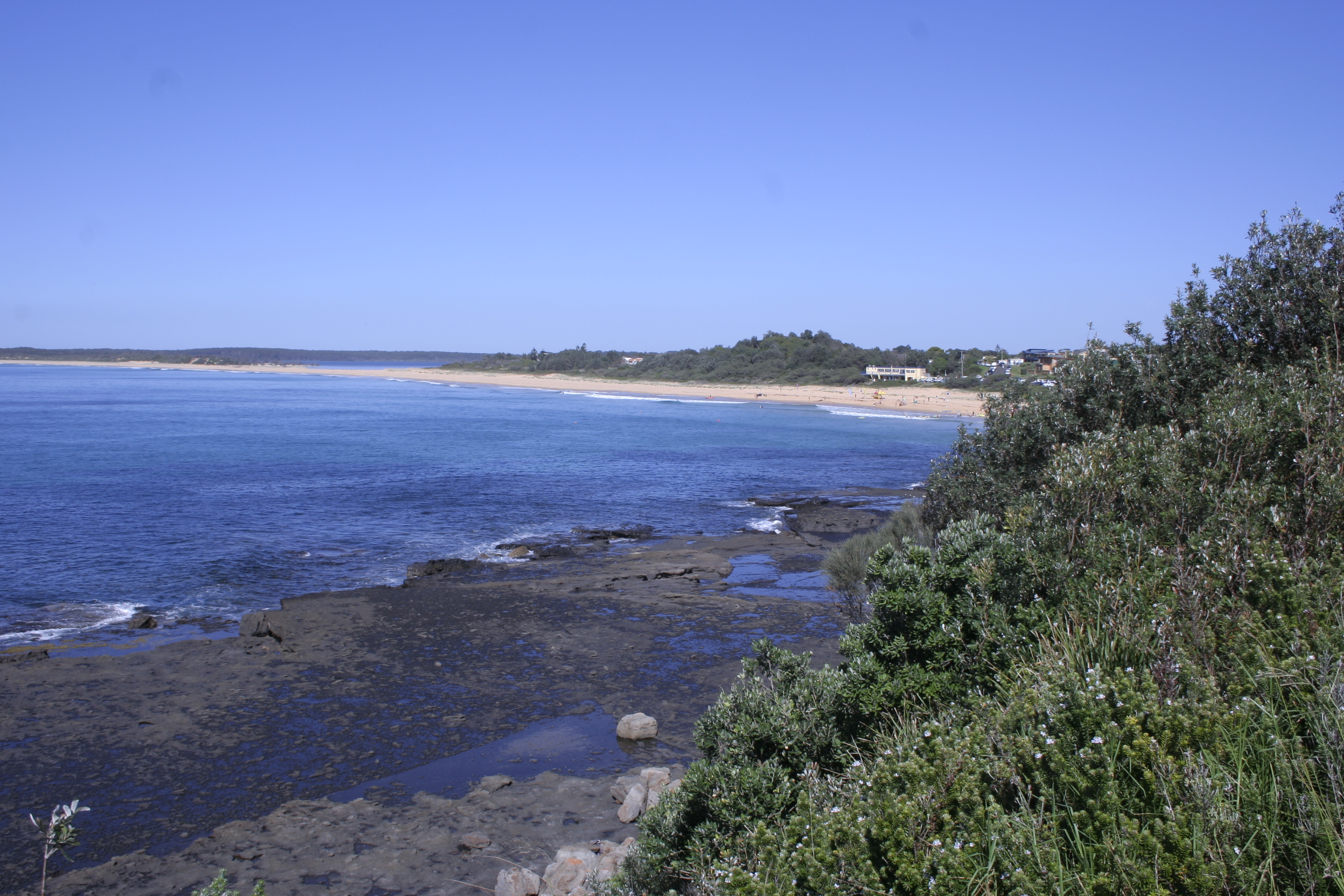
- Northern end of Warrain Beach, the main surfing beach

- Coordinates: 34°56′S 150°46′E
- Country: Australia
- State: New South Wales
- Region: South Coast
- LGA: City of Shoalhaven
- Location: 18 km (11 mi) ESE of Nowra; 171 km (106 mi) S of Sydney
- Established: 1887

Government
  - State electorate: South Coast
  - Federal division: Gilmore
- Elevation: 12 m (39 ft)

Population
  - Total: 2,946 (2021 census)
- Postcode: 2540
- County: St Vincent
- Parish: Numbaa
Localities around Culburra Beach
Orient Point	Comerong Island	Tasman Sea
Pyree	Culburra Beach	Tasman Sea
Wollumboola	Lake Wollumboola	Tasman Sea

Culburra Beach, commonly referred to as Culburra, is a town in the South Coast region of New South Wales, Australia. Located within the Shoalhaven local government area, the town is 18 kilometres (11 mi) east-southeast of Nowra on Jerrinja Wandi Wandian Aboriginal Country. At the 2021 census, the town had a population of 2,946 and is the regional centre for the coastal villages of Currarong, Callala Beach, Callala Bay and Orient Point.

== Description ==
Culburra Beach is a small seaside town and a popular holiday, fishing and surfing location. Local industries include oysters, fishing, and prawning. It has two surf beaches, Culburra Beach and Warrain Beach. The town is flanked by the Crookhaven River to the north, Curleys Bay to the west, and Lake Wollumboola to the south. It is home to the Culburra Beach Boardriders, Culburra Dolphins Rugby League team and the Culburra Cougars soccer team and the Culburra Beach Festival know to many as the Burradise Festival which happens annually in September celebrating local creative arts, Jerrinja Aboriginal culture, original live music, the annual Surf Bash tournament, skateboarding, regional foods, markets, crafts and makers.

The town also boasts the two closest surf beaches to Nowra and is home to the Culburra Beach and Nowra Surf Lifesaving Club whose clubhouse is located at the northern end of Warrain Beach. The beaches are patrolled during the summer holiday period, and being located on either side of Penguin Head face in different directions, providing a variety of surf conditions for board riders, swimmers, body surfers and families with young children. A wide variety of fish species are caught on these beaches and from the rocky headlands adjacent to them.

It is the location of Crookhaven Heads Light.

== Notable people ==
- Owen Wright – Surfer
- Tyler Wright – Surfer

== History ==
Originally called Wheelers Point after the first landholder George Wheeler; the name was changed to Culburra in 1916 after an Aboriginal word meaning "sand"; and later to Culburra Beach. The town was established on lands originally allotted to George Wheeler, Patrick McCaffray, and Edward Maurice O'Connell.

Postal services were first provided from Warrain Beach Post Office, which was renamed Culburra Beach in 1970.

The area's first school was the Roseby Park Aboriginal School, which opened in 1903. It became a public school in 1906 and remained that way until it closed in 1964. Culburra children had to attend Pyree Public School until its closure in August 1976, and the following month saw the opening of Culburra Public School.

The modern street plan of Culburra Beach has been popularly attributed to Walter Burley Griffin, who also designed the street plan for Canberra, but was in fact the work of developer Henry Halloran, as landowner, designer, and surveyor.

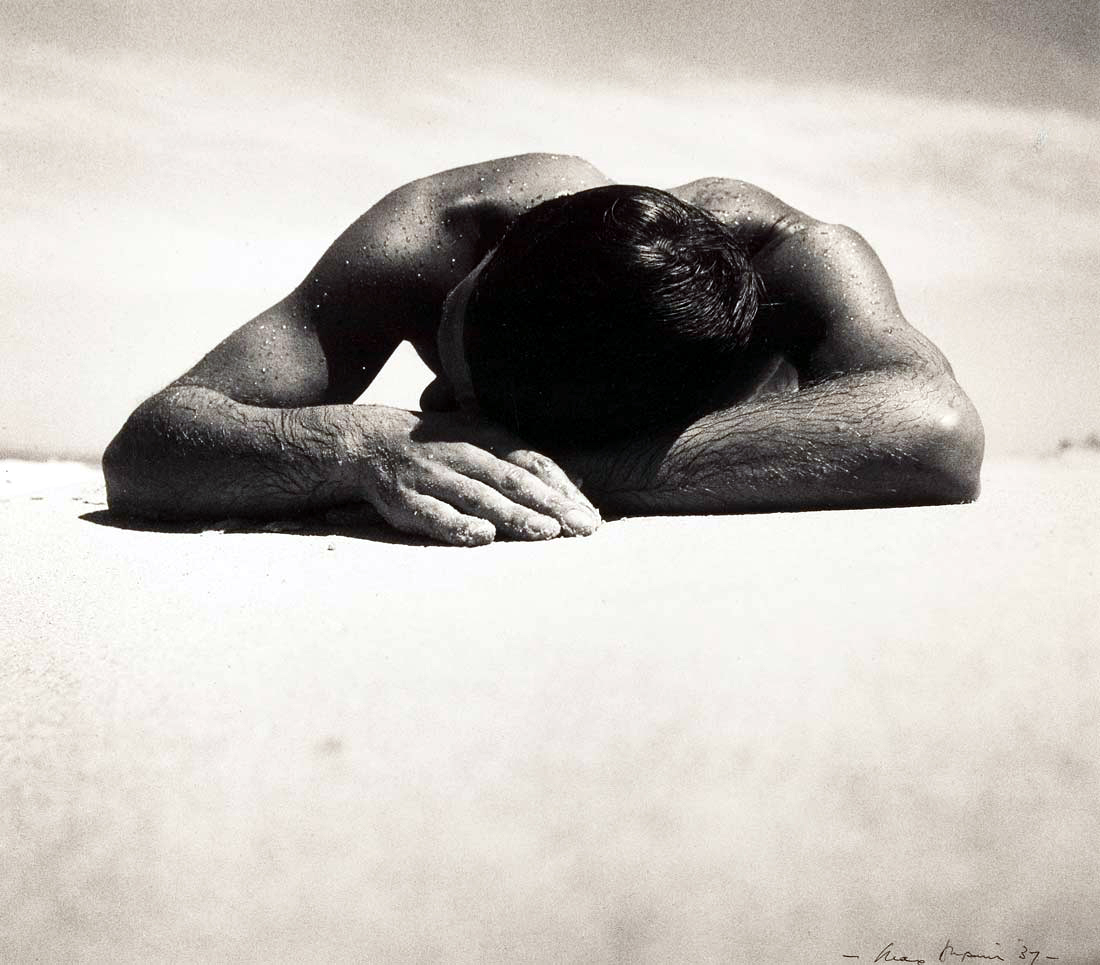
Max Dupain's "Sunbaker" photo. Taken in Culburra Beach

Culburra Beach is the location of the famous Max Dupain photo Sunbaker. Dupain took the photograph in 1937. The man in the photograph was Harold Salvage (1905–1991), a British builder, who was part of a group of friends on a surfing trip. The most familiar version of the photograph was not printed until a retrospective of Dupain's work in 1975.

In the 2010s and 2020s, the area of West Culburra was being investigated for development of additional housing.

== Population ==
According to the 2021 census of Population, there were 2,946 people in Culburra Beach.

- Aboriginal and Torres Strait Islander people made up 6.4% of the population.
- 84.7% of people were born in Australia. The next most common country of birth was England at 3.3%.
- 93.1% of people spoke only English at home.
- The most common responses for religion were No Religion 40.8%, Anglican 20.9% and Catholic 20.8%.
