= Jerrinja =

Aboriginal Australians of New South Wales

Jerrinja are an Aboriginal Australian people from the South Coast of New South Wales, Australia. Their traditional lands include Cullunghutti (Coolangatta Mountain), Shoalhaven Heads, Greenwell Point, Orient Point, Culburra Beach, Lake Wollumboola, Currarong, Bundarwa (northern Jervis Bay). They are members of the Wandi Wandi (Wandiwandian) tribe. Their name is also the name of their preeminent community: the Jerrinja Aboriginal Community at Orient Point; that was known as Roseby Park Aboriginal Reserve Mission Station and was controlled and administered by the New South Wales Aboriginal Protection Board until the late 1960s.

== History ==
Contemporary Jerrinja descend from those peoples who gathered or were gathered into the Roseby Park Aboriginal Reserve around the early 1900s.

In 1983, following on from the provisions of the recent NSW Aboriginal Land Rights Act 1983, ownership of the Roseby Park was transferred to the Jerrinja Local Aboriginal Land Council.

Many Jerrinja people have been strongly involved in the Aboriginal Land Rights struggles for more than fifty years. The former NSW Aboriginal "mission" Roseby Park at Orient Point was renamed Jerrinja Aboriginal Community and is located within the central-east of their country. Jerrinja are a coastal "salt-water" peoples who have maintained a strong connection with their country.

Some of the culturally significant places within their country include Mount Coolangatta (Cullunghutti), Lake Wollumboola and Beecroft Peninsula.

== Sources ==
- "The Jerrinja tribe and the Shoalhaven". New Bush Telegraph. 17 February 2020.
- Kwok, Natalie (2011). "Owning Your People: Sustainjing relatedness and identity in a south coast aboriginal community". In Musharbash, Yasmine; Barber, Marcus (eds.). Ethnography & the Production of Anthropological Knowledge: Essays in Honour of Nicolas Peterson. Australian National University Press. pp. 159–173. ISBN 978-1-921-66697-1.
