= Comerong Island =

Island and locality in the Shoalhaven region of New South Wales

- Interactive map of Comerong Island

Geography
- Location: Tasman Sea
- Coordinates: 34°53′00″S 150°45′00″E
- Area: 13.9 km^{2} (5.4 sq mi)

Administration
- Australia
- State: New South Wales
- Local Government Area: Shoalhaven

Demographics
- Population: 19 (2021)

Comerong Island is a small island and locality in the Shoalhaven region of New South Wales, Australia. It is situated at the mouth of the Shoalhaven River, bordered by Berry’s Canal to the west, the Crookhaven River to the south, and the Tasman Sea to the east. As of the 2021 Census, it has a population of 19. Public access to the island is via a cable ferry from Numbaa, operated by Shoalhaven City Council.

Approximately half of the island is designated as the Comerong Island Nature Reserve.

== Geography ==
Comerong Island is geographically divided into a rural western section and an uninhabited nature reserve to the east. Comerong Island Road, the main thoroughfare, extends from the ferry crossing at Berry’s Canal. The island's boundaries are defined by Berry's Canal to the west, the Crookhaven River to the south, and the Tasman Sea to the east.

The southern part of the island consists largely of tidal mangrove swamps, including the shallow Comerong Bay. Adjacent to the island are the smaller mangrove islets of Mangrove Island and Apple Tree Orchard Island, separated from the main island by Curries Creek.

A narrow sandspit at the northern tip connects the island to Seven Mile Beach. This spit periodically breaches during significant floods. The island serves as habitat for numerous shorebirds.

== History ==
Comerong Island is the traditional land of the Jerrinja people. The origin and meaning of the Aboriginal word "Comerong" are unknown.

The island was artificially separated from the mainland in June 1822. This occurred when convicts, under the direction of Alexander Berry and explorer Hamilton Hume, hand-dug Berry's Canal. This canal was Australia's first navigable canal, created to provide safer shipping access to the Shoalhaven River estuary.

The names of the adjacent islets, Apple Tree Orchard and Mangrove, and Curries Creek, are of unknown origin, though "Apple Orchard Island" was documented as early as 1853.
