= Henry Williamson Lugard =

Military engineer and architect (d.1857)

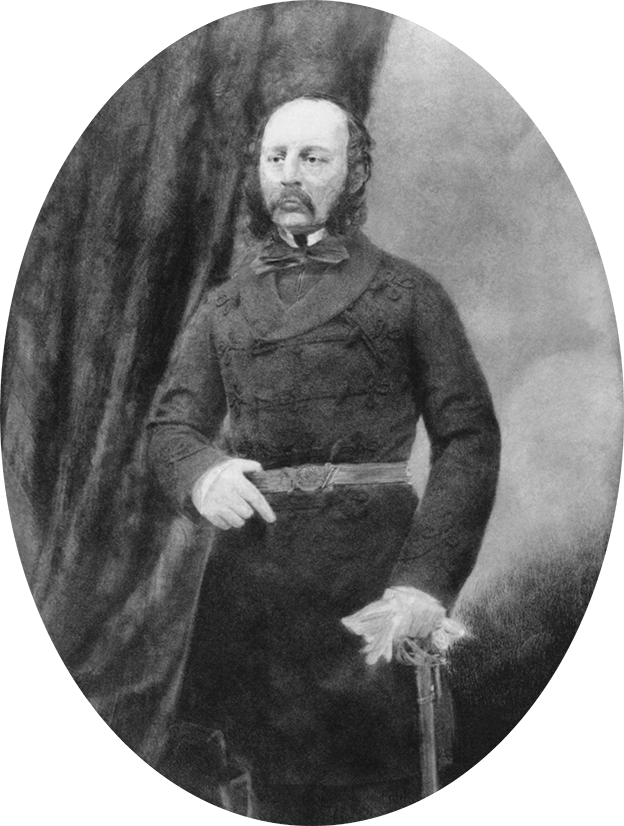
- Henry Lugard; Mitchell Library, State Library of NSW
- Born: 10 July 1813; Chelsea, Middlesex, England
- Died: 30 November 1857 (aged 44); Victoria, Hong Kong
- Burial place: Plot 20/17/1, 香港墳場 Hong Kong Cemetery, Happy Valley, Hong Kong
- Relatives: Edward Lugard (brother); Frederick Lugard (nephew)
- Military career
- Allegiance: United Kingdom
- Branch: Board of Ordnance; British Army
- Service years: 1832–1857
- Rank: Lieutenant Colonel
- Service number: 628
- Unit: Corps of Royal Engineers
- Commands: CRE, Limerick District, 1846; CRE, Dublin District, 1847; CRE, Hong Kong, 1857
- Campaigns: China Expedition, 1857

Lieutenant Colonel Henry Williamson Lugard (10 July 1813 – 30 November 1857) was a military engineer of the Corps of Royal Engineers. He served as architect and engineer in the construction of military, convict and public works in the Colony of New South Wales and Norfolk Island (1835–1840 & 1842–1844), military works in New Zealand (1840–1842) and Ireland (1844–1857), and as Commanding Royal Engineer for the China Expedition of 1857, based in Hong Kong.

== Early life ==
Henry Williamson Lugard, born 10 July 1813, Chelsea, London, was the sixth of seven children of John Lugard (1761–1843), and Jane Llewellyn Trewman (c. 1781–1861), daughter of Robert Trewman, printer and proprietor of Trewman's Exeter Flying Post. His father, John, had taken part in the Netherlands Campaign of 1793–1795, where, as a prisoner of war, he spent two years on parole in the park of the Duke of Orleans' chateau at Vilvorde. He served as an officer in the 6th (Inniskilling) Dragoons from 1795 to c. 1804 with the role of adjutant from 1 June 1797 to 1702. Married to Jane since December 1803, in September 1804 John accepted the position of Secretary and Adjutant of the Royal Military Asylum, Chelsea; a new institution for the care and education of orphans of British military personnel. It was a position he'd hold for some 39 years with the rank of captain.

Henry Lugard trained at the Royal Military Academy, Woolwich from 1827 to 1831. Amongst the instructors and masters at that time were: Michael Faraday, Chemical Lecturer; Captain John Simcoe Macaulay, RE, Professor of Fortification; Dr Olinthus Gregory, Professor of Mathematics; Peter Barlow, Mathematical Master; and Thales Fielding, Drawing Master for Landscape.

== Career ==
=== England ===
Lugard was commissioned as no. 628, 2nd Lieutenant, in the Corps of Royal Engineers, Board of Ordnance, on 29 May 1832, age 18, and spent several years with the Royal Artillery at Chatham, Kent.

The need for military engineers for military and convict works in the Australian colonies had long been felt in Britain. Finally, in 1835, an Ordnance establishment was ordered to be formed at Sydney, New South Wales, with depots at Bathurst and Hobart, Van Diemen's Land. A number of Royal Engineers with a detachment of the Corps of Royal Sappers and Miners were assigned to New South Wales—Captain George Barney, Commanding Royal Engineer, Lieutenant Henry Lugard and Mr George Graham, Clerk of Works—and Van Diemen's Land—Captain Roger Kelsall, Commanding Royal Engineer, and Mr Robert Howe, Clerk of Works. Furthermore, Sir George Gipps, who'd served in the Royal Engineers during the Peninsular War and elsewhere in Europe, was appointed Governor of New South Wales in 1837.

=== New South Wales and Norfolk Island ===
Lugard, with older brother Edward on furlough returning to India, departed Portsmouth for Sydney on the convict ship Hive on 3 August 1835. Whilst sailing in sight of land up the coast of New South Wales on a dark and cloudy night of 10 December, Hive ran ashore on Bherwerre Beach near Cape St George. Edward and the surgeon, John Donohoe, RN, assisted in the evacuation of the ship to shore. Lugard took a lead in establishing the survivors' camp amongst dense scrub, constructing bowers for shelter, latrines and campfires, and having prisoners bring up the provisions. Rescued by the steam packet Tamar and HMS Zebra, they at last arrived at Sydney on 16 December.

Following promotion to rank of lieutenant, as of 6 December 1835, efforts in establishing the Ordnance Department, and Edward's departure for Calcutta by the East Indiaman Bencoolen in June 1836, Lugard was sent on to Newcastle, in about September–October 1836, as architect and superintendent for the construction of the new military barracks devised upon the system adopted in England, the breakwater and other public works. Whilst there in 1837, he also worked on the design and construction of the Mounted Police Barracks at Dungog.

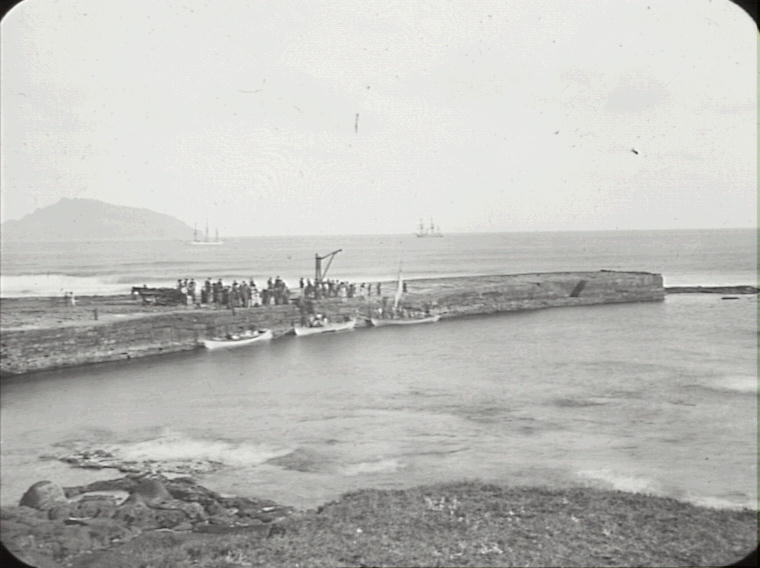
The landing place or Lugard's pier, Kingston, Norfolk Island
Photo: Frank Walter, 1917
Royal Australian Historical Society

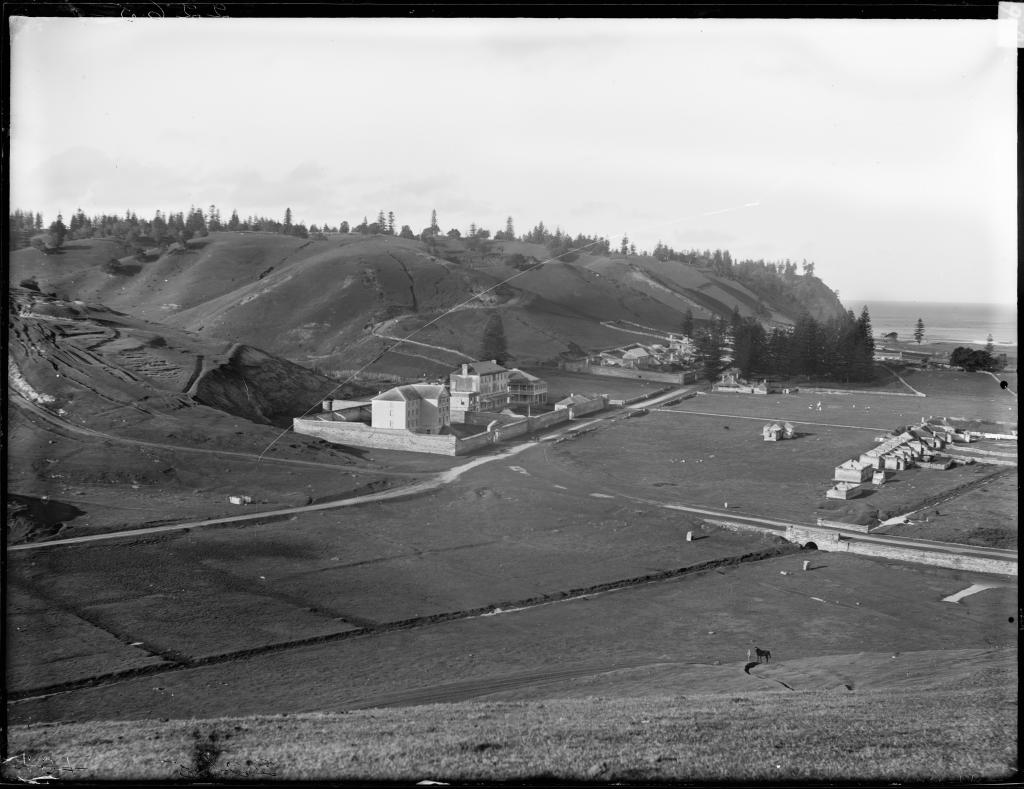
Kingston, Norfolk Island.
Photo: Kerry and Co, Sydney, c. 1890
Powerhouse Museum

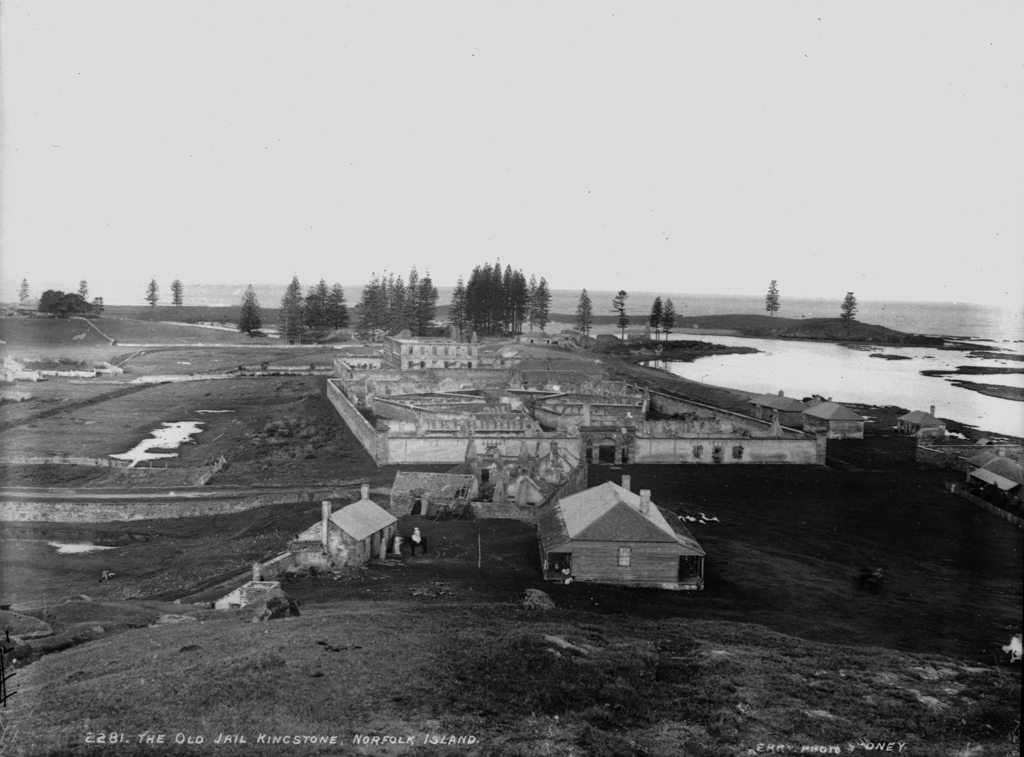
The ruins of New Gaol, 1847, built on Lugard's plans, 1839.
Photo: Kerry and Co, Sydney, c. 1890
Powerhouse Museum

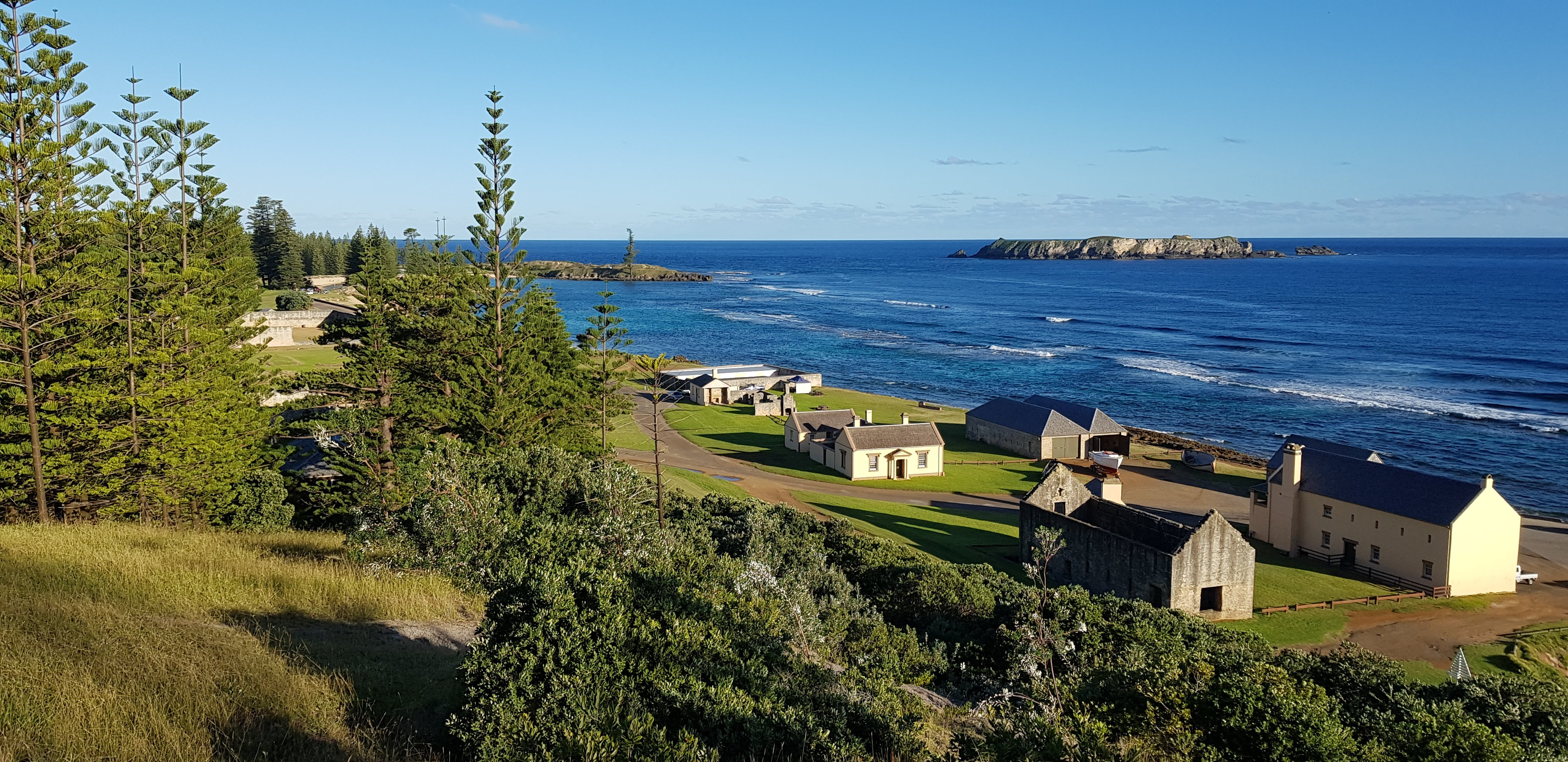
The crank mill ruin and beach store building (foreground) from Flagstaff Hill, Kingston, Norfolk Island, 2018.

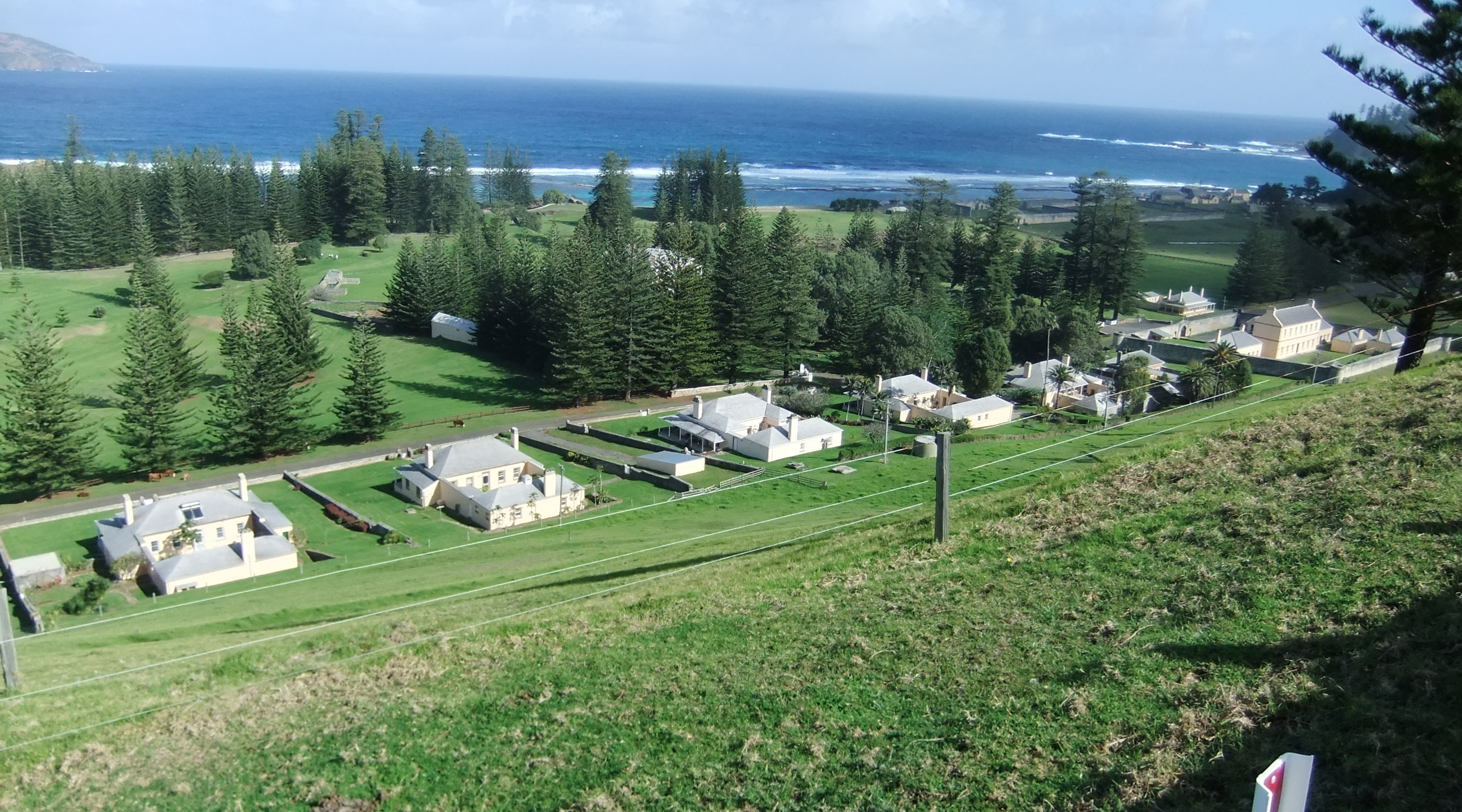
Civil officers' quarters and old military barracks, Quality Row, Kingston, Norfolk Island, 2018

Then, in August 1838, as concern had grown over the cost and quality of works at Norfolk Island penal settlement, Lieutenant Lugard set forth there to assist the commandant, Major Joseph Anderson, with the plans for a new prison and other convict works. At Kingston Lugard cleared Lee Reef and built a landing pier at the harbour entrance, later noted by Lieutenant George Bordes, RE, as "Lieut. Lugard's Pier", designed the radial pentagonal New Gaol with central watchtower and perimeter wall, proposed civil officers' quarters and other building improvements to Quality Row, as well as survey the settlement and produce drawings of existing buildings. Works were also planned for the agricultural area at Longridge and improvements to Cascade Bay wharf.

Major Thomas Bunbury, 80th Regiment, succeeding Anderson as commandant in 1839, found Lugard to be good company enough to invite him to take up residence at Government House, now too vacant and commodious for one person.

That year, whilst prisoners waited on officers for their Slaughter Bay fishing excursion, four prisoners took a boat and escaped for the open sea. Leading the chase with two boats of soldiers, Lugard caught up to them about two miles out. The escapees surrendered after being fired on, returned to the island towing Lugard's boat and were tried and convicted by Commandant Bunbury within half an hour of arrival.

In 1839 orders had been received to put Port Jackson into a state of defence. Recalled to Sydney, he arrived back via the Government brig Governor Phillip on 21 November to install some cannon which had arrived from England for that purpose. In late February 1840 he completed drawings for proposed solitary cells at the Parramatta Female Factory and other prison buildings sympathetic to Captain Alexander Maconochie's prison reforms.

His determination in an emergency was again called on when, suitably well dressed, he attended St Patrick's Ball at the new Court House on the night of 17–18 March 1840, with Colonel George Barney and other officers. At Blanch's stables, a carter recovering from overindulgence at celebrations lit up a pipe and, accidentally, the straw about him. The flames ignited the building and spread. When discovered after 2:00 am, soldiers, engines and prisoners rushed to extinguish the flames but by 3:00 am the adjacent Royal Hotel was well alight and the fire beyond control.

Barney and Lugard left the ball and in taking charge, put their efforts into containing the spread of fire. Lugard and Graham fell from a roof, fortunately escaping injury. In amongst the valiant efforts of all, including Barney, officers, soldiers and prisoners, Lugard's judgement in leveling several dwellings behind Belmore's residence probably saved Victoria Theatre and Nash's premises. Had the wind changed, Barney was prepared to blow up several George Street houses. As danger passed, the depth of Barney and Lugard's involvement could be seen in the soiled state of their clothes. In gratitude the Australian General Assurance Company presented Lugard with a silver cup.

=== New Zealand ===
Lieutenant Governor Captain William Hobson, RN, had settled a treaty with New Zealand Rangatira in early February 1840, and upon advice had purchased Okiato, Bay of Islands, for the colony's new capital, Russell, in March–April. He suffered a stroke on 1 March, and in the following deficiency of news in Sydney regarding his situation, the Governor, Sir George Gipps, sent Bunbury to take charge should Hobson be dead or incapable. HMS Buffalo conveyed the 80th Regiment, Hobson's family, and others. They arrived at the Bay of Islands on 16 April to find Hobson recovering well enough.

Lugard was instructed to proceed to New Zealand to make a military survey of the islands on 1 August, along with Clerk of Works George Graham, recently returned from the Treaty signing, to erect and take charge of the military and convict buildings. Departing Sydney on the Victoria, 8–9 August 1840, Lugard, Graham and family, Captain William Foster, 80th Regiment, and 23 of his soldiers as military artificers, arrived at Kororāreka on 18 August.

Regardless of the unsuitability of Russell as the capital, the soldiers needed shelter and facilities. Lots 1, 2 and waterfront, Block 2, Hobson Street, were designated as military grounds. With no definite guidance from Captain Barney and left to improvise under an extreme paucity of means, Lugard, Graham and artificers constructed a temporary rustic loop-holed non-bulletproof barracks with cookhouse from saplings, two roomed officers' quarter, officers' kitchen and privies, as well as partially erect a wooden house brought over from Sydney, all within four months. As soon as that was done, Hobson decided to move the capital to Waitematā Harbour—Auckland. As Russell would be deserted, along with Bunbury's dread of his men living in dilapidated tents for another winter, the idea of building permanent barracks for the troops in Auckland rose to priority. With some persuasion, Hobson agreed to the idea.

Bunbury's force arrived at Waitematā Harbour on 18 December 1840. Within the few hours for decisions, a site was chosen for a fort on an elevated tongue of land, the disused Maori headland pā of Te Rerenga Ora Iti with its ready-made broad deep ditch and parapet—Point Britomart. Though the area for buildings was not large, the point faced the harbour entrance and was deemed necessary. Lugard prepared plans for Auckland Barracks (Fort Britomart) with quarters for 1 field officer, 6 officers and 114 men, along with a hospital and mess house and kitchen, laying out the fort along a centreline angled at about 20˚ east of true north along the high ground to the point. An entrance across the ditch was formed by cutting through and throwing in part of the parapet at the centreline. The wooden house partially erected at Russell, dismantled and shipped, was rebuilt as a hospital and commissariat store at the other end of the centreline, near the point. Auckland's first hospital had no patients in its first three months.

A two-storey T-shaped stone loop-holed soldiers' barracks, measuring overall 50 x 59 feet—the front section for 56 men, the rear section for 32 men—was constructed on northern side of the square, on the centreline facing the ditch and entrance. Work on Auckland's first stone building started in February–March 1841, with the basalt stone quarried from Maungawhau / Mount Eden some 2 miles away. On the eastern town side of the centreline and barrack square, was the wooden officers' mess house with kitchen, pantry, cellar, and outdoor deck and stairs connecting them. On the southern Princes Street side of the square, two octagonal stone loop-holed guard-houses containing an internal fireplace and bench bed were to flank the entrance, but only one was built. Some officers engaged Maori to build comfortable raupō huts around fort enclosure.

After some six months work, the front section of the barracks was complete in September 1841. Lugard departed for Sydney on 15 March 1842, leaving his replacement, Lieutenant George Augustus Bennett, RE, to complete the rear section, deal with the financial issues and other works. Bunbury wrote: "I was sorry to lose Lugard, as I was always cordially supported and assisted by him." Thomas Bernard Collinson, RE, quoting Lugard's letter of 1842, later commented:

Again, at Auckland, "we had no assistance from Sydney in the shape of materials. I had to make shingles and bricks—fell and saw timber—burn shells for lime—collect scoria for building—and none but soldiers to work with, and only hand-carts and a boat. I had no authority to purchase materials or employ civilians." It is wonderful what a good, substantial barrack he left behind him with such materials to work with.

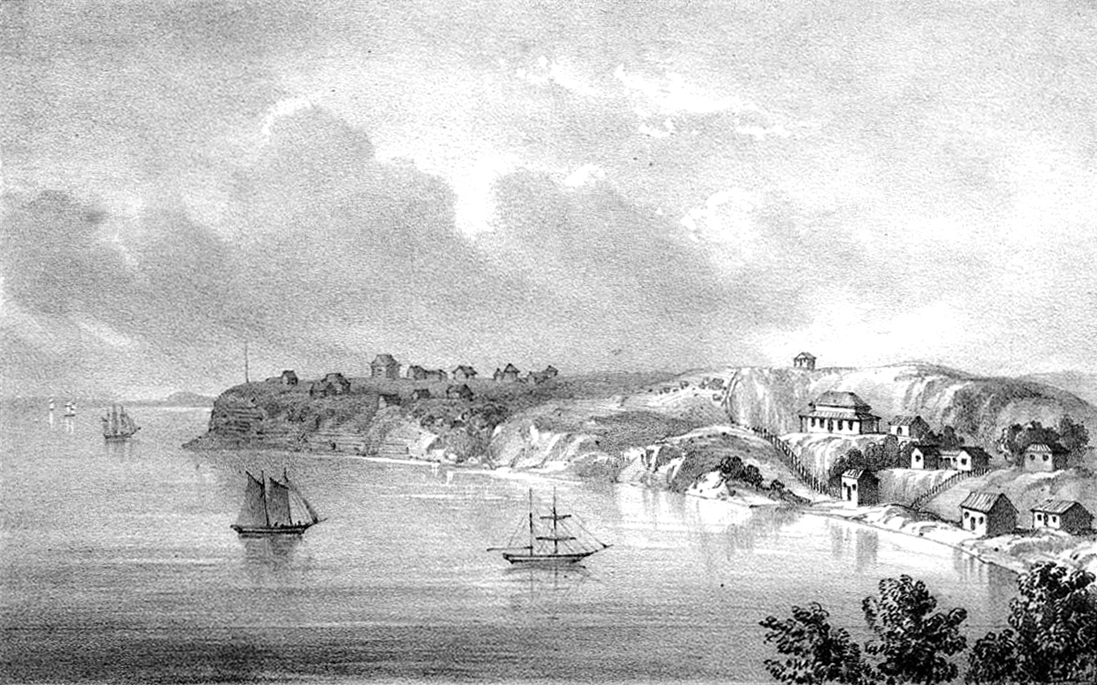
Fort Britomart from the west across Commercial Bay, Auckland, 1842. Artist: Joseph Jenner Merrett

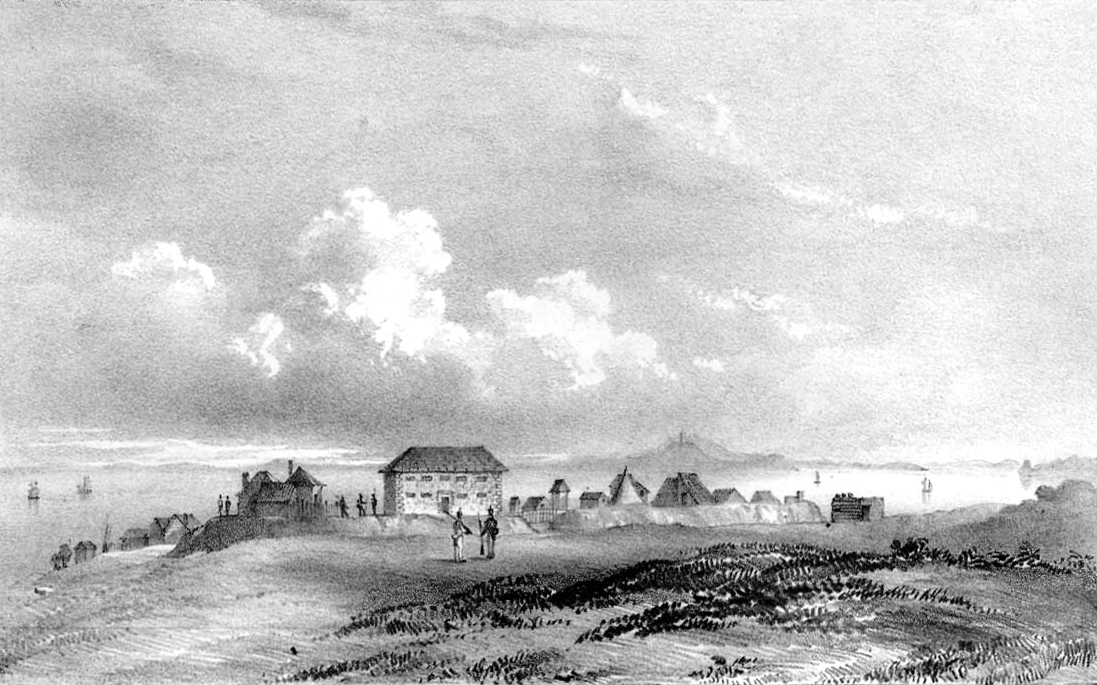
Fort Britomart, soldiers' barracks and the Waitematā Harbour from St Paul's Church, Auckland, 1842. Artist: Joseph Jenner Merrett

=== New South Wales ===
Back in Sydney, via Port Nicholson, by the brig Bristolian on 18 April 1842, Lugard married Margaret Anna McHenry, eldest daughter of the late John McHenry of Penrith, at St John's Church, Parramatta, on 14 May 1842, The birth of their first son, Henry John Lugard, followed on 15 July 1843, and his death at Doonmore, Penrith, on 27 December, age 5 months and 12 days. Order for his prompt return to England had arrived by the Bangalore in November 1843. After some 8.5 years in Australia and New Zealand, Lieutenant and Mrs Lugard sailed for London on the Kelso on 23 February 1844.

=== Ireland ===
Lugard, promoted 2nd Captain since 20 December 1844, reappeared settled in at Limerick in 1845 with the birth of another son, Edward John Lugard, on 2 January that year. He advanced to Commanding Royal Engineer of Limerick District in 1846, and of Dublin District in 1847, to rank of Captain on 14 April 1848, Major of the Brigade at Dublin headquarters of the Ordnance Department, from about 1849 and Lieutenant Colonel from 21 May 1855.

With new military camps required in Britain and Ireland for troops destined for the war in Crimea (1853–1856), General Sir John Burgoyne, RE, ordered a camp to be constructed for 10,000 infantry on the old military site of the Curragh, Kildare, Ireland, in January–February 1855. All design, working drawings, specifications, site planning, contracts and administration were carried out by the Commanding Royal Engineer in Ireland, Colonel Anthony Emmett, RE, and later his successor, Colonel Cowper Rose, RE, assisted by the Assistant Adjutant General, Lieutenant Colonel Lugard, RE, and Deputy Surveyor, Mr Sands. When the war with Russia ended in 1856, the need for such a camp ceased, however, its ability to accommodate and train a large numbers infantry, together with cavalry and artillery, on the 5000 acre drill ground of Curragh, ensured its continuation.

Lugard also prepared a detailed narrative of the project, containing plans of the camp and for each building, but as his services were called to the China Expedition of 1857 before its completion, the work was carried through to publishing by Captain George Archibald Leach, RE, in 1858.

=== China ===
Lugard was appointed Commanding Royal Engineer to the China expeditionary force accompanying the Earl of Elgin's special mission to China in 1857. Though the force assembled at Hong Kong that year, the unexpected rebellion in India reprioritised arrangements and forces destined for China were diverted away to Calcutta. Those diverted units included the newly formed 23rd Company, Royal Engineers, with their photograph equipment, upon their arrival in Singapore. Viscount Canning, Governor General of India, thought it to be about 100 sappers and miners.

The Times correspondent, George Wingrove Cooke, observed that in Hong Kong then: "our available land force for carrying on war with the Chinese empire consists of two generals, a very large body of officers, and about 1,000 men." Amongst them were Lugard's engineers—Captain Gother F. Mann, and Lieutenants William Stuart, Alexander Dirom and William Trench. On 11 October, Lugard expressed concern to General Thomas Ashburnham commanding the force, that the engineers' duties in the field were destroyed without a sufficient force of trained sappers. With many factors contributing to the impossibility of organising efficient substitutes, he urged that 23rd Company be shipped to Hong Kong at the earliest opportunity. Lieutenant Stuart took charge of a body of volunteer sappers, which he trained to a valuable capability. The 23rd Company carried on in India where they took part in recapturing Lucknow.

Whilst preparing for the operations upon Canton, Henry Williamson Lugard died on 30 November 1857, age 44 years. Cooke, wrote:

On the 1st, the death of Colonel Lugard, of the engineers, was announced, and on the 3rd he was buried with all military honours, in the cemetery hard by the racecourse. It was an imposing spectacle, for all the officers of all the European nations now present in Hongkong followed in long procession the gun-carriage on which he was borne to his grave. Many of those present not only knew him as an officer, whose loss at this critical moment is disastrous to the public service, but also loved the man. I was one of those who mourned to think we shall hear no more his frank hearty laugh, and receive no more his manly, soldier-like greeting. Poor Lugard was a victim to hard labour in this treacherous climate. He had much to do, and small materials to work with. He was a leader without soldiers. He had to form and fashion a corps of engineers and sappers and miners out of troops of the line. His labour was incessant, and he paid the penalty which these trying Hongkong heats almost always exact for over-exertion.

Captain Leach wrote:

Many deplore his untimely death, and the service has lost a valuable officer. His kindheartedness and other excellent qualities endeared him to all who knew him; and by the tact, judgement, and gentlemanly spirit and manner in which his duties were invariably conducted, he excited the zeal, stimulated the willing energies, and drew out the abilities of those who had the pleasure of serving under him.
