= Edward Lugard =

General The Right Honourable Sir Edward Lugard GCB
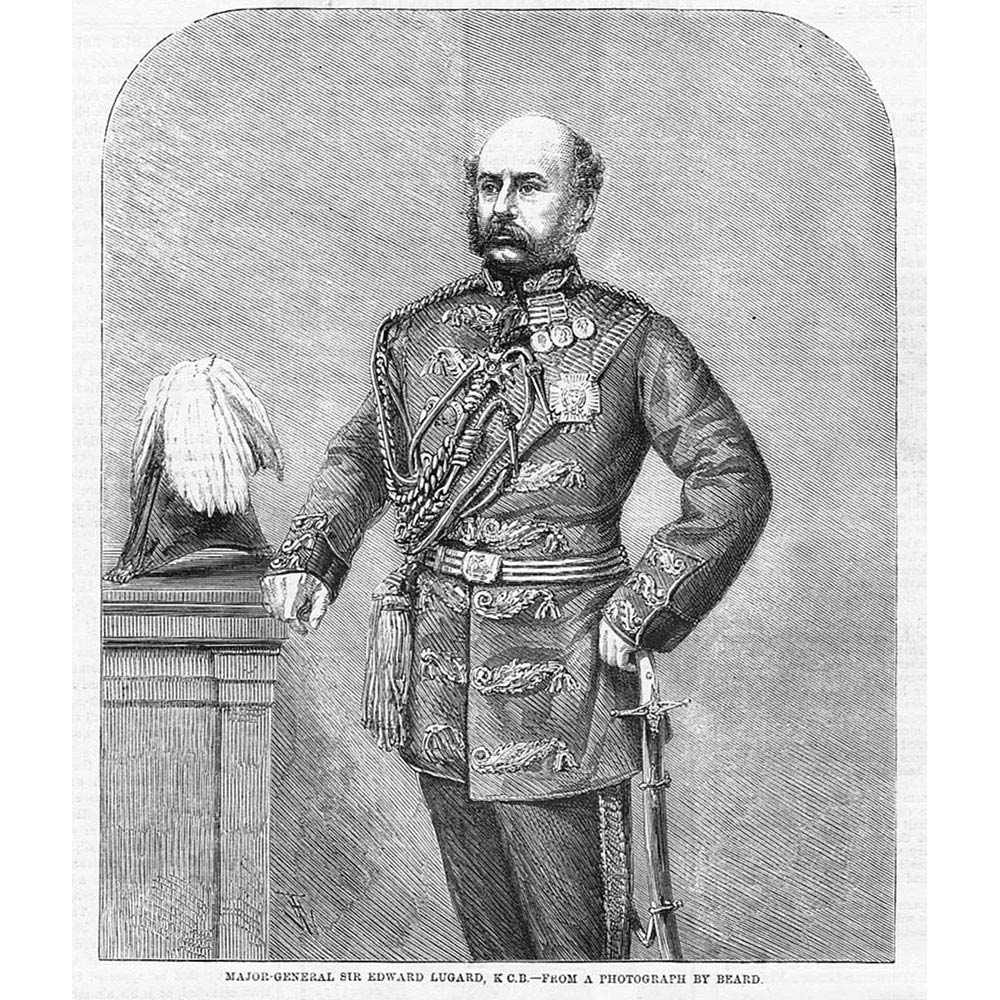
- Born: 8 May 1810; London, England
- Died: 31 October 1898 (aged 88)
- Relatives: Henry Lugard (brother); Frederick Lugard (nephew)
- Military career
- Allegiance: United Kingdom
- Branch: British Army
- Rank: General
- Commands: Adjutant-General in India (1857–58); 2nd Division (1857)
- Conflicts: First Afghan War; First Sikh War; Second Sikh War; Persian campaign Indian Rebellion
- Awards: Knight Grand Cross of the Order of the Bath

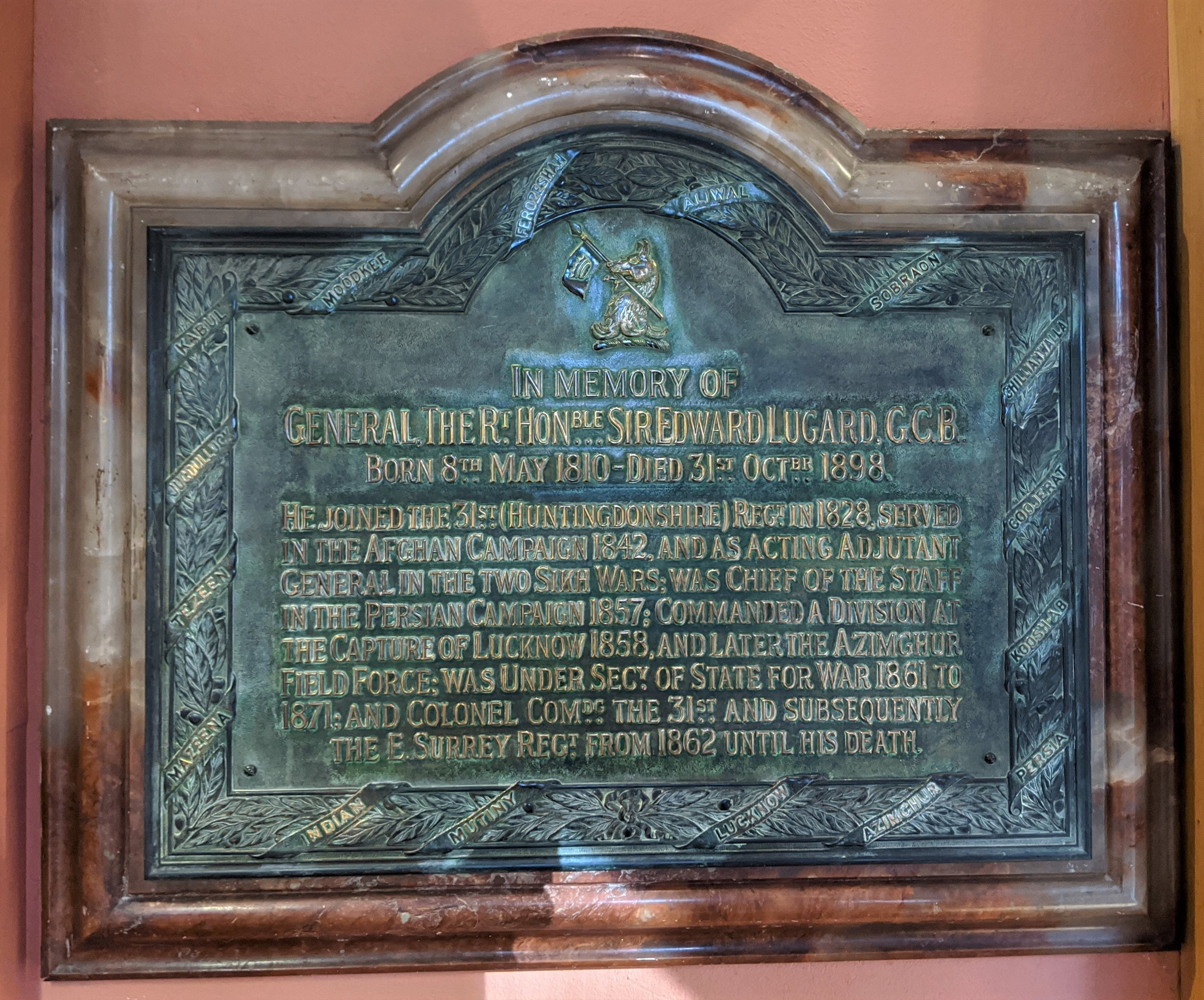
Memorial plaque to Lugard in All Saints Church, Kingston upon Thames, Surrey

Sir Edward Lugard, GCB, PC (8 May 1810 – 31 October 1898) was a British Army officer who served as Adjutant-General in India (1857–58) and later as Permanent Under-Secretary of State for War (1861–71) at the War Office.

== Early life ==
Lugard was son of Captain John Lugard (1761–1843), of the 6th (Inniskilling) Dragoons, Adjutant and Secretary at the Duke of York's Military Asylum, Chelsea, and his wife Jane Llewellyn Trewman (c. 1781–1861), daughter of Robert Trewman (1738/9–1802), of Exeter, Devon, a printer and proprietor of Trewman's Exeter Flying Post, of a family recorded at Exeter since the 1500s. Edward Lugard's elder brother, the Rev. Frederick Grueber Lugard, vicar of Norton-juxta-Kempsey, Worcester, was father of the explorer and colonial administrator Frederick Lugard, 1st Baron Lugard.

== Military career ==
Commissioned as an Ensign in the 31st Regiment of Foot in August 1828, Lugard fought in the Battle of Kabul in 1842 during the First Anglo-Afghan War. He then served in the First Sikh War (1845–46), taking part in the battles of Moodkee, Aliwal and Sobraon, later also serving in the Second Sikh War (1848–49). He became Adjutant General for the Punjab District in 1848, then Deputy Adjutant General in Bombay in 1854, before acting as Chief of Staff during the Persian campaign (1856–57), and Adjutant-General in India from July 1857. He commanded the 2nd Division at the Capture of Lucknow in 1858 during the Indian Rebellion, and became a Knight Commander of the Order of the Bath in January 1858.

After nearly three decades in India, Lugard returned to the United Kingdom in 1859 where he served as Permanent Under-Secretary of State for War at the War Office from 1861 to 1871. Advanced to Knight Grand Cross of the Order of the Bath in March 1867, he became a Privy Councillor in November 1871 and was promoted to the rank of General in November 1872.

In 1862 he was appointed Colonel of the 31st (Huntingdonshire) Regiment of Foot, which amalgamated in 1881 with the 70th Foot to form the East Surrey Regiment, after which he was Colonel of the 1st Battalion of the new regiment until his death in 1898, aged 88.

There is a memorial plaque to Lugard in All Saints Church, Kingston upon Thames, Surrey.

== Personal life ==
In 1837, Lugard married Isabella Mowbray Hart (d. 1868), daughter of Henry Hart, MD, of Bishopwearmouth, County Durham; he married secondly, in 1871, Martha (1846–1922), daughter of Joseph Fullbrook, of Chelsea, and a cousin of the distinguished soldier Major-General Charles Fullbrook-Leggatt.

Military offices
Preceded by Henry Havelock	Adjutant-General, India; 1857–1858	Succeeded by William Pakenham
