= Hive shipwreck =

Hive Shipwreck
- Location within Jervis Bay Territory
- 35°10′07″S 150°38′07″E
- Location: Bherwerre Beach, Jervis Bay Territory, Australia

New South Wales Heritage Register
- Official name: Hive Shipwreck
- Type: State heritage (archaeological-maritime)
- Designated: 1 April 2010
- Reference no.: 1812
- Type: Shipwreck
- Category: Transport – Water
- Builders: Deptford, Kent United Kingdom

The Hive Shipwreck is a heritage-listed shipwreck site of the Hive, a former convict transportation ship located approximately 40 metres (130 ft) off Bherwerre Beach, Jervis Bay Territory, Australia. It was added to the New South Wales State Heritage Register on 1 April 2010.

== History ==
The Hive represents the only known ship wrecked on mainland Australia while carrying convicts. Two other ships, the George III and Neva were wrecked in Tasmanian waters. All three were lost during 1835.

A colourful period of the colony's history, the loss of the Hive was an important event, occurring in the largely unsurveyed region of Jervis Bay, New South Wales. The valuable cargo of £10,000 of specie for the Commissariat was successfully salvaged, although later work resulted in the further loss of the Government schooner Blackbird. Local identities such as Alexander Berry, aided the rescue of some 300 people on board, including passengers, soldiers, crew and 250 convicts.

Importantly, the wreck event contributed to the naming of the bight Wreck Bay, a name that was to become well earned.

=== The wreck ===
Built in the United Kingdom at Deptford, Kent in 1820, the Hive was ship rigged with two decks, a square stern and quarter galleries. Mounting a female bust figurehead, the vessel was 37 metres (120 ft) in length and of 440 tonnes (480 short tons).

Sailing from Falmouth, Cornwall, United Kingdom, to Port Jackson on 8 February 1834, the Hive brought out its first cargo of 250 male prisoners.

Suffering extreme conditions and a protracted 123 day voyage, the prison temperature reached an alarming 38 °C (100 °F). Surgeon George Fairfowl, with a humanitarian gesture, allowed 60 prisoners to sleep on deck, changing shifts every four hours.

Picking up convicts at Dublin then Cork in Ireland, the Hive departed on 24 August 1835 on the second and fateful voyage. The Hive made the passage with the death of only one prisoner. However, when turning up the east coast of Australia, events took a turn for the worse. Having not touched land the entire voyage, the transport crawled up the coast towards final disembarkation at Sydney. The Hive sailed on during the night of 10 December 1835, but soon found itself driven ashore a total wreck at Wreck Bay.

On board was Captain John Nutting in command of the 250 Irish male prisoners, Chief Officer Edward Kenny, Ensign Kelly of the 17th Regiment, Surgeon Superintendent John Donohoe Esq, RN, Lieutenant Lugard of the 31st Regiment, Henry Lugard, Royal Engineers and 29 rank and file soldiers of the 28th Regiment. In addition, there were eight women and 11 children.

About midday on the 10 December, the Hive had sighted land in the vicinity of Montague Island. The chief officer, Edward Kenny thought the vessel to be only 13 to 14 kilometres (8 to 9 mi) off the coast. Informing the captain, his concern was not shared and Captain Nutting continued a course bringing the vessel closer to shore. Kenny attempted to have the course altered again, but to no avail.

Captain Nutting advised him to mind his own business and that one person is sufficient to navigate the ship. Cautious of danger, Kenny decided not to sleep after the change of the night watch.

The Hive continued under full sail following the captain's instructions. At about 9.30pm, Kenny again tried to convince third mate Thomas Morgan, then on watch, to reduce sail. Not wishing, or daring, to disobey his captain, the vessel plied on into the dark and cloudy night.

Two lookouts were stationed in the forecastle and one on the lee side gangway watching for any sight of land. Some time before 10pm a prisoner reported to Ensign Kelly that he had seen land on the starboard bow. Morgan and the other Officer of the Watch assured Kelly that it was cloud that could be seen as they had been observing it rising for some time. At 10pm Morgan came below decks to break some the news to Chief Officer Kenny that there was something white on the port bow that looked like breakers. Kenny rushed on deck and ordered the wheel to be turned hard-a-port. On these vessels this action was designed to turn the vessel to starboard. It was too late for manoeuvring however and the Hive began running through the sand on a gently shelving beach. Luckily for those on board, the vessel did not strike any rocks and there was no violent impact. Ensign Kelly proceeded by land to gain help, carrying a letter about the wreck from Surgeon Donohoe. With the aid of Aboriginal people from the Wreck Bay area, he found the farm of John Lamb on Friday morning, then proceeded to the farm of Alexander Berry in the Shoalhaven. A message was dispatched to Wollongong and from there to Port Jackson. The wreck produced much excitement in Sydney and great numbers of the town's people came to the Dock Yard and other places where information might be obtained about the accident.

The shipwreck victims on Bherwerre Beach were not altogether isolated. In addition to help from Sydney, the Aboriginal community also provided a communication link between Surgeon Donohoe and Alexander Berry.

Alexander Berry, at his own expense, sent his well manned schooner Edward to the scene of the disaster. In a letter to authorities in Sydney, Berry believed that the Hive might again be got afloat if under the direction of an able commander. Nutting however refused all aid until permission arrived from Sydney. By Sunday, the Government revenue cutter Prince George was dispatched to the wreck with the brig-of-war HMS Zebra under command of Captain McRae and the steam packet Tamar with a detachment of the 17th Regiment.

On 15 December, the Bower anchor was carried out into 6.7 metres (22 ft) of water. Another anchor was carried out on 17 December but a southerly arrived that evening and both anchors "came home". By 20 December Captain Nutting considered any further attempts to keep the ship intact were hopeless.

The Tamar returned to Sydney on 16 December with the Hive's surgeon, Donohoe, Lt. Lugard, part of the guard and 106 convicts. HMS Zebra returned with the specie, the mails, stores, 94 prisoners and ten soldiers from the 28th Regiment, before returning to the wreck to pick up the remainder.

The schooner Edward brought up part of the crew and some of the Hive's stores. By this time, Hive was reported to be lying on the beach with its keel broken and water flowing over the orlop deck. The Hive remained virtually intact in the surf zone, although all knew it would break apart during the first big storm. The former Government schooner Blackbird had returned from New Zealand on 4 January with a cargo of timber, potatoes and yams. Having discharged its cargo, the schooner was then engaged to salvage the vessel's stores left onshore, departing Sydney on 11 January 1836. The Blackbird, a colonial vessel of 61 tonnes (67 short tons), was built in 1828 at the Government dockyard at Moreton Bay.

A serious accident befell this small vessel while engaged on the first day of salvage work on 15 January. Having anchored three point two kilometres (two miles) out into the bay, the vessel's "whaleboats" were used to ferry the bulk of the salvaged goods in 22 trips. Returning to the laden schooner at nightfall, a sudden gale greeted the crew about 9pm. Unable to stop the anchor dragging, the crew attempted to hoist sail and get the Blackbird underway. Time was running out and anchors were dropped as the vessel drew nearer the beach. Securing the schooner for half an hour, the first anchor cable parted, then the other, together with the windlass.

With howling winds, rain and lightning, the little vessel was thrown towards the beach. Salvaged cargo was jettisoned to lighten the load. A decision was made to raise all sail and run the vessel onto the beach. Striking the sand several times, at 2.30am on the morning of the 16 January, the Blackbird was carried high onto the beach and out of danger.

== Description ==
The shipwreck remains were detected by the Heritage Branch in 1994 lying 1.8 to 2.5 metres (5 ft 11 in to 8 ft 2 in) below sand in approximately 2 metres (6 ft 7 in) water depth, mid way along Bherwerre Beach, under the surf zone. Consisting of buried timbers, analysed as British oak, the wreck lies beneath the surf zone approximately 40 metres (130 ft) out from shore. Covering 15 by 8 metres (49 ft × 26 ft) in area, the remains have high archaeological potential (below). Probe soundings indicate that a portion of the lower hull and perhaps deck levels may survive with the potential that the site has maintained a high level of integrity. The associated remains of the survivors camp site on Bherwerre Beach includes fragments of bottled glass, ceramics and coke which may have derived from the ships stoves and or heaters. This site also retains high archaeological potential with potential to document items related to cargo, convicts and crew, together with contact with local Aboriginal peoples of the region.

=== Condition ===
As at 26 September 1997, the site has the potential to document convict vessel construction, fitting out and victualling during the important phase of later convict transportation to NSW. The Hive is one of three convict vessels wrecked in Australian waters carrying convicts.

At this stage, it appears that substantial remains of the lower ship have survived in the surf zone but only a scatter of debris have survived beneath the beach sand. The survivors camp, while heavily disturbed by later grazing and souveniring, retains personal and sundry items, along with evidence of stores recovered from the ship.

=== Modifications and dates ===
Fitted out for convict transportation in 1834 and 1835.

=== Further information ===
The Hive wreck site is unique in NSW as a vessel lost during the important later phase of convict transportation to NSW. The circumstances leading to the loss, the wrecking, rescue of survivors and salvage documents a colourful period in Australian history and represents a site type extremely rare in Australian waters.

== Heritage listing ==
As at 22 September 2009, The Hive is significant in representing the period of convict transportation to Australia and the interaction between the survivors of shipwreck and Aborigines. The ship, its cargo, crew, military personnel and convicts were part of the later period of highly organised convict transportation. The hull could provide important information about the construction and fitting out of one of Her Majesty's prison ships. Artefacts associated with the hull might provide important insights into the cargo and items related to crew, soldiers and convicts on board. The Hive represents one of only three convict ships wrecked in Australian waters while transporting their human cargo.

Hive Shipwreck was listed on the New South Wales State Heritage Register on 1 April 2010 having satisfied the following criteria.

The place is important in demonstrating the course, or pattern, of cultural or natural history in New South Wales.

The wreck of the convict transport Hive and the associated survivor camp are significant through their association with, and are representative of, the later period of convict transportation to Australia. The loss of Hive appears to have aroused interest in the colony at Sydney, and influenced the subsequent naming of Wreck Bay. Events surrounding the loss illustrate important aspects of the quality of leadership associated with convict transportation and of the participation of notable NSW colonial figures, such as Alexander Berry, in the rescue operations.

The place has a strong or special association with a person, or group of persons, of importance of cultural or natural history of New South Wales's history.

The Hive shipwreck and survivor camp are significant because they represent positive contact and beneficial interaction between colonial figures in NSW and the local Aboriginal community. The events surrounding the loss of the Hive demonstrate some of the best examples available of the successful employment of the official European Policy on contact with the Aboriginal populations, that of least-conflict, constructive engagement and mutual respect. Wreck Bay Aboriginal Community members and other Kooris are proud to have been actively involved in the development of the shared cultural heritage resulting from the Hive shipwreck and survivor camp, and it has special significance to them. The local Aboriginal community developed strong associations and friendships with the early settlers and actively assisted with the rescue of people from the Hive through the provision of guides with expert knowledge of the local area.

The place is important in demonstrating aesthetic characteristics and/or a high degree of creative or technical achievement in New South Wales.

As a prison-ship, Hive demonstrates a high degree of technical innovation and design modernisation, and is therefore of State significance. The extant remains exhibit a "new" design of prison implemented in 1817 and abandoned shortly after. Hive is unique in that it is thought to be the only known convict ship wrecked on the mainland whilst carrying convicts and is the only example of this type and style of colonial prison-ship technology. The only two other convict transport losses were wrecked in Tasmania, and both of these were constructed of the previous traditional (reinstated) design. Neither of the Tasmanian vessels are intact enough to provide any real information regarding their construction and fit-out.

The place has a strong or special association with a particular community or cultural group in New South Wales for social, cultural or spiritual reasons.

The shipwreck Hive has state level of social significance. The long-held and strong association with the cultural aspects of the Hive is evidenced by the importance that the Wreck Bay Aboriginal Community places on both the shipwreck and survivor camp on an ongoing basis. The Hive shipwreck features heavily in their stories, and is part of that Community's living history. This connection with the Wreck Bay Community is further recognised by the people of NSW generally, and the maritime archaeology/ history community specifically, as evidenced by the considerable interest in the discovery and management of the shipwreck from both electronic and print media within NSW and interstate.

The place has potential to yield information that will contribute to an understanding of the cultural or natural history of New South Wales.

The Hive shipwreck and survivor camp have research potential because of the survival rate of in situ extant remains as a result of the nature, location and environment of the site. As the buried hull is thought to be relatively intact, this State significant site has the potential to reveal information about the prison-ship technology and construction techniques of the period. Timber and metallurgical analysis of the remains may enhance knowledge of the choice of methods and materials employed in construction, and may help to determine whether the Navy Board reverted to the previous design as a result of shipbuilding tradition, cost implications, material resources and /or labour shortages or for other reasons. The Hive shipwreck and survivor camp sites are identified to be of State significance in terms of their potential to inform understanding of shipboard/survivor life, gender roles, and shipboard practices of the period. Wider archaeological and palaeoenvironmental evidence may assist research on site formation and decay processes and the examination of physical, chemical and biological processes on cultural remains or through its potential for public education.

The place possesses uncommon, rare or endangered aspects of the cultural or natural history of New South Wales.

The Hive demonstrates a high degree of rarity and State significance as the wreck is one of only three convict transports wrecked in Australian waters whilst carrying convicts, and the only convict transport wrecked on the Australian mainland to have been located. Rarity is increased as the Hive is also the only convict shipwreck in Australia to have an associated survivor camp, the only one with potential do demonstrate the "new" prison design implemented in 1817 and relinquished shortly after. Hive is possibly the most intact of all three Australian convict transport wreck sites, and the only one located in NSW.

The place is important in demonstrating the principal characteristics of a class of cultural or natural places/environments in New South Wales.

The Hive has a high level of State significance as it is highly representative of colonial British ships and shipping of the period, and highly representative of the later period of convict transportation (1830–1840) to Australia. During this ten-year period, the total number of convicts transported was greater than the combined number from any other period. The Hive is the only surviving relatively intact example of a purpose-built prison-ship from the early 1800s (the New Zealand migrant vessel Edwin Fox 1853 being a converted Moulmein trader), and is therefore important in demonstrating the principal characteristics of this style and class of vessel, and the important socio-economic and political situation it represents.

== See also ==
- List of shipwrecks of Australia
- Wreck Bay Village, Jervis Bay Territory
