= Bherwerre Beach, Jervis Bay Territory =

Beach in Jervis Bay Territory, Australia

Bherwherre Beach Five Mile Beach
- Beach
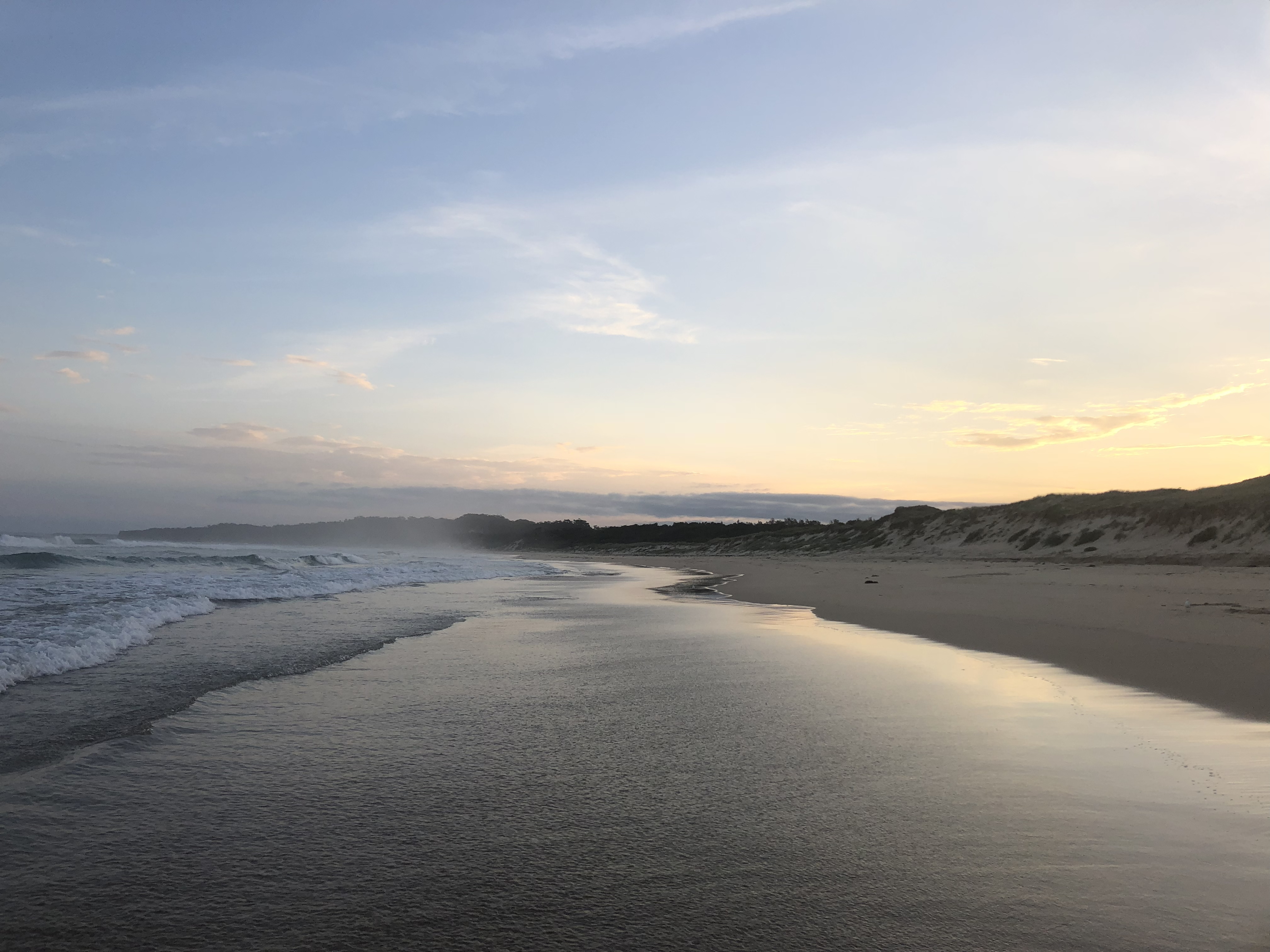
- A view of the beach, facing west towards Sussex Inlet

- Coordinates: 35.172402°S 150.611640°E
- Location: Booderee National Park, Jervis Bay Territory

Dimensions
  - Length: 7 km (4.3 mi)

Bherwerre Beach (sometimes known as Five Mile Beach) is a long beach located in Booderee National Park, Jervis Bay Territory, Australia. It is approximately 7 kilometres (4.3 mi) long and is bordered by Cave Beach to the east and Sussex Inlet to the west.

== History ==
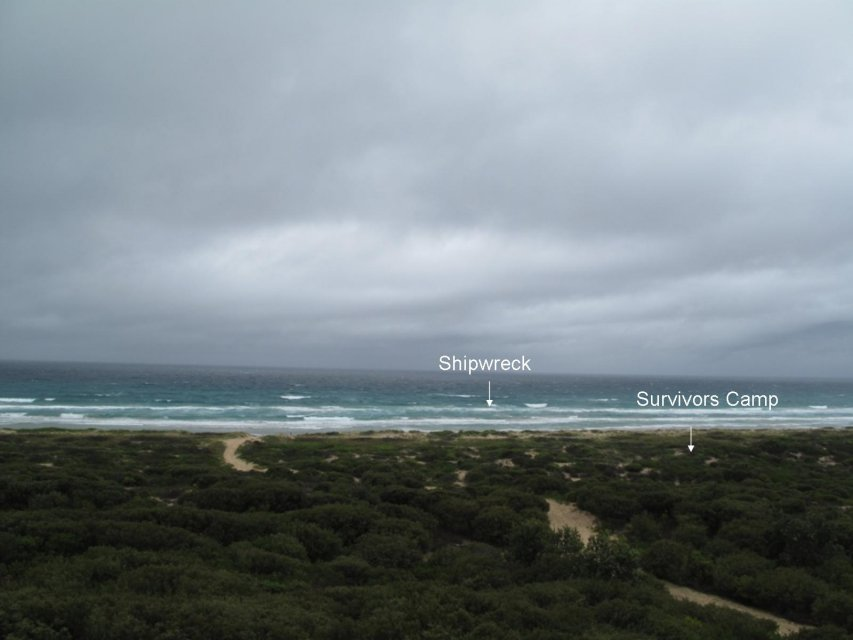
Location of shipwreck and its survivors' camp

On the night of 10 December 1835, the convict transportation ship Hive, carrying convicts from Dublin, Ireland, ran aground on the beach and was subsequently shipwrecked after being removed from the beach. The shipwreck was eventually found by New South Wales' Heritage Office in 1994, approximately 40 metres (130 ft) from shore under approximately 1.8–2.5 metres (5.9–8.2 ft) of sand at a depth of approximately 2 metres (6.6 ft). It was subsequently added to the NSW State Heritage Register in April 2010.

== Fauna ==
The beach and the surrounding dunes are a known habitat for many species of birds, including the pied oystercatcher, the hooded plover, the wandering albatross, the white-headed petrel, the providence petrel, the Salvin's prion, the Antarctic prion, the wedge-tailed shearwater, the brown booby, the white-necked heron, the whistling kite, the brown falcon, the red-capped plover, the ruddy turnstone, the bar-tailed godwit, the curlew sandpiper, the caspian tern, the white-throated needletail, the golden-headed cisticola, the chestnut-rumped heathwren, the buff-rumped thornbill and the white-fronted chat.

== Gallery ==
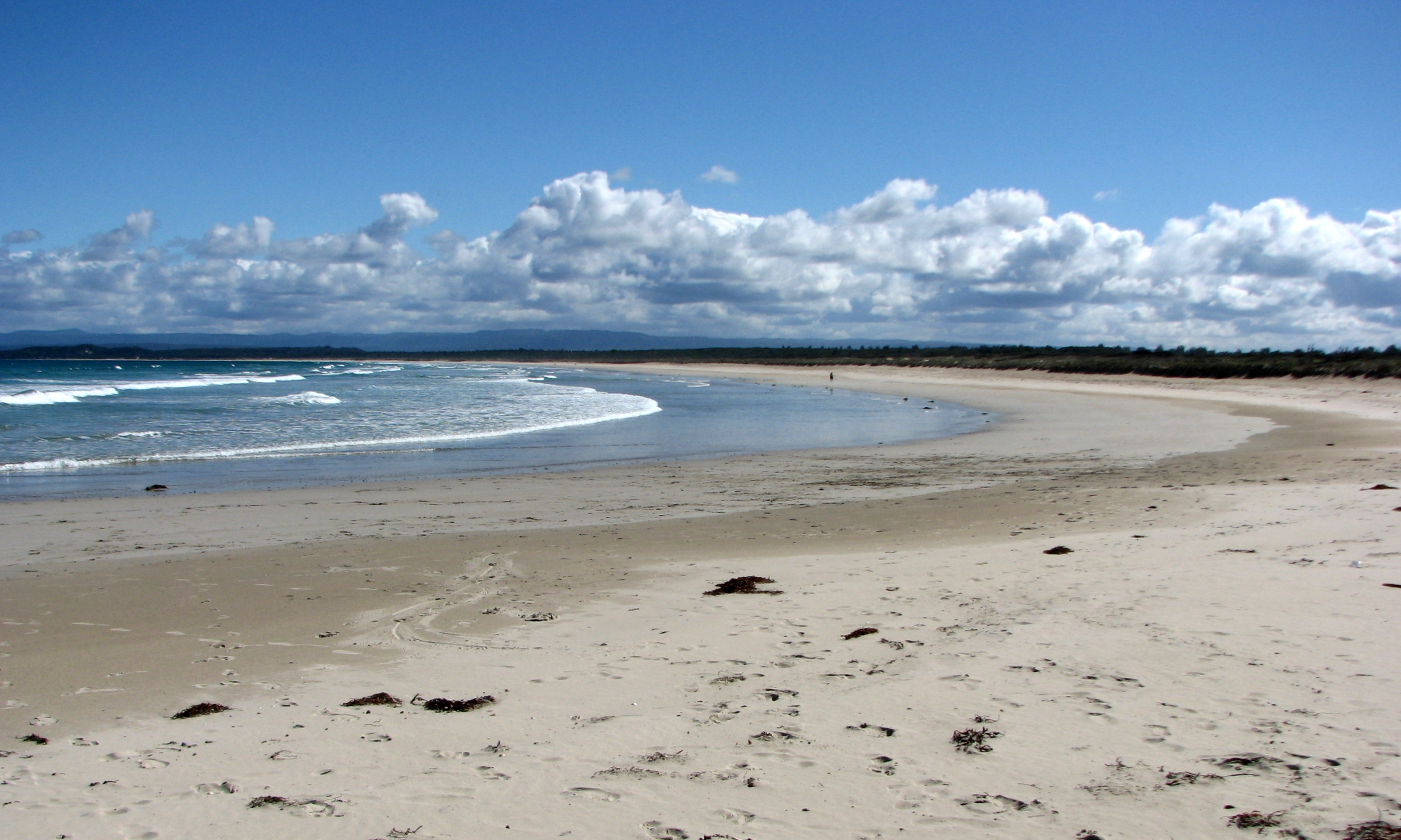
Bherwerre Beach from the eastern side, looking west

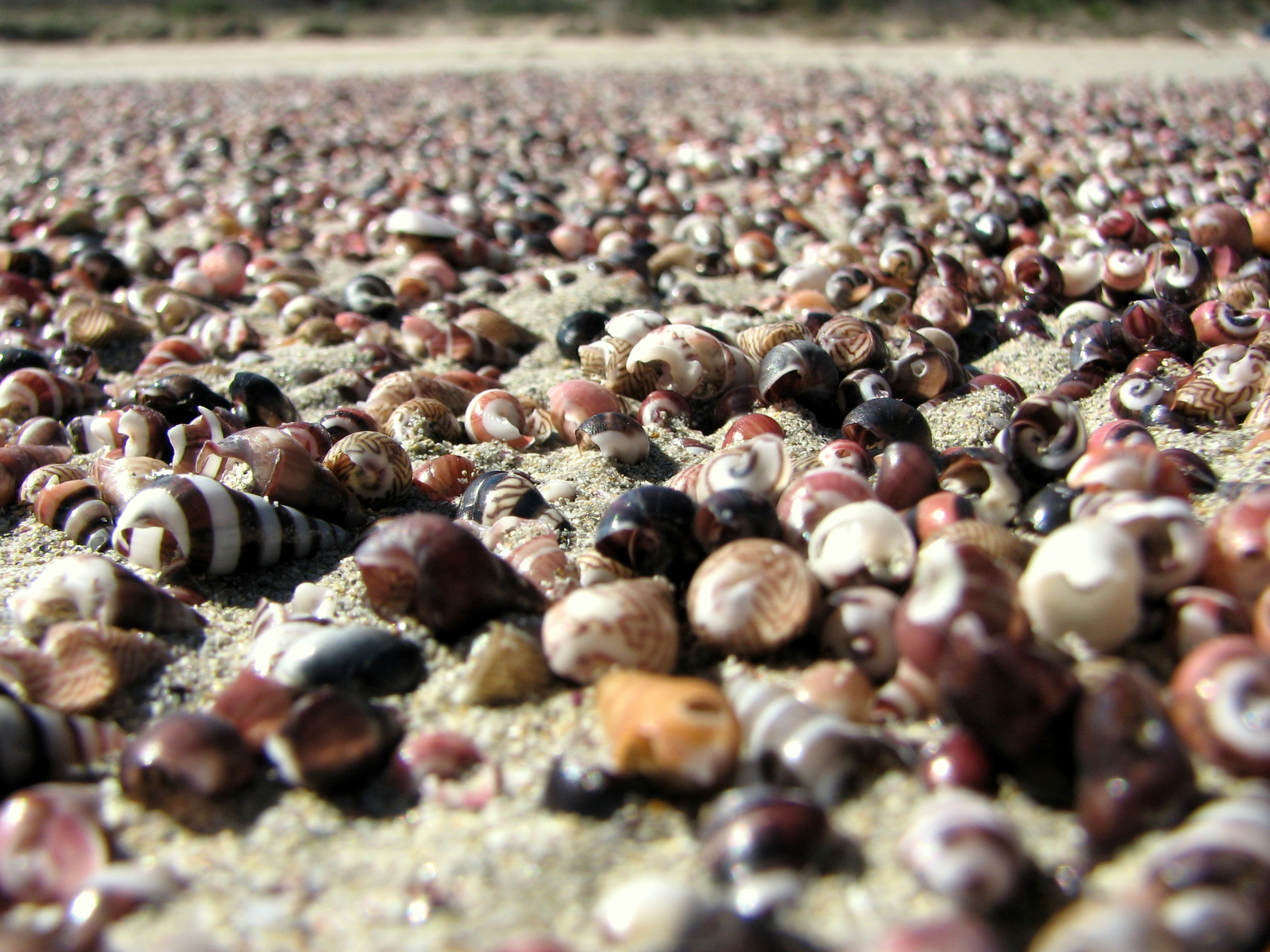
Shells on the beach

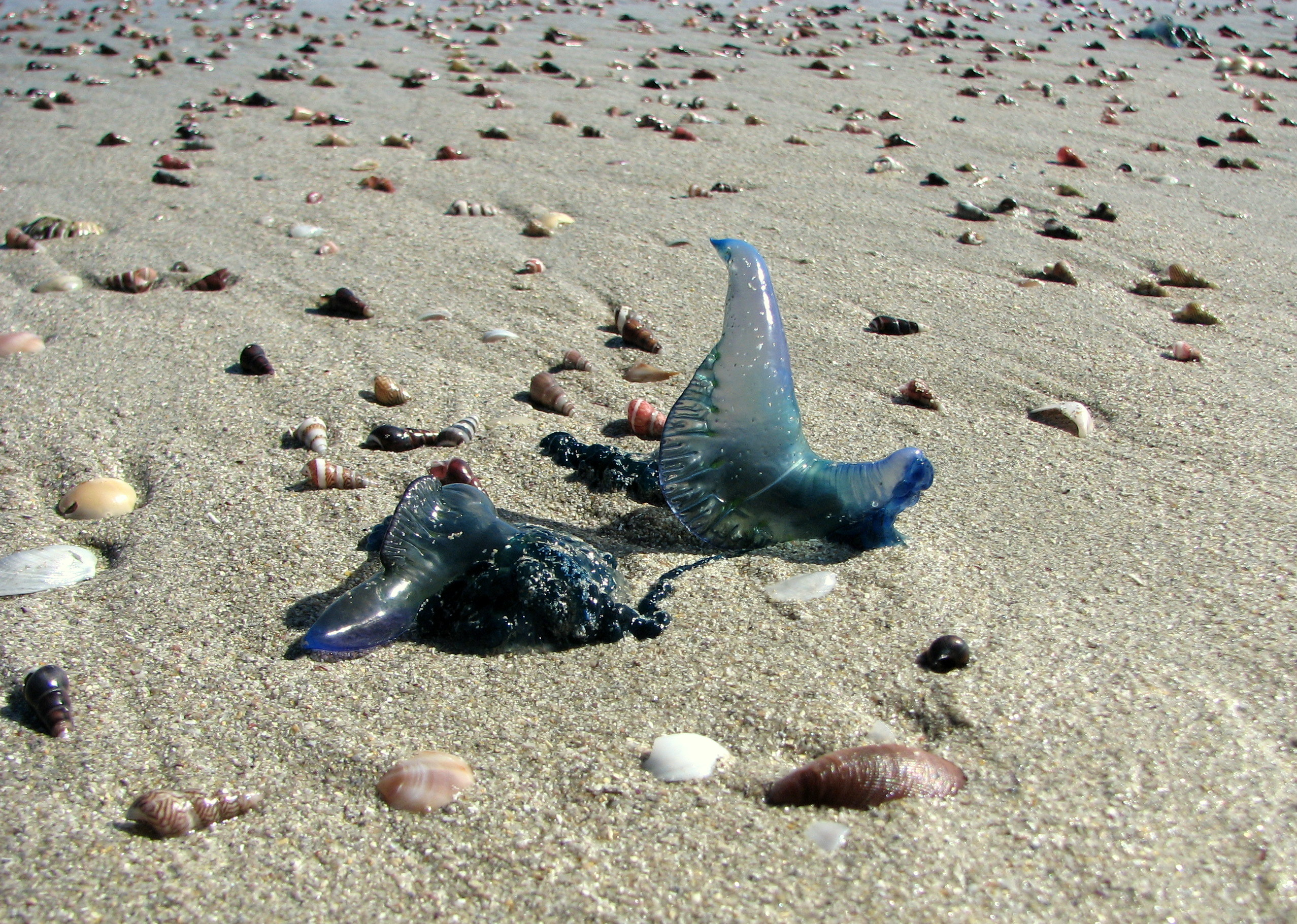
A Portuguese man o' war, commonly known as a blue bottle in Australia, on the beach

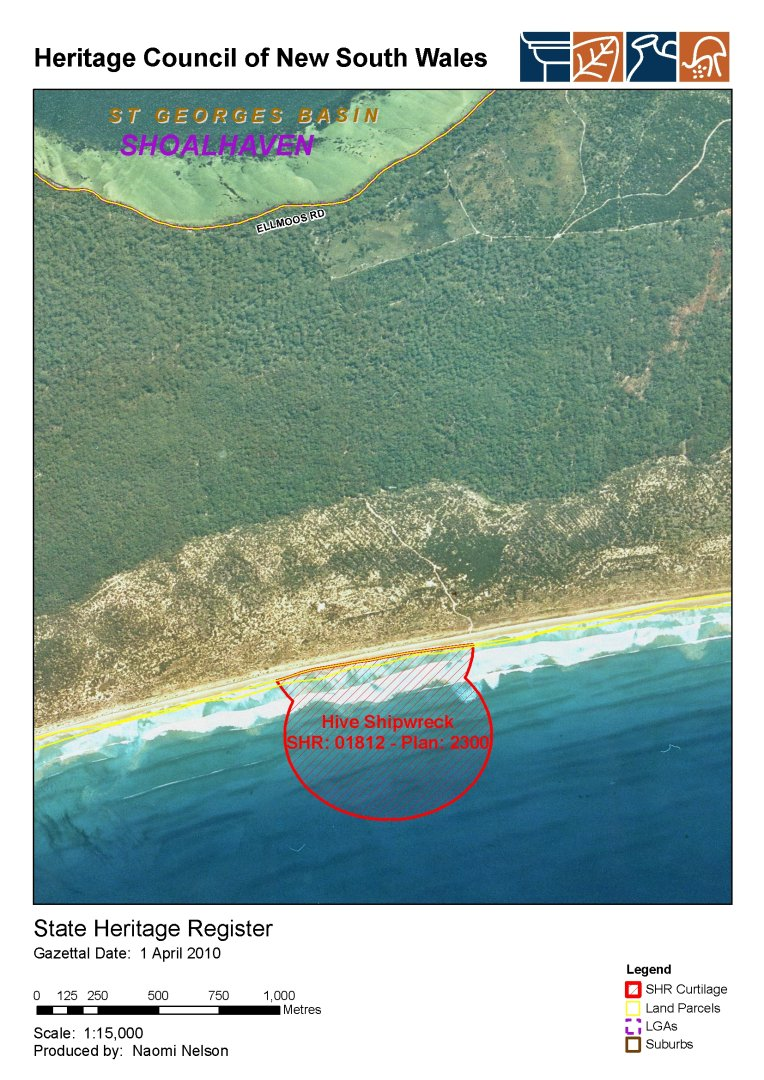
State Heritage Register's map of the Hive shipwreck

== See also ==
- Sussex Inlet, New South Wales
- Booderee National Park and Botanic Gardens
- Jervis Bay Territory
