= Hive (1820) =

History

United Kingdom
- Name: Hive
- Launched: 1820, Deptford
- Fate: Wrecked 10 December 1835

General characteristics
- Tons burthen: 485 (bm)
- Length: 120 feet
- Propulsion: Sail

Hive was built in 1820 at Deptford, England. She made two voyages transporting convicts to New South Wales. She was wrecked on 10 December 1835 during the second of these voyages.

First convict voyage (1834): Under the command of John Luscombe, she left Portsmouth on 29 January 1834, carrying 250 male convicts. Hive arrived in Sydney on 11 June 1834 and had two deaths en route.

Second convict voyage (1835): Hive left Ireland, under the command of John Nutting in late August 1835, carrying 250 male convicts. While travelling up the east coast of New South Wales, she ran aground south of Jervis Bay at a site now known as Wreck Bight on 10 December 1835 and was wrecked. Two convicts had died en route; a crew member died in the mishap. The steamship Tamar ( (United Kingdom of Great Britain and Ireland) New South Wales), HMS Zebra (Royal Navy), and a revenue cutter rescued the survivors.

== See also ==
- Hive shipwreck
