= Anthony Emmett =

British Army officer

Major-General Anthony Emmett
- Born: 1790; Kingston-upon-Hull
- Died: 27 March 1872 (aged 81–82); Brighton
- Burial place: Brighton
- Education: Royal Military Academy, Woolwich
- Military career
- Allegiance: United Kingdom
- Branch: British Army
- Service years: 1808–1855
- Rank: Major-General
- Unit: Royal Engineers
- Commands: CRE, St Helena; CRE, Ireland
- Conflicts: Napoleonic Wars; Peninsular War; First Siege of Badajoz; Second Siege of Badajoz; Battle of El Bodón; Siege of Ciudad Rodrigo; Third Siege of Badajoz (WIA); Battle of the Nive; Battle of Garris; Battle of Orthez; Battle of Toulouse; War of 1812; Battle of New Orleans; Siege of Fort Bowyer
- Awards: Military General Service Medal with 4 clasps

Major-General Anthony Emmett (1790 – 27 March 1872) was a British Army officer, who served his entire career in the Royal Engineers. He fought throughout the Peninsular War, and participated in the last battles of the War of 1812. After that, he served as Commanding Royal Engineer, St Helena, during Napoleon's incarceration on the island. Emmett retired in 1855, because of injuries he had taken forty-three years earlier at the Third Siege of Badajoz.

== Life ==
Emmett as born in Kingston-Upon-Hull, and after passing through the Royal Military Academy, Woolwich, he received his commission as second lieutenant in the Royal Engineers on 16 February 1808. He joined the army in the Iberian Peninsula early in 1809, and remained with it until the summer of 1812, when he was sent to England for recovery from the effects of a very severe wound received while leading on one of the columns to the assault of Badajoz in April 1812.

He returned to the army in October of the following year at his own request, and remained with it to the close of the war. During his service in Peninsular War he was constantly before the enemy. First, in Abrantes and skirmishes near it, while the French were in front of the lines of Lisbon; secondly, at both the sieges of Badajoz in 1811, at the cavalry affair of El Boden, and in the trenches before Ciudad Rodrigo; and thirdly, at the siege of Badajoz in 1812, when he led on the Portuguese column of the 4th division to the assault of the breach of the curtain, and was severely wounded. He was shortly after sent to England for the restoration of his health.

Prior to the siege he was occupied in improving the navigation of the Upper Douro to facilitate the transfer of supplies for the operations in Badajoz. On rejoining the army as a captain in 1813 he was employed in the examination of the fords of the Nive, held by the enemy's posts prior to the successful passage of that river. During the following campaign he was attached to the 2nd division, and was present at the battle of St. Pierre, near Bayonne, at the attack on the heights of Garres St.-Palais at Tarbes, and at the battles of Orthez and Toulouse. Soon after his return to England he was sent, in 1815, with General Keane, on the expedition against New Orleans, landed with the advance, and was present in the attack of the Americans, also at the assault made on the enemy's lines and at the siege of Fort Bowyer.

He was next appointed commanding royal engineer at St. Helena, where he went with Sir Hudson Lowe, and held the command until after the death of Napoleon. He held various commands at home, at Bermuda, and in the Mediterranean, until he was compelled in May 1855 to retire as a major-general on account of bad health brought on by the wounds he received in the Peninsula. He was awarded the war medal and four clasps. He died at Brighton on 27 March 1872.
