= Trewman's Exeter Flying Post =

American newspaper (1763–1917)

Trewman's Exeter Flying Post was a weekly newspaper published in Exeter between 1763 and 1917.

Robert Trewman (1738/39–1802) and William Andrews quarrelled with Andrew Brice, printer of the Old Exeter Journal or the Weekly Advertiser, which was in print from 1746 to 1766, and they parted ways with Brice to establish the Exeter Mercury or West Country Advertiser.

After several changes of title, the newspaper became known as Trewman's Exeter Flying Post. Trewman's widow, son Robert (d. 1816) and grandson Robert James Trewman (d. 1860) continued the paper, before it was bought by James Bellerby.

By 1870 the newspaper advertised itself as "the oldest and most extensively circulated Conservative newspaper in the West of England". Its local competitors were the Western Times and the Exeter Gazette.

The title Exeter Flying Post was revived from 1976 to 2012 by an alternative newspaper (later a magazine) covering local news, arts, events and community affairs. At first it appeared fortnightly, but it was later published monthly or bi-monthly.
