= Virginia, Mayfield =

Virginia
- Location within New South Wales Location within Australia
- 35.2228°S 149.8408°E
- Location: Charleyong Road, Mayfield, Queanbeyan-Palerang Region, New South Wales, Australia

History
- Built: 1830–1925

Site notes
- Owner: Water NSW

New South Wales Heritage Register
- Official name: Virginia; Virginia - Welcome Reef Dam
- Type: state heritage (built)
- Designated: 18 November 1999
- Reference no.: 1374
- Type: Homestead Complex
- Category: Farming and Grazing

Virginia is a heritage-listed homestead and former pastoral property at Charleyong Road, Mayfield, Queanbeyan-Palerang Region, New South Wales, Australia. It was built from 1830 to 1925. It was added to the New South Wales State Heritage Register on 18 November 1999.

== History ==
The Roberts family settled in the Braidwood district in the mid-1830s, and have associations with the pastoral properties known as Mayfield, Virginia and Ooranook.

John Cocking, born in Nottingham in 1791, was married to Anna Maria Whitmore in London in 1816. It appears that the couple had eight children born between 1816 and 1834, and also changed their surname to Roberts during this time. In 1834, Maria Roberts and her children boarded the Margaret bound for Sydney, Australia, accompanied by her brother-in-law Robert Roberts (who had also changed his name) and his wife Mary. It is not known when John Roberts arrived in Sydney, but it is speculated that he had arrived before his wife and brother to search for suitable land for the families to settle. It is also possible that John Roberts was a "remittance man", meaning that his family paid him to stay away.

Shortly after disembarkation, the two Roberts families lived on Kent Street in Sydney's Rocks area, but moved to the Braidwood district by November 1835. At this time, John Roberts' request to purchase 100 acres at Boro Creek Swamp "to enable him to erect a warehouse and establishment for the convenience of travellers and acting as a Veterinary Surgeon and Farrier" had been granted.

The land grant referred to was Portion 1 of the Parish of Nadgigomar, County of Argyle; this parcel of land was to the north of the Boro Creek. Today this land is within the boundaries of the Mayfield estate, as defined by the SCA in 2009. John Roberts built the Star and Garter Inn on this land grant in c. 1835. He held the license for the Star and Garter Inn in 1836 and 1837; his brother Robert Roberts was a publican here also.

In March 1836, John Roberts purchased 200 acres of land on the Boro Creek (Portion 43 of the Parish of Larbert) which later became the foundation of Mayfield.

This parcel of land was in the vicinity of "Bora", which was one of three stations marked by Assistant Surveyor Robert Hoddle on his map of the district in 1824. "Bora" is also marked on a 1924 Parish Map of Larbert, on a bend of the Shoalhaven River, just south of where Virginia homestead is located today. This portion of land is no longer part of the Virginia Estate, as defined by the SCA in 2009. It is probable that Bora gave the Boro River and Boro district their names.

Charles James Bullivant had been promised this land, described as 640 acres of land "at Kurraducbidgee", in 1825. At this time it was a "cattle station" which was being run by Mr Faithful, who would later settle at Springfield. There were delays in officially granting the land to Bullivant as the land had not been properly surveyed. In 1827, Bullivant wrote to the Lands Department stating that his grant was 'called "Bora" and [is] at present occupied as a run by Mr Faithful on the north side of the Shoal Haven'.

Bullivant came free on the Ocean in 1816 and was a former officer of the 46th Regiment. Although his correspondence with the Lands Office suggests that he planned to move to his rural seat, he continued to live on Cumberland Street in The Rocks and later moved to North Sydney, where he became the publican at the Rag and Famish Hotel. Bullivant sold his cattle station to John Roberts in c. 1836, in the same year it had been officially granted to him.

In January 1840, Anna Maria Roberts, the abandoned wife of John Roberts, sold 300 acres of land ('being Portion 43 of the Parish of Larbert, 200 acres, and Portion 1 of the Parish of Nadgigomar, 100 acres') to Thomas and Luke Hyland for £500. She and her children remained living at Virginia. The 1841 census records that there were 16 people living at Virginia in this year.

The Virginia homestead is to the west of Mayfield. Virginia is located on part of Portion 44 in the Parish of Larbert, which originally comprised 640 acres to the south of the Boro Creek and to the north of the Shoalhaven River. It appears that this original land grant has been subdivided and that the southernmost portion, which sat on a bend in the Shoalhaven River, is no longer within the boundaries of Virginia as defined by the SCA in 2009. The site of the homestead is shown on a 1924 Parish Map of Larbert.

In March 1836, John Roberts purchased this 640 acre grant from Bullivant for £550 and named the property Virginia Waters. Roberts was officially granted this land on 26 October 1840. By this time, he had left Australia for a new life in New Zealand.

There is some suggestion that there was a flood soon after the Roberts family moved to Virginia in the 1830s and 1840s, and that the bark hut in which they were living was swept away, which drowned two of their small children. However, there is no record of any deaths of children born to John and Anna Roberts in the Births, Deaths and Marriages Register, in this period.

Peter Roberts, born in England in 1823, was the fifth child born to John and Anna Maria Roberts. He married Jane Oakenden at Goulburn in 1862. Peter and Jane Roberts continued to live at Virginia after their marriage, and Peter farmed the property. They had nine children including Peter (b. 1865) and Henry Oakenden Roberts (b. 1872). In 1870, Peter and Jane were flooded out and "he decided to build a new home on higher ground.".

Peter Roberts died at Virginia on 28 June 1890, aged 67 years old. He was survived by his wife Jane, who died on 28 March 1916, when she was 72 years old. Both were buried at the Larbert Cemetery.

A part-time school was operating at Virginia with schools located on nearby pastoral properties: Durran Durra from 1894 to 1896 and Manar from 1896 to 1899. (Department of Education 1993: 144).

The homestead on the Virginia estate was rebuilt in 1915-25 by a member of the Roberts family, possibly Peter Roberts Jnr (b. 1865), who lived at Virginia until he retired to Goulburn. Peter's son Oscar (b. 1900) continued to reside at Virginia "making four generations to reside at Virginia". When Oscar Roberts retired to Braidwood, he sold Virginia to Denzil Sturgiss.

In 1968, the Metropolitan Water Sewerage and Drainage Board proposed a scheme, known as the Shoalhaven Scheme, to supply water to Sydney and the South Coast. The proposed Welcome Reef Dam on the upper Shoalhaven River, in the vicinity of Braidwood, was to be part of the second stage of this scheme.

From 1968 through to the mid-1980s, the Board set about purchasing privately owned pastoral holdings in the area between Braidwood and Goulburn for the proposed Welcome Reef Dam and catchment area, eventually acquiring 37,000 acres. Virginia was resumed by the Government of New South Wales on behalf of the Metropolitan Water Sewerage and Drainage Board at this time.

The estate now defined by the SCA as Virginia only includes land to the south of the Boro Creek. Most of this land remains as bushland, and has only been cleared on the frontage to the Boro Creek. Little Forest Creek runs north–south through the estate.

== Description ==
The original property was settled in the 1840s as Virginia and has historically been one of the more substantial landholdings in the district. The homestead complex is located off Stewarts Crossing Road on a small hill overlooking cleared plains to the river flats of the Shoalhaven River, with rolling hills beyond. The land rises behind the homestead to the north-west, forming a backdrop of natural bushland. The homestead is skirted by large original Monterey pines.

The various structures at Virginia include:

- Homestead (c. 1920s)
- Laundry (mid 19th century)
- Landscaping
- Slab Shed (mid 19th century)
- Garage (late 19th century)
- Staff cottage (c. 1920-30s)
- Outbuildings (chicken sheds, slaughter house and fibro shed)
- Shearing Shed and yards (mid-late 19th century)
- School house (mid-late 19th century)

Homestead (c. 1920s)

The present homestead is a timber framed and weatherboard clad structure that looks to date c. 1920s. It has a hipped and gable roof form clad with corrugated iron, the gable ends being battened with lattice at high level, and two face brick chimneys. There are small verandahs at the north-east and south-east corners which feature alternate wide and narrow timber balustrades and friezes. Windows are a mix of multi paned casement or two-light double hung sash. Exposed rafters are below double v-jointed boarding to the eaves. The base of the house is rough-cast, masonry and reasonably intact overall. Tin vents are located at high levels on the walls.

Within the sub-floor on the eastern side of the house are the remains of a rubble stone wall, which may be the 1870s cottage.

Internally the homestead is in good condition and retains many of its original finishes and features. Walls are battened fibre cement sheeting, and timber boarded to chair rail height. Ceilings are either decorative plaster or battened fibre cement sheeting. The homestead features a number of full height two-light sash windows opening to the front verandah, a servery within the dining space and face brick fireplace surrounds.

At the rear of the house is a later extension that houses a kitchen and meals area.

Former laundry (mid 19th century)

A small timber framed and weatherboard clad structure with gable roof of corrugated iron and concrete slab floor. A sandstock chimney remains at one end. The structure is being undermined by wombat burrows and an adjacent concrete BBQ is in danger of collapsing into the hut.

Landscaping

The location of the homestead is marked by a semi circle of mature radiata pines on the southern and western sides. Around the homestead is a small yard enclosed by a timber and star picket framed wire fence in fair condition. On the slopes in front of the homestead and yard are the remains of an overgrown orchard. Near to the school house is large mature gum tree, which would appear to have been cultivated at an early date.

Slab shed (mid 19th century)

The slab shed is a single roomed structure located at the rear of the homestead, probably dating from the mid 19th century. It has a simple round posts, top and bottom plates, with walls of split vertical slabs, which have been limewashed to both the exterior and interior. The floor is concrete slab, and the roof framing timbers are a mix of hand and machine sawn timbers. The gable roof is clad with corrugated iron sheeting, and the ceiling lined with bituminised builder's paper.

Garage (late 19th century)

A timber framed weatherboard clad building comprising two garage spaces. The building has a gable roof over the one garage and a skillion roof over the other. The floor of the building is a concrete slab. There is an early window at one end of the gable roofed structure.

Staff cottage (c. 1920-30s)

A 1920s-30s cottage is located adjacent the garage. It has weatherboard walls with external brick chimney and corrugated gable iron roof. Rectangular in plan, the cottage contains 4 rooms and a bathroom within an enclosed verandah at one end. Windows are double hung sash dating from the period. Internally all finishes and fixtures from the period of construction remain, including battened fibre cement wall and ceiling linings and brick fireplace surround.

Outbuildings

A number of smaller outbuildings such as chicken sheds and yard of corrugated iron and timber bush poles, a former fibre cement slaughter house and fibre cement shed remain.

Shearing shed and yards (from mid 19th century)

The shearing shed and stables appears to have been constructed in a number of different stages, as evidenced by the mix of gable and skillion roof forms. The original extent of the shearing shed was comparatively quite small, and appears to have occupied the area of the bins. In this area are the remains of hand squared posts, timber slab walls with metal cover strips. Later extensions are of round bush pole construction, with sawn timber roof framing and suspended timber floors, including the area of pens and yards on the southern side. Externally the whole complex is clad with corrugated iron sheeting to roofs and walls, with the exception of one external wall, which is clad with timber slabs. The shearing machinery and the interiors of the shearing shed are intact. The shearing shed adjoins stables which are later, which have a bush pole construction and pens constructed of half logs.

On the eastern side of the shearing shed are yards of timber post and rail construction, which are partially dilapidated and have been reinforced with corrugated iron sheeting.

School house (mid-late 19th century)

Located at the foot of the hill to the south of the homestead, the school house building is a small single-roomed timber slab structure, with partially enclosed leanto on one side. The gable roof and skillion leanto are clad with corrugated iron. The floors of the main room is composed of 6" timber planks fixed to round logs. There are the remains of a brick fireplace on one side, although the chimney has been removed. Internal walls and raked ceilings were once lined with bituminised builder's paper, however some has peeled away, exposing a limewash finish to the vertical slabs. There is one door remaining, which is a timber ledged and sheeted doors, with carpenter rim lock and diamond headed nails.

The leanto is partially enclosed, and there is evidence of a timber slab wall on the northern side. There are the remains of a timber plank floor within the lean-to.

The structure is in a fair condition, despite the partial collapse of the leanto enclosure and floors, and despite some undermining by wombats.

=== Condition ===
The condition of the homestead was reported as generally fair to poor and the outbuildings poor as at 28 June 2007.

The homestead complex as a whole has a high degree of integrity. The property contains a complete set of 1870s to mid-twentieth century buildings in relatively good condition including: main house, laundry, stables, shearing shed and yards, staff accommodation, storage sheds.

The main house has a high degree of integrity although sections of it require urgent maintenance. The house retains almost all of its original early twentieth century features including internal joinery, fixtures and layout with few modern additions. The original 1870s laundry remains structurally intact although it is being seriously undermined by wombats. The shearing shed and stables complex retains an exceptional degree of integrity and retains its overhead shearing frame and timber skirting table. The former school building retains a high degree of integrity but is in poor condition in parts reducing its level of intactness.

All features of the Limekilns Creek race and sluicing complex were intact when McGowan surveyed the site in the 1990s.

== Heritage listing ==
Virginia has State significance as one of the earliest land grants and settlements in the Shoalhaven River area, that is able to demonstrate patterns of land allocation and use in southern NSW over three distinct phases of development from the mid 19th, late 19th and early 20th centuries. The various structures at the property are tangible evidence of these three phases of settlement and farming activities. The strong visual grouping of the homestead, outbuildings, school house, shearing shed complex and mature landscaping has Regional significance as a historic rural setting that is able to evoke 19th and early 20th century pastoral activity in the region, that has remained largely intact since this time.

The site has some association with the Roberts family, early settlers in the district, and although not assessed is likely to have social significance for descendants of the Roberts family.

The structures at Virginia are good representative examples of rural vernacular construction techniques from the mid 19th to early 20th century. The school house is a rare example of such a use in the Braidwood area that has the ability to provide information about early education facilities on rural properties that is not available in documentary sources.

The Limekilns Creek sluicing site has heritage significance as possibly one of the largest hydraulic sluicing complexes on the Shoalhaven River, which together with the associated engineering works, presents tangible evidence of the major alluvial mining activity centred on this part of the Shoalhaven River in the 1870s.

Virginia was listed on the New South Wales State Heritage Register on 18 November 1999 having satisfied the following criteria.

The place is important in demonstrating the course, or pattern, of cultural or natural history in New South Wales.

Virginia has State heritage significance under this criterion. Established in 1836, it was one of the earlier land grants in the Parish of Larbert.

The Limekilns Creek sluicing site has Local heritage significance under this criterion. The site may be associated with Chinese miners, who were active in the region in the 1870s. It was probably the largest hydraulic sluicing complex on the Shoalhaven and together with the associated engineering works the site presents tangible evidence of the major alluvial mining activity centred on this part of the Shoalhaven in the 1870s.

The place has a strong or special association with a person, or group of persons, of importance of cultural or natural history of New South Wales's history.

Virginia has Local heritage significance under this criterion. The site is associated with the Roberts family, who were significant early settlers in the Braidwood region and are still a well known family in the region today.

The place is important in demonstrating aesthetic characteristics and/or a high degree of creative or technical achievement in New South Wales.

Virginia has State heritage significance under this criterion.

The homestead commands impressive views over the alluvial flats of the Shoalhaven River around Connie's Creek. The strong visual grouping of the homestead, outbuildings, school house, shearing shed complex and mature conifers creates a significant pastoral landscape. Its isolation has protected the historic setting of the group and the ability of the place to demonstrate and evoke nineteenth century and early twentieth century pastoral activity in the region.

As a grouping of rural farming structures, the homestead, its outbuildings, the school house and the shearing shed are significant for their ability to demonstrate the phases of development and use of the property since the mid 19th century to the early decades of the 20th century.

While the split timber slab school house has technical significance as a good representative example of such construction from the mid 19th century, it is a rare example of its type (use) that has the ability to provide information about early education facilities on rural properties that is not available in documentary sources.

The place has strong or special association with a particular community or cultural group in New South Wales for social, cultural or spiritual reasons.

The social significance of Virginia has not been formally assessed through community consultation. It appears to have some significance to the local historical society as an early property in the district, which is associated with the Roberts family, one of the significant early families in the district. It may have Local heritage significance for this reason. It is likely to have significance for the Roberts family and other former tenants, but this attachment does not meet the thresholds for significance under this particular criterion.

The place has potential to yield information that will contribute to an understanding of the cultural or natural history of New South Wales.

Virginia has Local heritage significance under this criterion. Archaeological remains and artefact deposits from the 1840s and 1870s homesteads have the potential to add to knowledge about the development of Virginia Waters and changing lifestyles in a large rural holding in southern NSW throughout the nineteenth century.

The Limekilns Creek sluicing site has Local Heritage significance under this criterion. They contain evidence associated with the major alluvial mining activity that occurred around the Shoalhaven in the 1870s. Along with other mining sites in the district, the Limekilns Creek site has the potential to provide information about life and technology on the goldfields that is not available from other sources.

The place possesses uncommon, rare or endangered aspects of the cultural or natural history of New South Wales.

Virginia has State heritage significance under this criterion. The grouping of structures contains evidence of each of the 3 phases of development at the property, from the early to mid decades of the nineteenth century (archaeological remains, school house, shearing shed, former laundry and slab shed), later decades of the 19th century (garage, extension to shearing shed and archaeological ruins of 1870s cottage) and early decades of the 20th century (homestead and staff quarters).

While the timber slab school house utilises construction techniques that are typical of the mid 19th century, it is a rare example of such a structure of this use, that has the ability to provide information about early education facilities on rural properties at this time that is not available in documentary sources.

The Limekilns Creek sluicing site has Local Heritage significance under this criterion. It forms part of the wider Shoalhaven River goldfields and one of a number of significant sites in the region. It is however possibly the largest mechanical sluicing site on the Shoalhaven.

The place is important in demonstrating the principal characteristics of a class of cultural or natural places/environments in New South Wales.

Virginia has State heritage significance under this criterion as a grouping of structures that are good representative examples of rural vernacular construction techniques from the mid 19th to early 20th century.
