= Boro, New South Wales =

Town in New South Wales, Australia

Boro
- Town
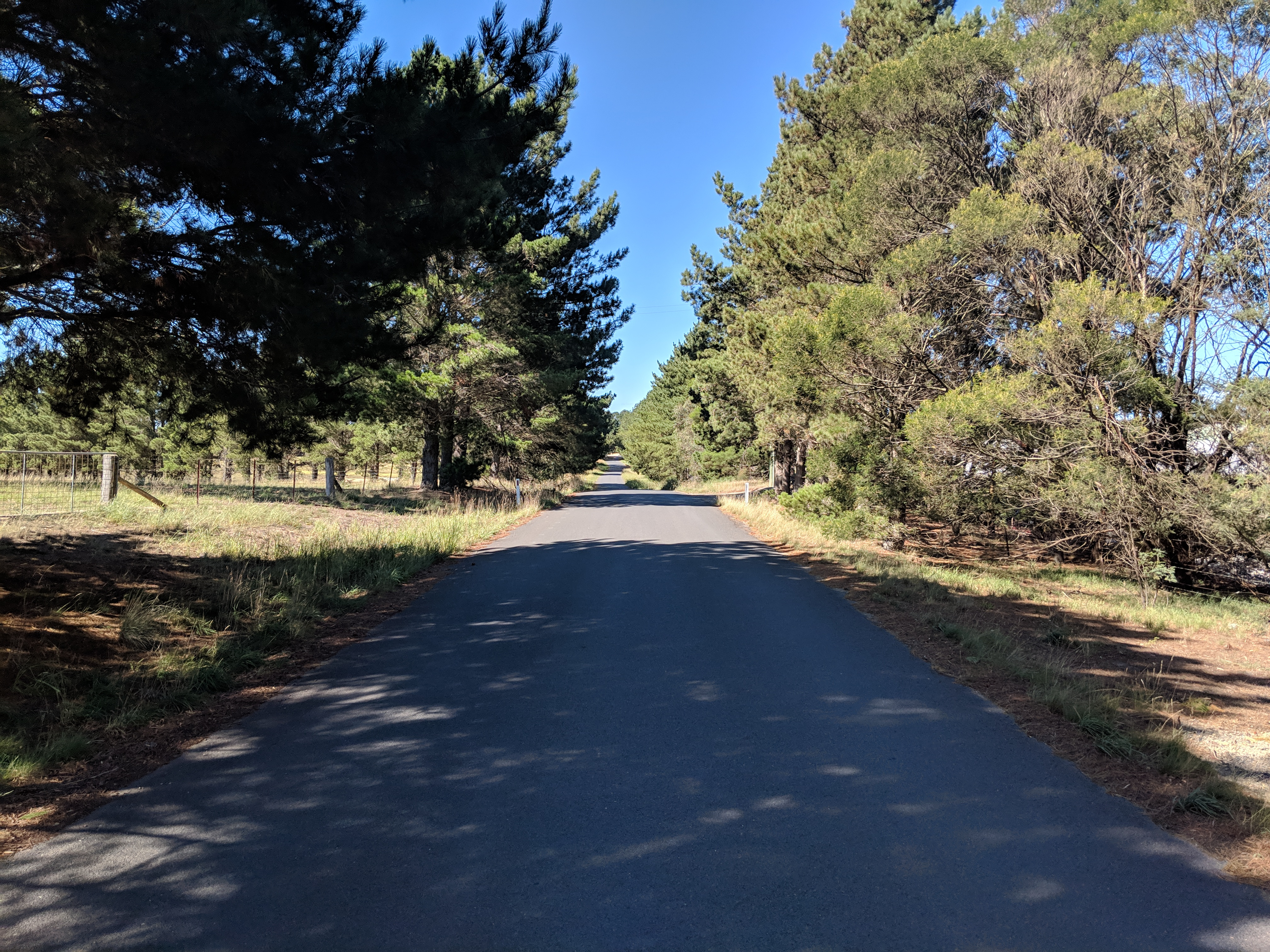

- Coordinates: 35°08′57″S 149°40′02″E
- Country: Australia
- State: New South Wales
- Region: Southern Tablelands
- LGA: Queanbeyan-Palerang Regional Council
- Location: 52 km (32 mi) S of Goulburn; 79 km (49 mi) ENE of Canberra; 54 km (34 mi) E of Queanbeyan; 96 km (60 mi) NW of Batemans Bay; 254 km (158 mi) SW of Sydney

Government
  - State electorate: Monaro
  - Federal division: Eden-Monaro
- Elevation: 659 m (2,162 ft)

Population
  - Total: 97 (2021 census)
- Postcode: 2622
- County: Murray
- Parish: Barnet
Localities around Boro
Tarago	Tarago	Lower Boro
Mount Fairy	Boro	Mayfield
Mulloon	Manar	Larbert

Boro is a rural locality of New South Wales, Australia in the Queanbeyan-Palerang Region, near the village of Tarago, about 50 km south of Goulburn. The name is a variation of the Aboriginal bora ring. At the 2021 census, it had a population of 97.

Boro Creek is a tributary of the Shoalhaven River.

The bushranger, William Westwood, known as "Jackey Jackey", operated in the area.

Silver was mined in the area and there are a number of mining relics and shafts around.
