= Mount Fairy =

- Town
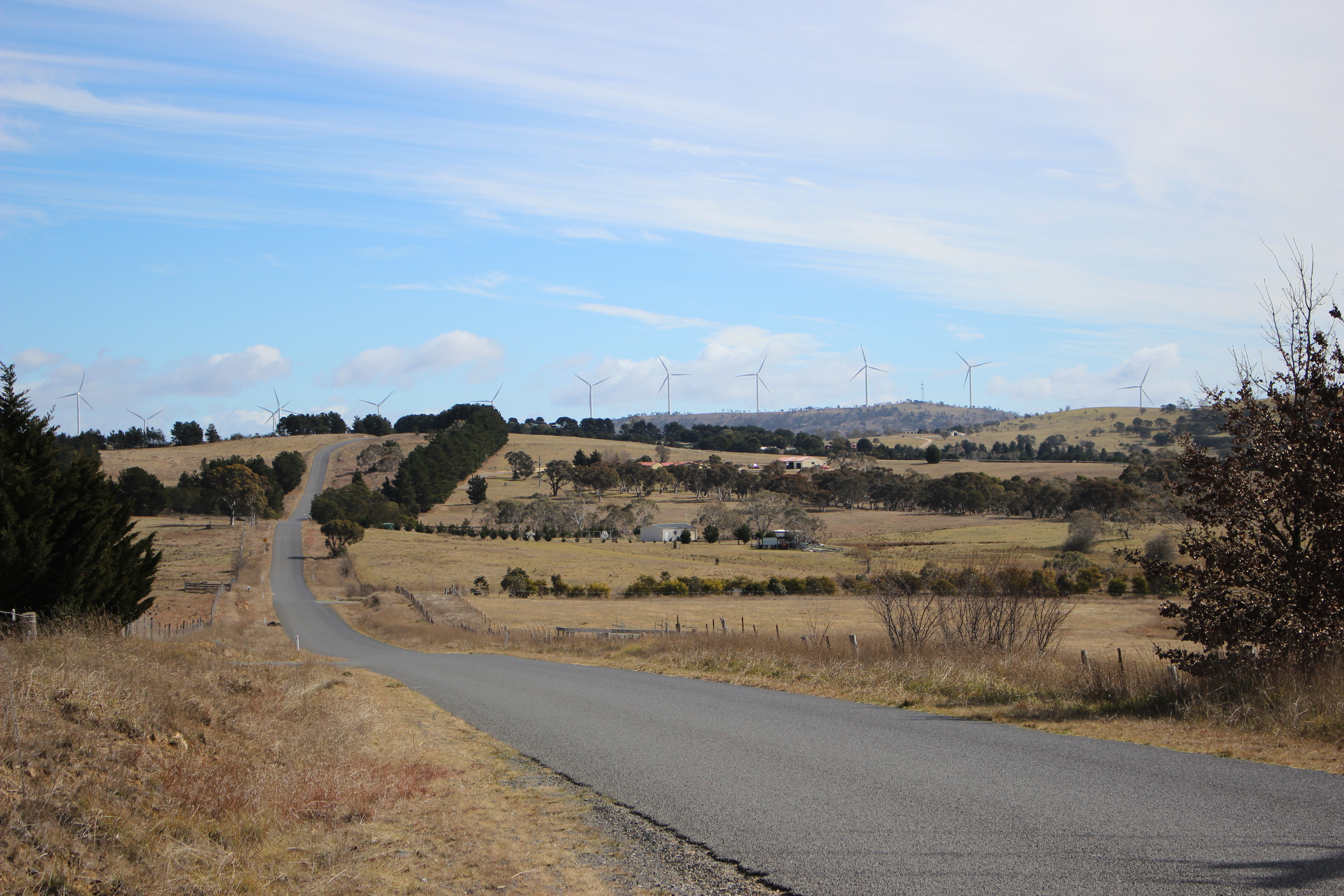
- Mount Fairy, looking towards Capital Wind Farm

- Coordinates: 35°09′57″S 149°35′02″E
- Country: Australia
- State: New South Wales
- Region: Southern Tablelands
- LGA: Queanbeyan-Palerang Regional Council
- Location: 59 km (37 mi) ENE of Canberra; 44 km (27 mi) ENE of Queanbeyan; 57 km (35 mi) S of Goulburn; 110 km (68 mi) NW of Batemans Bay; 257 km (160 mi) SW of Sydney

Government
  - State electorate: Monaro
  - Federal division: Eden-Monaro
- Elevation: 761 m (2,497 ft)

Population
  - Total: 244 (2021 census)
- Postcode: 2580
- County: Murray
- Parish: Merigan, Fairy Meadow
Localities around Mount Fairy
Currawang	Tarago	Tarago
Tarago	Mount Fairy	Boro
Bungendore	Mulloon	Manar

Mount Fairy is a locality in the Queanbeyan–Palerang Regional Council, New South Wales, Australia. It is located to the east of the Bungendore–Tarago road. At the 2021 census, it had a population of 244.

== Railway ==
Mount Fairy had a railway station on the Bombala railway line from 1886 to 1975. Its original name was Fairy Meadow, the name of the parish lying south of Merigan (which includes most of Mount Fairy) in the Mulloon area, but it was renamed to its current name in 1903.

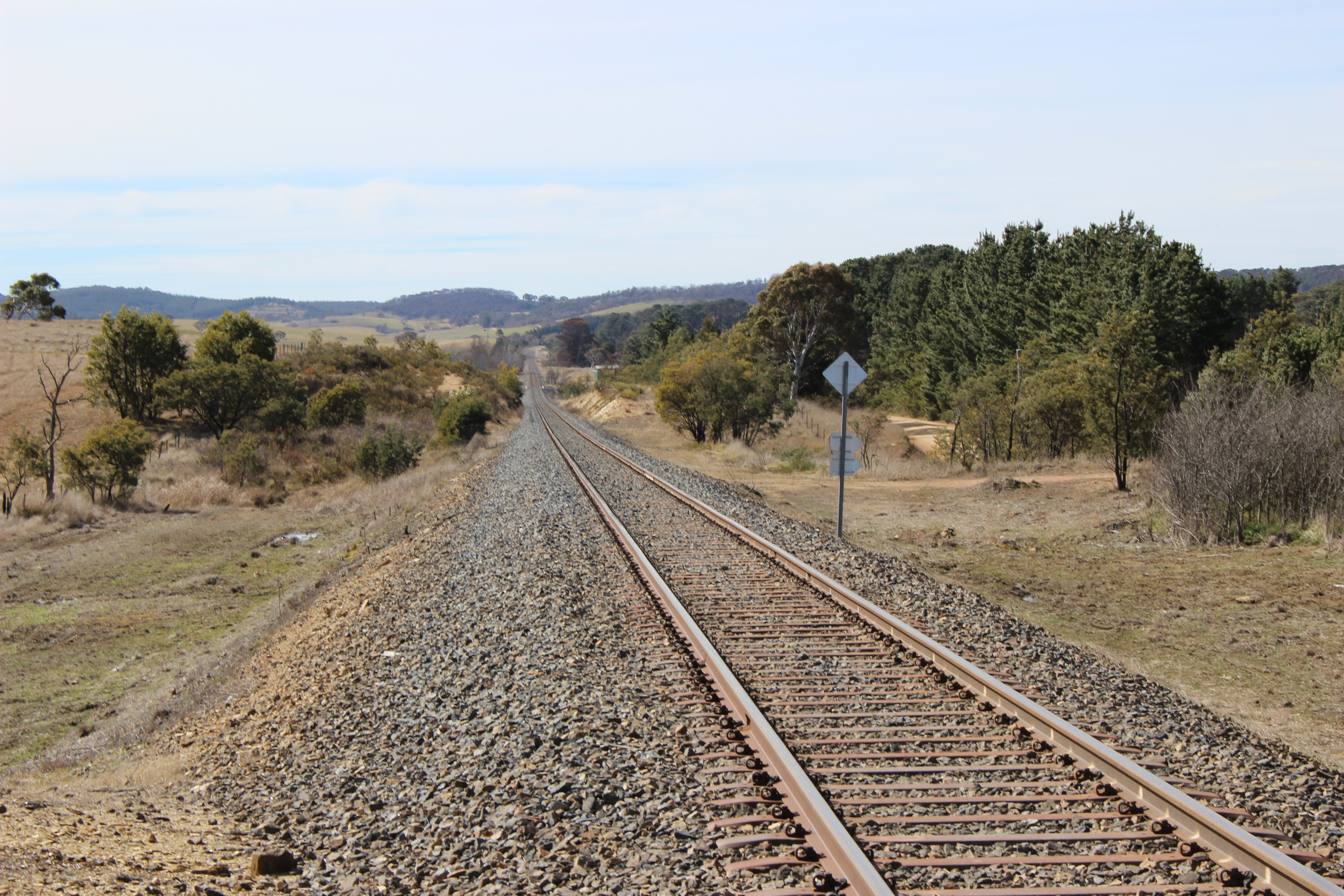
Bombala railway line, looking north to former Mount Fairy railway station

== Industry ==
For many years, Mount Fairy was the site of a quarry, where dolomite was obtained for use in the iron and steel industry at Port Kembla.

== Education ==
Mount Fairy had a state school from 1910 to 1931 and from 1946 to 1951, which generally operated as a "provisional" school, but it was a "half-time" school from 1929 to 1931.
