= Warri, New South Wales =

Warri
- Town
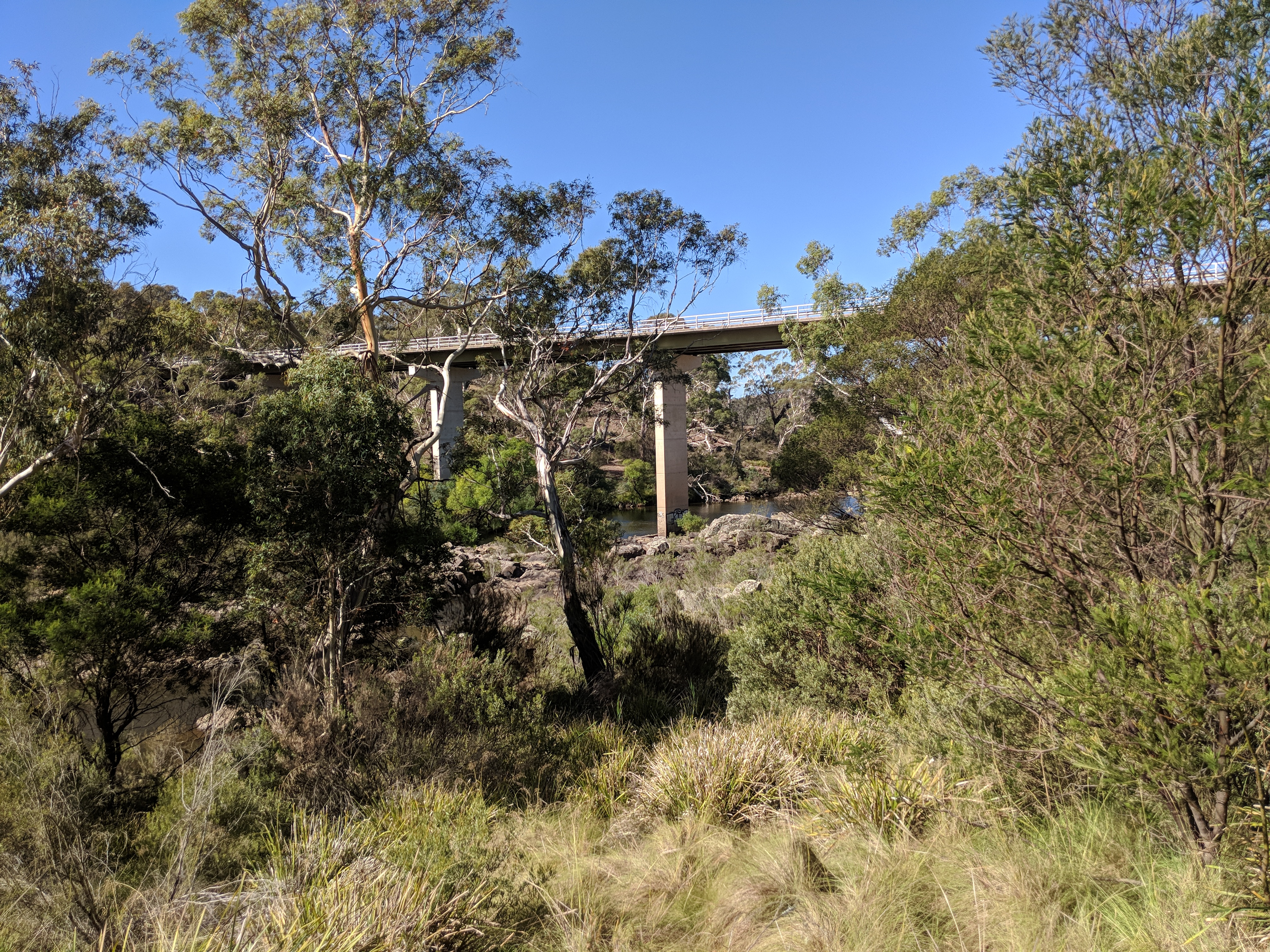
- Warri Bridge over the Shoalhaven

- Coordinates: 35°19′06″S 149°40′11″E
- Country: Australia
- State: New South Wales
- Region: Southern Tablelands
- LGA: Queanbeyan-Palerang Regional Council
- Location: 74 km (46 mi) E of Canberra; 18 km (11 mi) NW of Braidwood; 61 km (38 mi) E of Queanbeyan; 80 km (50 mi) NW of Batemans Bay; 270 km (170 mi) SW of Sydney

Government
  - State electorate: Monaro
  - Federal division: Eden-Monaro
- Elevation: 716 m (2,349 ft)

Population
  - Total: 109 (2016 census)
- Postcode: 2622
- County: Murray
- Parish: Warri
Localities around Warri
Manar	Manar	Mayfield
Mulloon	Warri	Larbert
Palerang	Bombay	Braidwood

Warri is a locality in the Queanbeyan-Palerang Region, Southern Tablelands, New South Wales, Australia. It lies mostly southwest of the Kings Highway between Bungendore and Braidwood and on the north bank of the Shoalhaven River. At the 2016 census, it had a population of 109.
