= Corang =

- Town
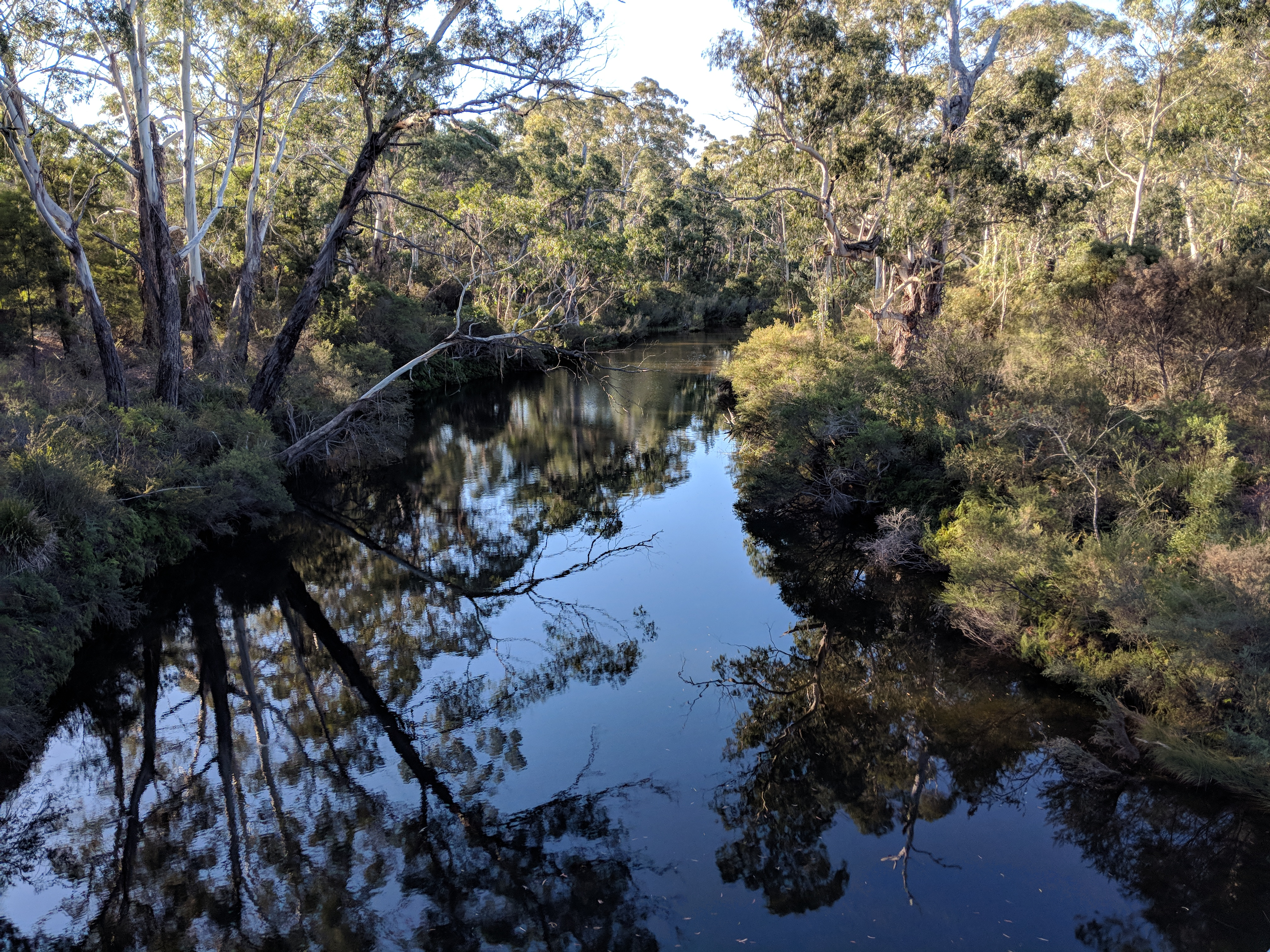
- Corang River looking west with Corang on the right and Oallen on the left

- Coordinates: 35°13′03″S 150°07′42″E
- Country: Australia
- State: New South Wales
- Region: Southern Tablelands
- LGA: Queanbeyan-Palerang Regional Council
- Location: 46 km (29 mi) NE of Braidwood; 75 km (47 mi) SW of Nowra; 75 km (47 mi) SE of Goulburn; 123 km (76 mi) E of Canberra; 242 km (150 mi) SW of Sydney

Government
  - State electorate: Monaro
  - Federal division: Eden-Monaro
- Elevation: 595 m (1,952 ft)

Population
  - Total: 4 (SAL 2021)
- Postcode: 2622
- County: St Vincent
- Parish: Corang
Localities around Corang
Nerriga	Nerriga
Oallen	Corang	Endrick
Oallen	Wog Wog

Corang is a locality in the Queanbeyan–Palerang Regional Council, New South Wales, Australia. It is located on the north side of the Corang River and to the east of the road from Braidwood to Nowra about 46 km north of Braidwood and 75 km southwest of Nowra. At the 2016 census, it had a population of 13. It consists mainly of forest and most of it lies in the Morton National Park. Its eastern boundary runs along the Budawang Range and includes Mount Tarn, Sturgiss Mountain and Quiltys Mountain.

Corang had a "half-time" school from 1868 to 1871.
