= Parish of Jinglemoney =

Civil parish in Australia

Coordinates: 35°25′54″S 149°39′4″E

Jinglemoney Parish is a civil parish of Murray County, New South Wales. It is located around Bombay on Bombay Creek, a tributary of the Shoalhaven River in the Queanbeyan–Palerang Regional Council.
