= Forbes Creek, New South Wales =

Forbes Creek
- Town
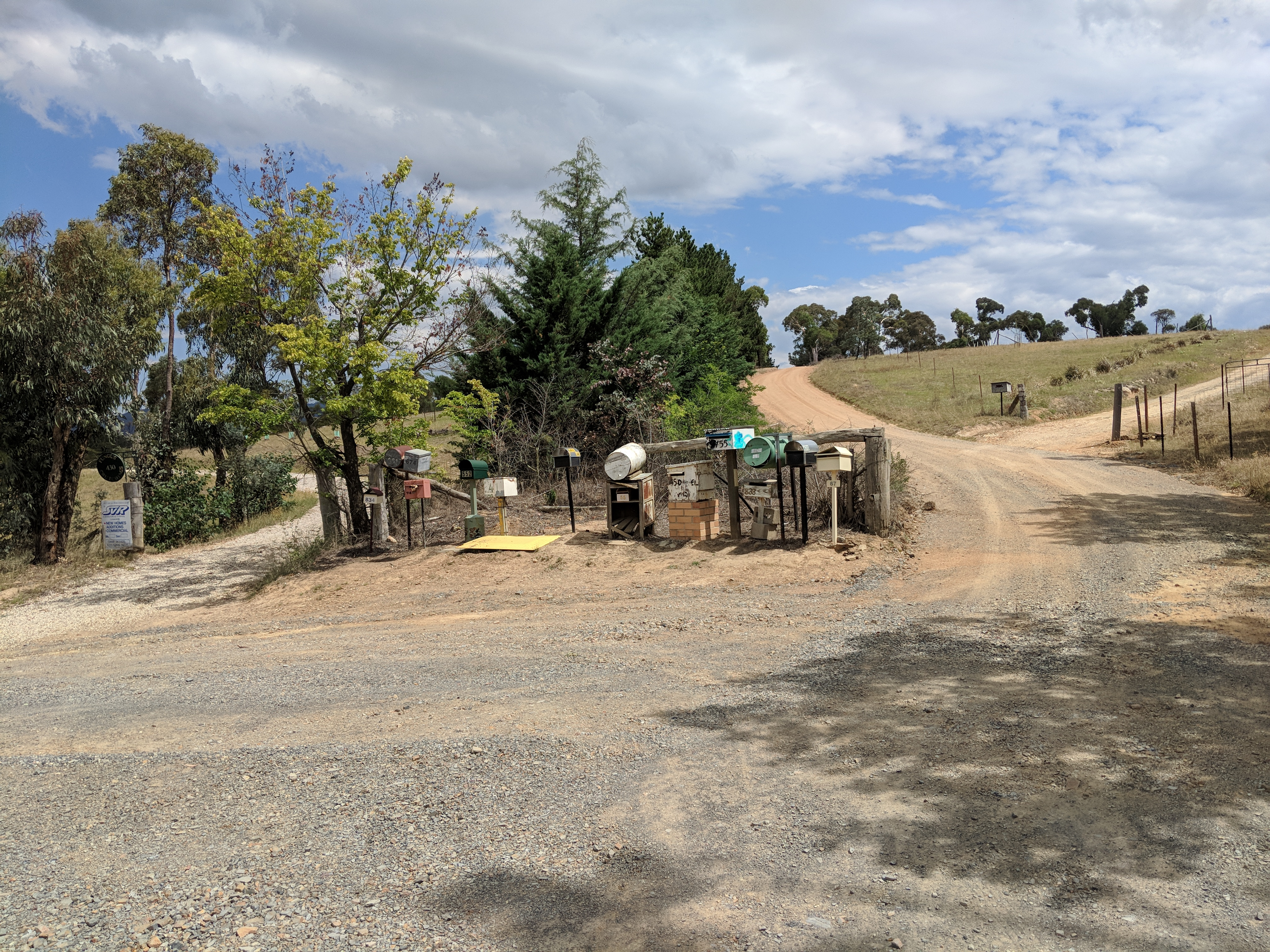

- Coordinates: 35°25′57″S 149°29′02″E
- Country: Australia
- State: New South Wales
- Region: Southern Tablelands
- LGA: Queanbeyan-Palerang Regional Council
- Location: 45 km (28 mi) ESE of Canberra; 31 km (19 mi) E of Queanbeyan; 133 km (83 mi) WNW of Batemans Bay; 300 km (190 mi) SW of Sydney

Government
  - State electorate: Monaro
  - Federal division: Eden-Monaro
- Elevation: 812 m (2,664 ft)

Population
  - Total: 62 (2021 census)
- Postcode: 2621
- County: Murray
- Parish: Molonglo
Localities around Forbes Creek
Bungendore	Bungendore	Mulloon
Hoskinstown	Forbes Creek	Palerang
Rossi	Rossi	Palerang

Forbes Creek is a locality in Queanbeyan-Palerang Regional Council, New South Wales, Australia. The town lies 45 km east of Canberra. At the 2021 census, it had a population of 62. The Tallaganda National Park includes part of its eastern edge.

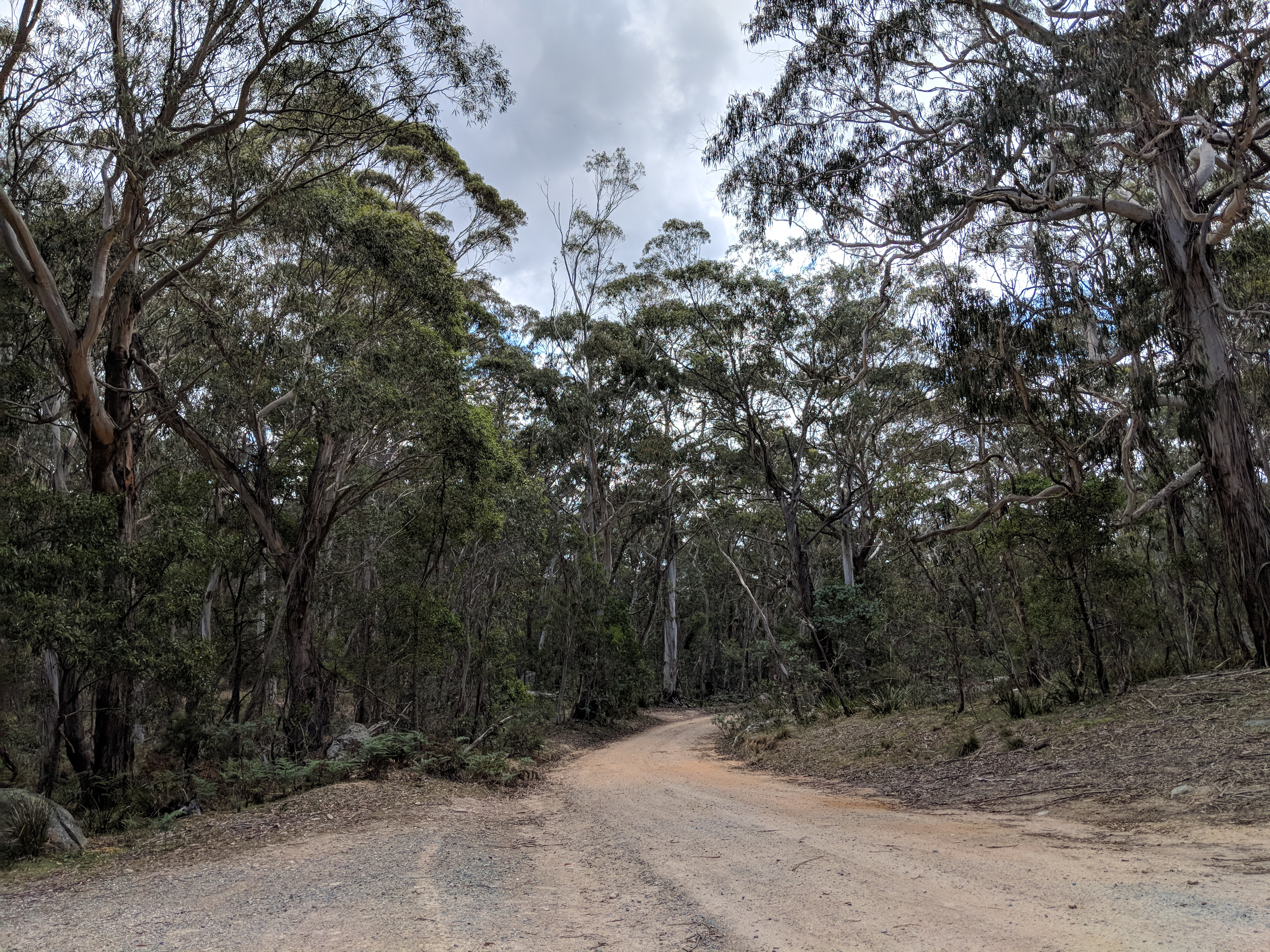
Tallaganda National Park
