= Bombay, New South Wales =

Bombay
- Town
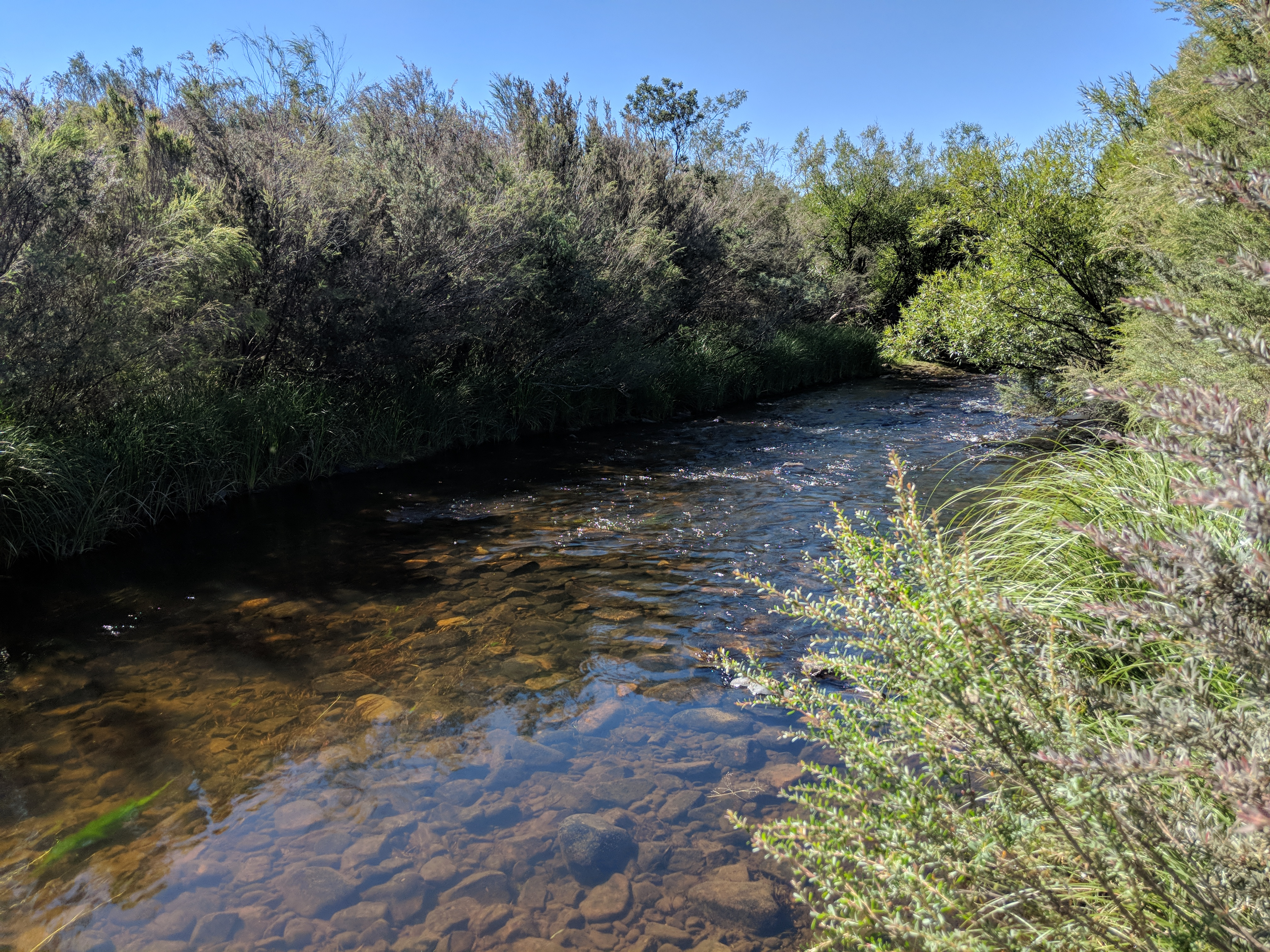
- Shoalhaven River below Bombay Bridge

- Coordinates: 35°25′57″S 149°39′02″E
- Country: Australia
- State: New South Wales
- Region: Southern Tablelands
- LGA: Queanbeyan-Palerang Regional Council
- Location: 14 km (8.7 mi) SW of Braidwood; 99 km (62 mi) ESE of Canberra; 86 km (53 mi) E of Queanbeyan; 73 km (45 mi) WNW of Batemans Bay; 294 km (183 mi) SW of Sydney

Government
  - State electorate: Monaro
  - Federal division: Eden-Monaro
- Elevation: 676 m (2,218 ft)

Population
  - Total: 142 (2021 census)
- Postcode: 2622
- County: Murray
- Parish: Jinglemoney
Localities around Bombay
| Mulloon | Warri | Braidwood |
| Palerang | Bombay | Braidwood |
| Farringdon | Farringdon | Bendoura |

Bombay is a locality in the Queanbeyan–Palerang Regional Council, New South Wales, Australia. It is located about 14 km southwest of Braidwood on the western bank of the Shoalhaven River. At the 2021 census, it had a population of 142. It has two areas of somewhat denser settlement described as "Bombay" (near Bombay creek) and "Little Bombay" (further north and near Little Bombay creek). It had a school in 1871 (when it was called "Little Bombay Half-Time School") and from 1873 to 1928, normally described as "Bombay Half-Time School" but sometimes as "Bombay Provisional School".

== 2019-2020 Bushfires ==
During the 20129-2020 bushfire season, large parts of Bombay and the surrounding areas were heavily affected by fires. Many rare plant species, such as the Bossiaea bombayensis were feared lost, however, the plants remained undamaged.
