= Palerang, New South Wales =

Palerang
- Town
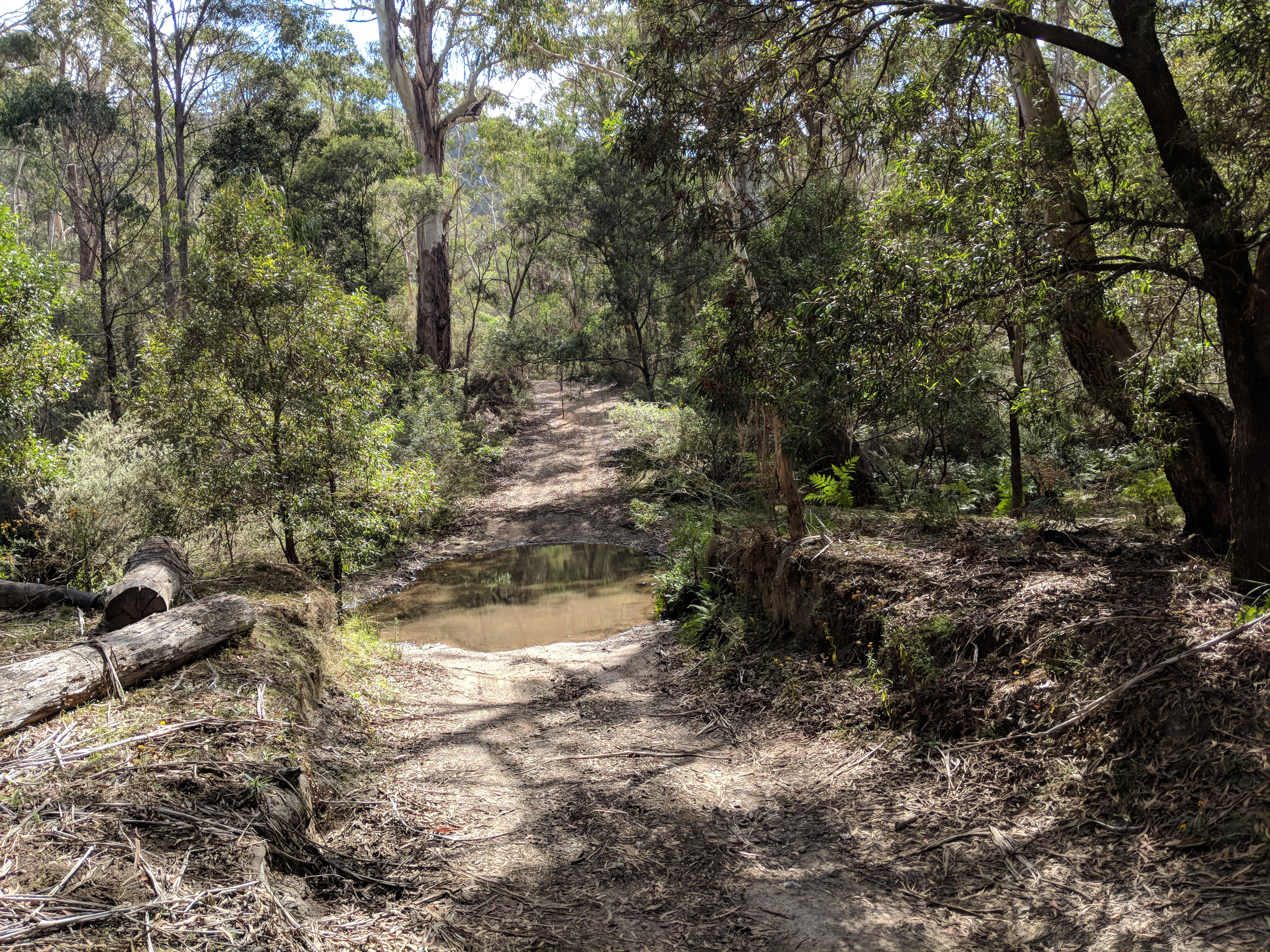
- Tallaganda National Park

- Coordinates: 35°25′26″S 149°34′04″E
- Country: Australia
- State: New South Wales
- Region: Southern Tablelands
- LGA: Queanbeyan-Palerang Regional Council
- Location: 57 km (35 mi) ESE of Canberra; 42 km (26 mi) E of Queanbeyan; 86 km (53 mi) WNW of Batemans Bay; 312 km (194 mi) SW of Sydney

Government
  - State electorate: Monaro
  - Federal division: Eden-Monaro
- Elevation: 844 m (2,769 ft)

Population
  - Total: 0 (2016 census)
- Postcode: 2621
- County: Murray
- Parish: Palerang
Localities around Palerang
Bungendore	Mulloon	Warri
Forbes Creek	Palerang	Bombay
Rossi	Farringdon	Harolds Cross

Palerang is a locality in Queanbeyan-Palerang Regional Council, New South Wales, Australia. The town lies 55 km east of Canberra on the Palerang range. At the 2016 census, it had a population of none. It includes part of the Tallaganda National Park and State Conservation Area.
