= Harolds Cross, New South Wales =

Harolds Cross
- Town
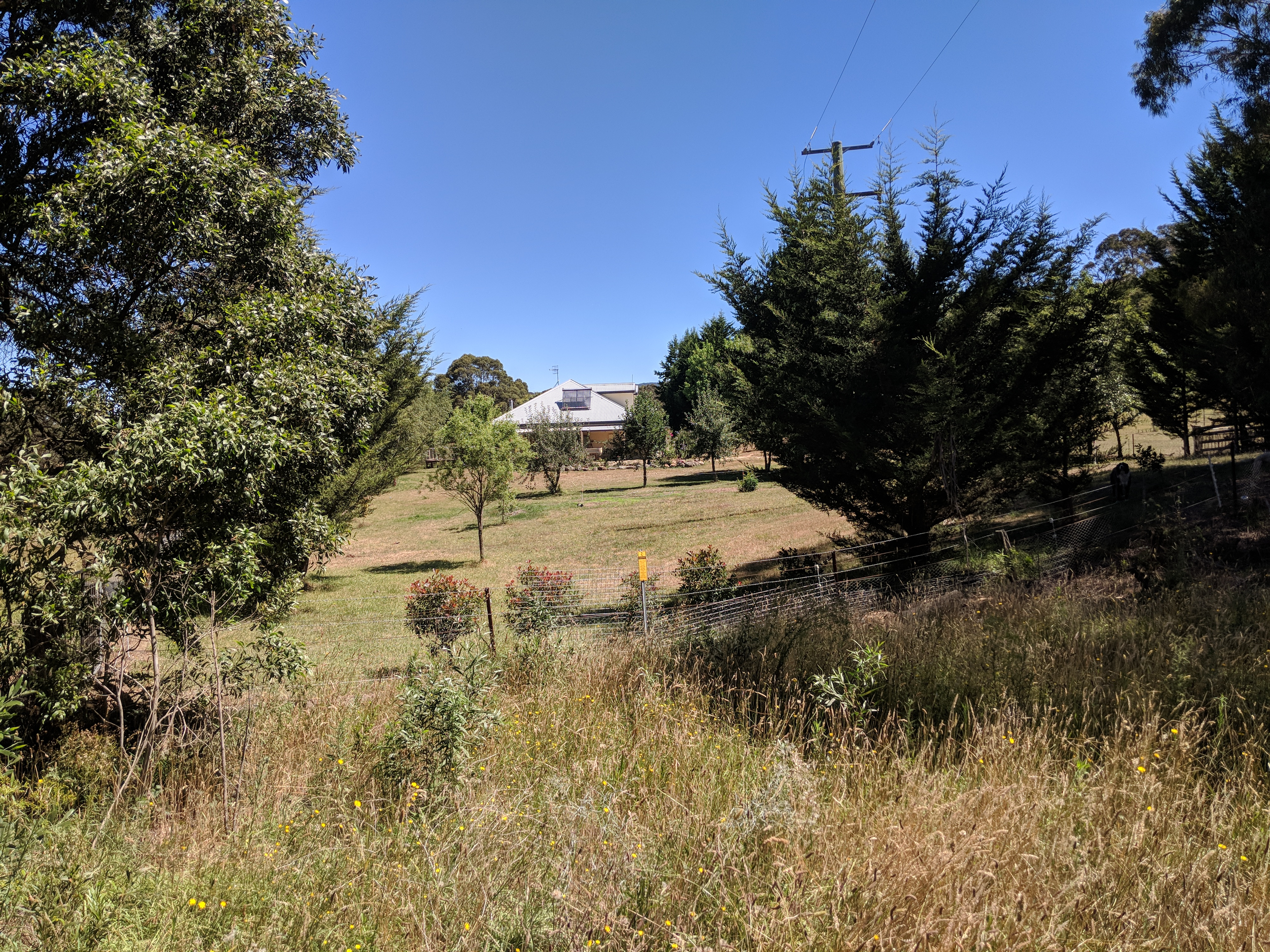

- Coordinates: 35°34′35″S 149°33′29″E
- Country: Australia
- State: New South Wales
- Region: Southern Tablelands
- LGA: Queanbeyan-Palerang Regional Council
- Location: 35 km (22 mi) SW of Braidwood; 75 km (47 mi) SE of Canberra; 11 km (6.8 mi) NE of Captains Flat; 52 km (32 mi) SE of Queanbeyan; 316 km (196 mi) SW of Sydney

Government
  - State electorate: Monaro
  - Federal division: Eden-Monaro
- Elevation: 1,017 m (3,337 ft)

Population
  - Total: 79 (2021 census)
- Postcode: 2622
- County: Murray
- Parish: Jinero
Localities around Harolds Cross
Rossi	Palerang	Farringdon
Captains Flat	Harolds Cross	Bendoura
Jingera	Kindervale	Ballalaba

Harolds Cross is a locality in the Queanbeyan–Palerang Regional Council, New South Wales, Australia. It is located about 11 km northeast of Captains Flat and 35 km southwest of Braidwood. At the 2021 census, it had a population of 79. It had a "half-time" school from 1868 and 1915; from 1949 to 1957, it operated as a "provisional school".
