= Farringdon, New South Wales =

Farringdon
- Town
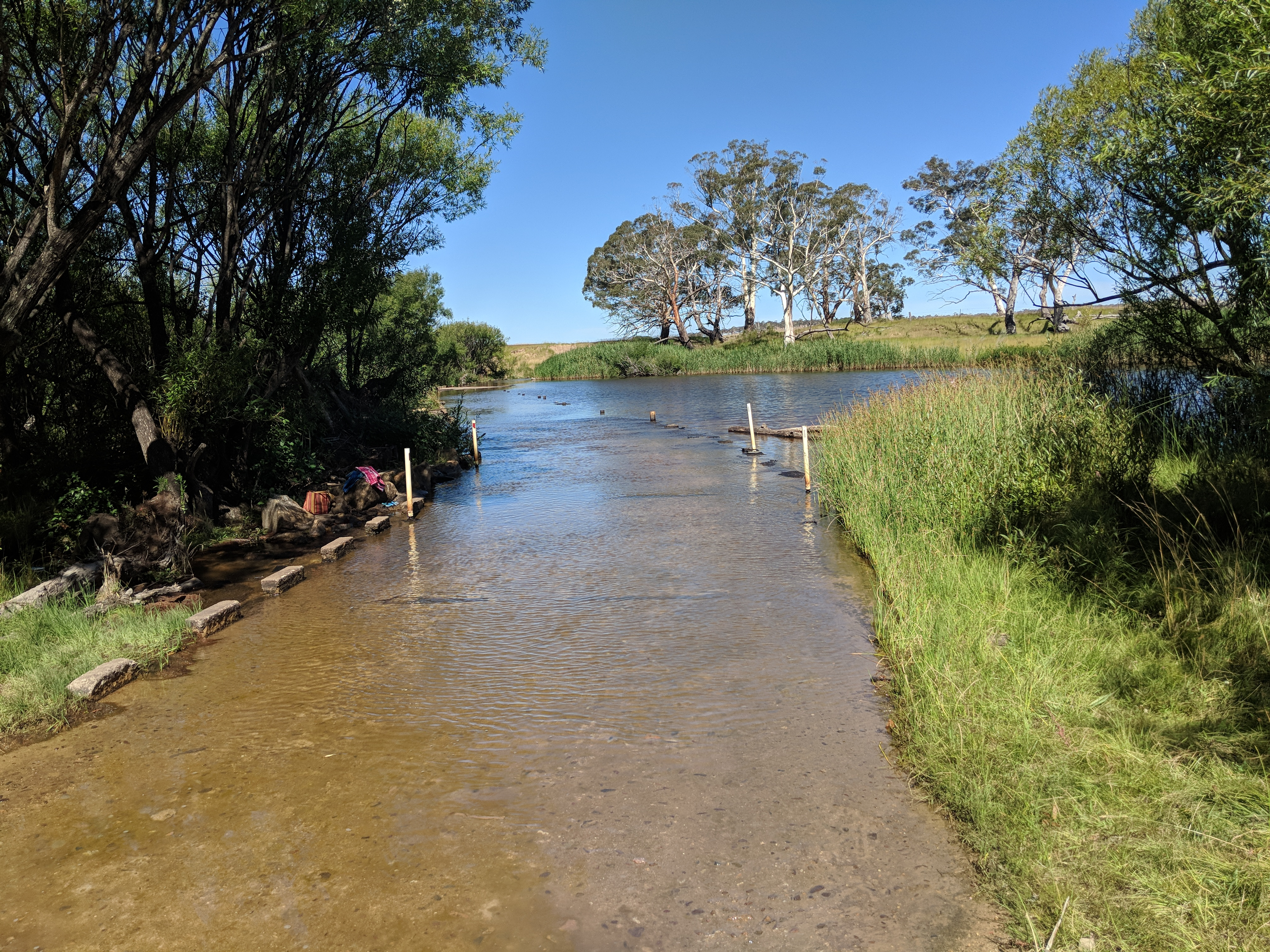
- Farringdon Crossing over the Shoalhaven River

- Coordinates: 35°30′57″S 149°40′02″E
- Country: Australia
- State: New South Wales
- Region: Southern Tablelands
- LGA: Queanbeyan-Palerang Regional Council
- Location: 17 km (11 mi) SW of Braidwood; 106 km (66 mi) SE of Canberra; 92 km (57 mi) SE of Queanbeyan; 79 km (49 mi) W of Batemans Bay; 301 km (187 mi) SW of Sydney

Government
  - State electorate: Monaro
  - Federal division: Eden-Monaro
- Elevation: 672 m (2,205 ft)

Population
  - Total: 21 (2021 census)
- Postcode: 2622
- County: Murray
- Parish: Jinero
Localities around Farringdon
Palerang	Bombay	Braidwood
Rossi	Farringdon	Bendoura
Harolds Cross	Harolds Cross	Bendoura

Farringdon is a locality in the Queanbeyan–Palerang Regional Council, New South Wales, Australia. It is located about 17 km southwest of Braidwood on the western bank of the Shoalhaven River. At the 2021 census, it had a population of 21.

The area now known as Farringdon lies on the traditional lands of Walbanga people, a group of Yuin. It was known by early settlers originally as Jinero or Jineroo, a settler rendering of an Aboriginal word. After settler colonisation, the area lay within the Nineteen Counties that were opened to settlement. The name, 'Farringdon' is from an early land grant known as 'Farringdon Park' or just 'Farringdon'. It was by such early land grants that the land in the area was taken from the Walbanga, and what would later be known as native title was extinguished.

Major William Sandys Elrington took up a land grant, known as 'Mount Elrington', in 1827. Elrington had a 29-year military career, including service in the Peninsula War, before selling his commission and migrating to Australia. Elrington sold his land and left Australia for good, in 1846.

His former home, still known as 'Mount Elrington', is renowned for its historic garden. The garden was begun by Elrington, who brought many of the trees and shrubs from England. Elrington worked his land using convict labour, and his old home retained its small prison, complete with leg irons, until the early 1920s.

Farringdon had a "half-time" school from 1867 to 1894.
