= Corang River =

Coordinates: 35°08′S 150°02′E

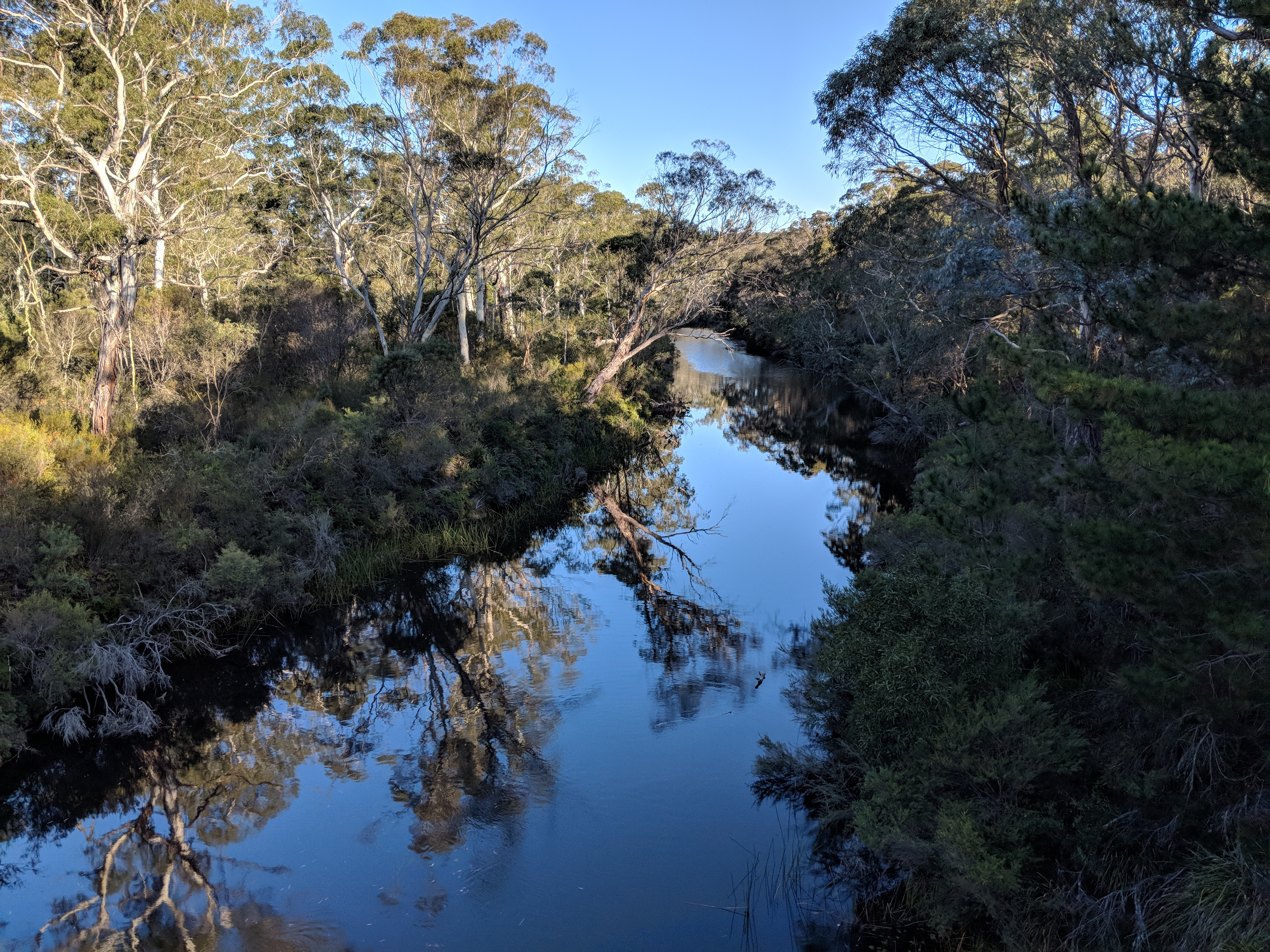
- Corang River at Wog Wog looking east

Location
- Country: Australia
- State: New South Wales
- Region: Sydney Basin (IBRA), Southern Tablelands
- Local government area: Queanbeyan–Palerang

Physical characteristics
- Source: Budawang Range
  - elevation: 720 m (2,360 ft)
- Mouth: Shoalhaven River
  - location: north of Corang
  - elevation: 511 m (1,677 ft)
- Length: 23 km (14 mi)

Basin features
- River system: Shoalhaven River
- Tributaries
  - left: Jerricknorra Creek
  - right: Smilers Creek, Gallaghars Creek, Corang Creek, Nadgengutta Creek
- National park: Budawang

Corang River is a perennial river of the Shoalhaven catchment located in the Southern Tablelands region of New South Wales, Australia.

== Location and features ==
Corang River rises on the western slopes of the Budawang Range and flows generally northwest, joined by five minor tributaries, before reaching its confluence with the Shoalhaven River at Cardies Point, north of Corang, descending 209 metres (686 ft) over its 23 kilometres (14 mi) course.

== See also ==
- List of rivers of Australia § New South Wales
- List of rivers of New South Wales (A–K)
- Rivers of New South Wales
