= Wog Wog =

- Town
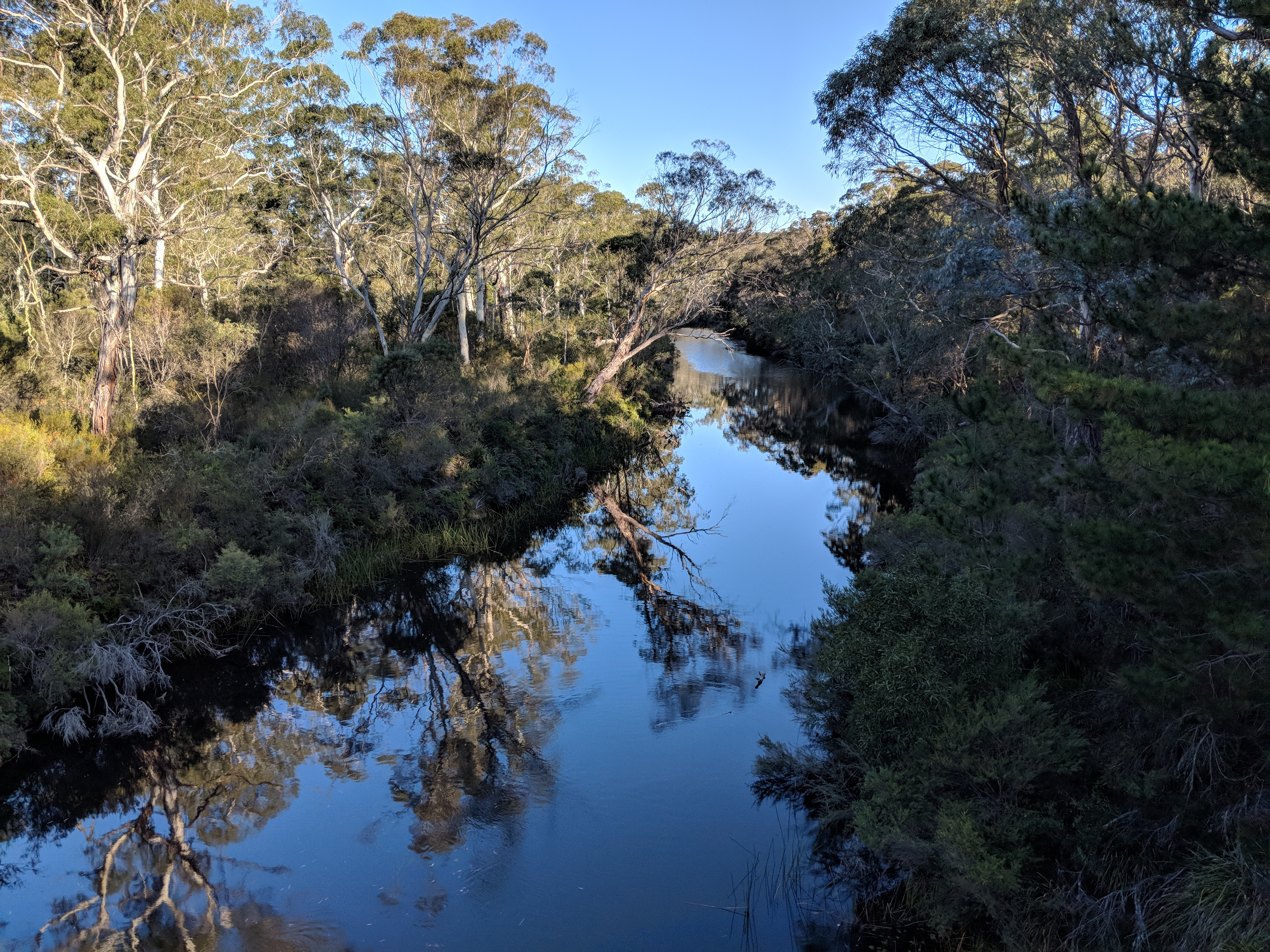
- Corang River looking east with Wog Wog on the right and Corang on the left

- Coordinates: 35°15′56″S 150°03′04″E
- Country: Australia
- State: New South Wales
- Region: Southern Tablelands
- LGA: Queanbeyan-Palerang Regional Council
- Location: 34 km (21 mi) NE of Braidwood; 96 km (60 mi) SW of Nowra; 91 km (57 mi) SE of Goulburn; 126 km (78 mi) E of Canberra; 258 km (160 mi) SSW of Sydney

Government
  - State electorate: Monaro
  - Federal division: Eden-Monaro
- Elevation: 642 m (2,106 ft)

Population
  - Total: 15 (2021 census)
- Postcode: 2622
- County: St Vincent
- Parish: Wog Wog
Localities around Wog Wog
Oallen	Oallen	Corang
Oallen	Wog Wog	Corang
Tomboye	Charleys Forest	Budawang

Wog Wog is a locality in the Queanbeyan–Palerang Regional Council, New South Wales, Australia. It is located on the south side of the Corang River and to the east of the road from Braidwood to Nowra about 34 km north of Braidwood and 96 km southwest of Nowra. At the 2021 census, it had a population of 15. It consists mainly of forest, including parts of the Morton National Park. Its eastern boundary runs along the Budawang Range and includes Wog Wog Mountain and Corang Peak.
