= Parish of Merigan =

Civil parish of Murray County in New South Wales, Australia

Coordinates: 35°07′57″S 149°37′02″E

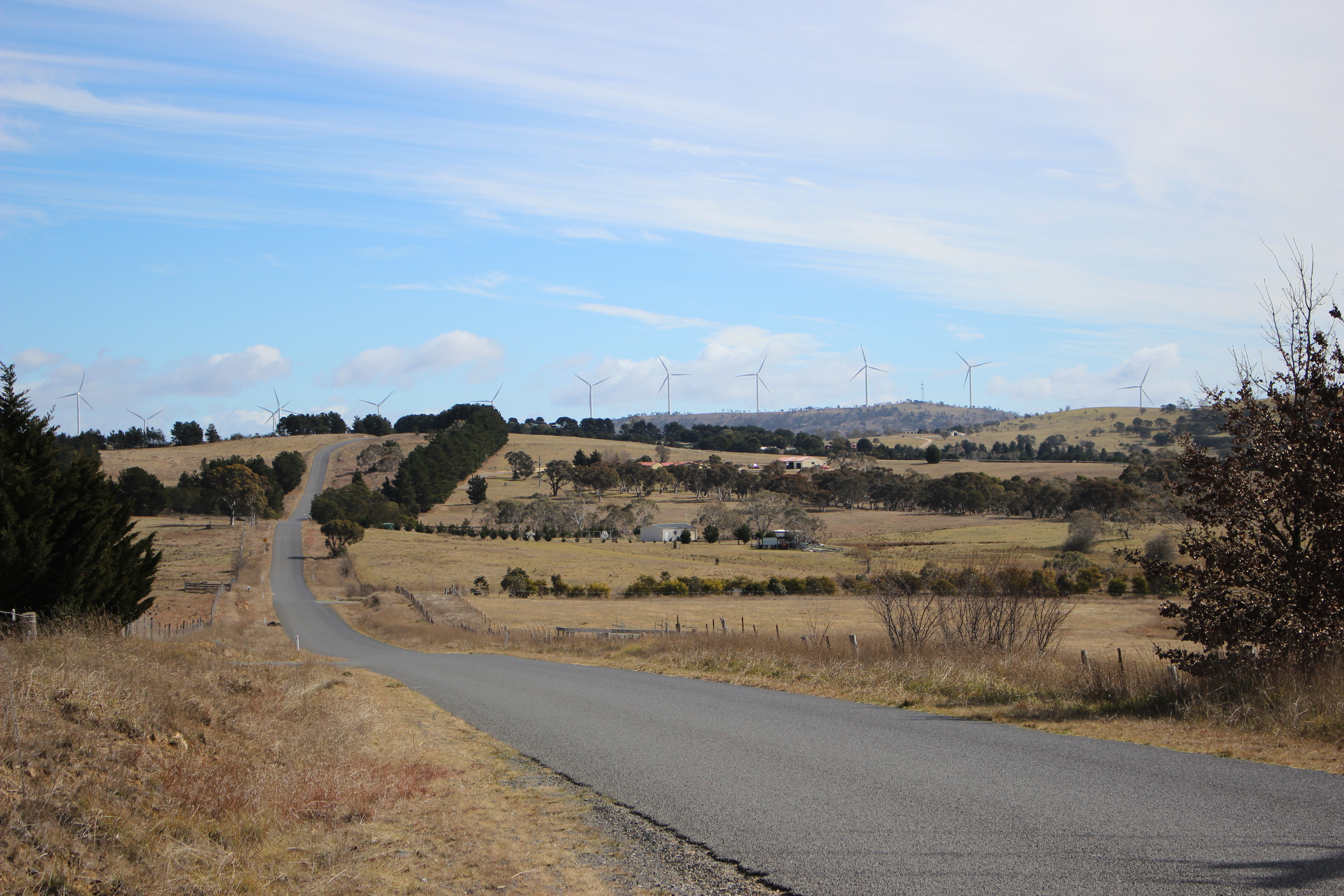
Mount Fairy, looking towards Capital Wind Farm

Merigan, New South Wales is a civil parish of Murray County, New South Wales.

The parish is on the Mulwaree River a few miles south of Tarago. It lies on the Bombala railway line and includes most of the locality of Mount Fairy.
