= Mayfield, Lower Boro =

Mayfield
- Location within New South Wales Location within Australia
- 35.2018°S 149.7921°E
- Location: Mayfield Road, Lower Boro, Queanbeyan-Palerang Region, New South Wales, Australia

Site notes
- Owner: Water NSW

New South Wales Heritage Register
- Official name: Mayfield; Mayfield Homestead - Welcome Reef Dam
- Type: state heritage (complex / group)
- Designated: 18 November 1999
- Reference no.: 1365
- Type: Homestead Complex
- Category: Farming and Grazing

Mayfield is a heritage-listed homestead complex at Mayfield Road, Lower Boro, Queanbeyan-Palerang Region, New South Wales, Australia. It was added to the New South Wales State Heritage Register on 18 November 1999.

== History ==
Verbal advice states that the property was originally owned by Harry Jenner and Sons of Mayfield Tarago Pty Ltd. The present tenant advised that the original homestead was built in the 1860s and burnt down in 1932.

The homestead dates from 1927. The original shearing shed, slab stables and slab dairy date from c. 1860s. Various other outbuildings date from c. 1920s. Archaeological remains at the site date as far back as the 1820s.

Mayfield was acquired by the Metropolitan Water Sewerage and Drainage Board c. 1985 for the ill-fated Welcome Reef Dam project.

== Description ==
The homestead is a weatherboard building, virtually in original condition. Brick rough cast piers with two solid timber posts support the original verandah beam. The roof is corrugated iron with iron guttering. The gable end to the main entry is battened with exposed rafters and sawn timber shingles in original condition. The front door is multipaned with Egyptian-type architraves which also surrounds original casement windows. Outbuildings are numerous, generally of timber and corrugated iron. A long drive leads to what could have been an earlier carriage loop surrounded by early plantings. Large, probably original pines denote the proximity of the homestead. Original 1920s weatherboard garages are located at the side of the homestead. Corrugated iron water tanks and also a fibreglass water tank provide water to the house. The estate is one of the largest in the area of the dam-site. An early slab hut is located adjacent to the original shearing shed, possibly to store farm equipment. There are two later cottages adjoining the shearing shed. A further weatherboard 1920's house is located adjacent to the original slab shed. Early tractor and shearing equipment is inside the shed. On a remote section of the property, granite ruins adjoin a dead tree.

=== Modifications and dates ===
Most items are in good condition with the exception of the shearing and slab sheds which are poor.

== Heritage listing ==
On preliminary visual investigation, Mayfield has a medium level of cultural landscape significance, containing cultural components which evidence past land use practices. These include the original shearing shed and holding pens, the original slab shed, remnant farm machinery, and other elements within the rural landscape such as plough lines and stock circulation tracks. The present homestead is historically valuable as an integral and intact component of the farm building complex, which includes sheds and worker cottages. Potential archaeological remains have been identified, which include granite building relics and fences.

Mayfield was listed on the New South Wales State Heritage Register on 18 November 1999 having satisfied the following criteria.

The place possesses uncommon, rare or endangered aspects of the cultural or natural history of New South Wales.

This item is assessed as aesthetically rare regionally. This item is assessed as historically rare statewide.

The place is important in demonstrating the principal characteristics of a class of cultural or natural places/environments in New South Wales.

This item is assessed as scientifically representative statewide.
