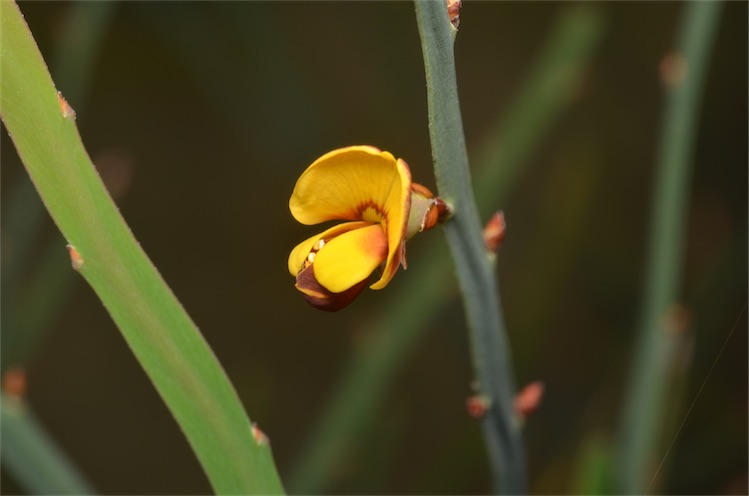

Scientific classification
- Kingdom: Plantae
- Clade: Tracheophytes
- Clade: Angiosperms
- Clade: Eudicots
- Clade: Rosids
- Order: Fabales
- Family: Fabaceae
- Subfamily: Faboideae
- Genus: Bossiaea
- Species: B. bombayensis

Binomial name
- Bossiaea bombayensis K.L.McDougall

= Bossiaea bombayensis =

Bombay bossiaea

Species of flowering plant

Bossiaea bombayensis, commonly known as bombay bossiaea, is a species of flowering plant in the family Fabaceae and is endemic to a small area of New South Wales. It is an erect shrub with flattened cladodes, small, scale-like leaves, and pea-like yellow to red flowers.

== Description ==
Bossiaea bombayensis is an erect shrub that typically grows up to 1.5 m (4 ft 11 in) high with flattened cladodes 2–5 mm (0.079–0.197 in) wide, and that forms rhizomes. The leaves are reduced to reddish-brown scales, 1.3–2 mm (0.051–0.079 in) long. The flowers are borne on pedicels 1.5–3 mm (0.059–0.118 in) long and have four or six brown scales 1–2 mm (0.039–0.079 in) long at the base. The five sepals are 3.5–4.5 mm (0.14–0.18 in) long and joined at the base forming a tube, the two upper lobes 1.0–1.5 mm (0.039–0.059 in) long and the lower three lobes about 1.5–2.0 mm (0.059–0.079 in) long. There are also bracteoles 2.5–3.2 mm (0.098–0.126 in) long but that fall off before the flower opens. The standard petal is yellow with a red base and 6.5–8.0 mm (0.26–0.31 in) long, the wings yellow with a brownish red base and about 2.5 mm (0.098 in) wide and the keel is pale pink to red and 3.5 mm (0.14 in) wide. Flowering occurs in September and October and the fruit is a narrow oblong pod 20–30 mm (0.79–1.18 in) long.

== Taxonomy and naming ==
Bossiaea bombayensis was first formally described in 2009 by Keith Leonard McDougall in the journal Telopea from specimens collected near the Shoalhaven River near Bombay.

== Distribution and habitat ==
Bombay bossiaea grows in shrubland on steep rocky slopes between Warri and Bombay near Braidwood on the Southern Tablelands of New South Wales.

== Conservation status ==
This bossiaeae is listed as critically endangered under the New South Wales Government Biodiversity Conservation Act 2016.
