= Rossi, New South Wales =

Rossi
- Town
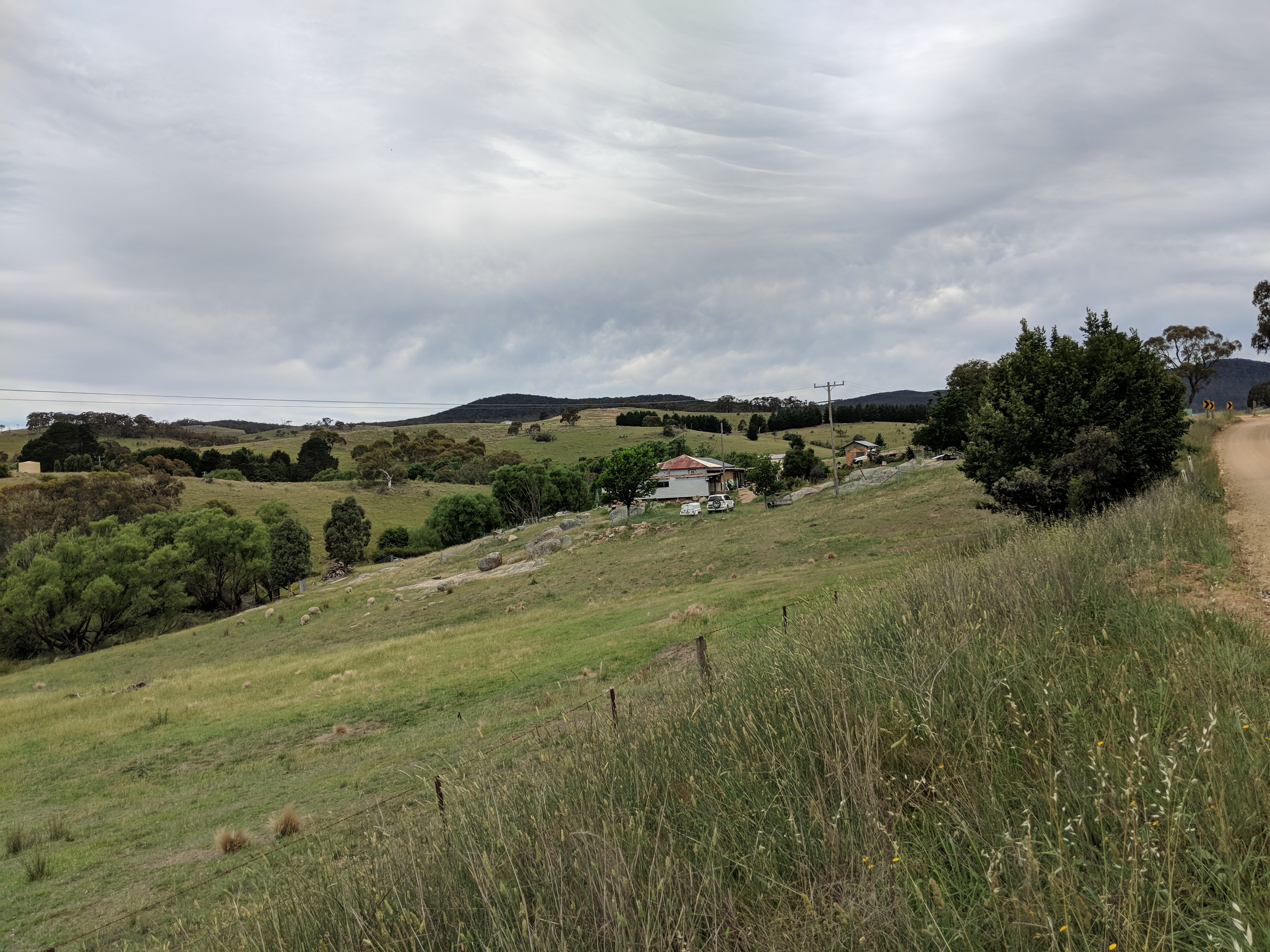

- Coordinates: 35°27′57″S 149°30′02″E
- Country: Australia
- State: New South Wales
- Region: Southern Tablelands
- LGA: Queanbeyan-Palerang Regional Council
- Location: 33 km (21 mi) ESE of Queanbeyan; 47 km (29 mi) ESE of Canberra; 25 km (16 mi) N of Captains Flat; 110 km (68 mi) WNW of Batemans Bay; 306 km (190 mi) SW of Sydney

Government
  - State electorate: Monaro
  - Federal division: Eden-Monaro
- Elevation: 879 m (2,884 ft)

Population
  - Total: 117 (SAL 2021)
- Postcode: 2621
- County: Murray
- Parish: Thurralilly
Localities around Rossi
| Hoskinstown | Forbes Creek | Palerang |
| Captains Flat | Rossi | Farringdon |
| Captains Flat | Captains Flat | Harolds Cross |

Rossi is a locality in the Queanbeyan–Palerang Regional Council, New South Wales, Australia. It is located about 33 km southeast of Queanbeyan and 25 km north of Captains Flat. At the 2021 census, it had a population of 117.
