= Mayfield, New South Wales (Queanbeyan–Palerang) =

Mayfield
- Town
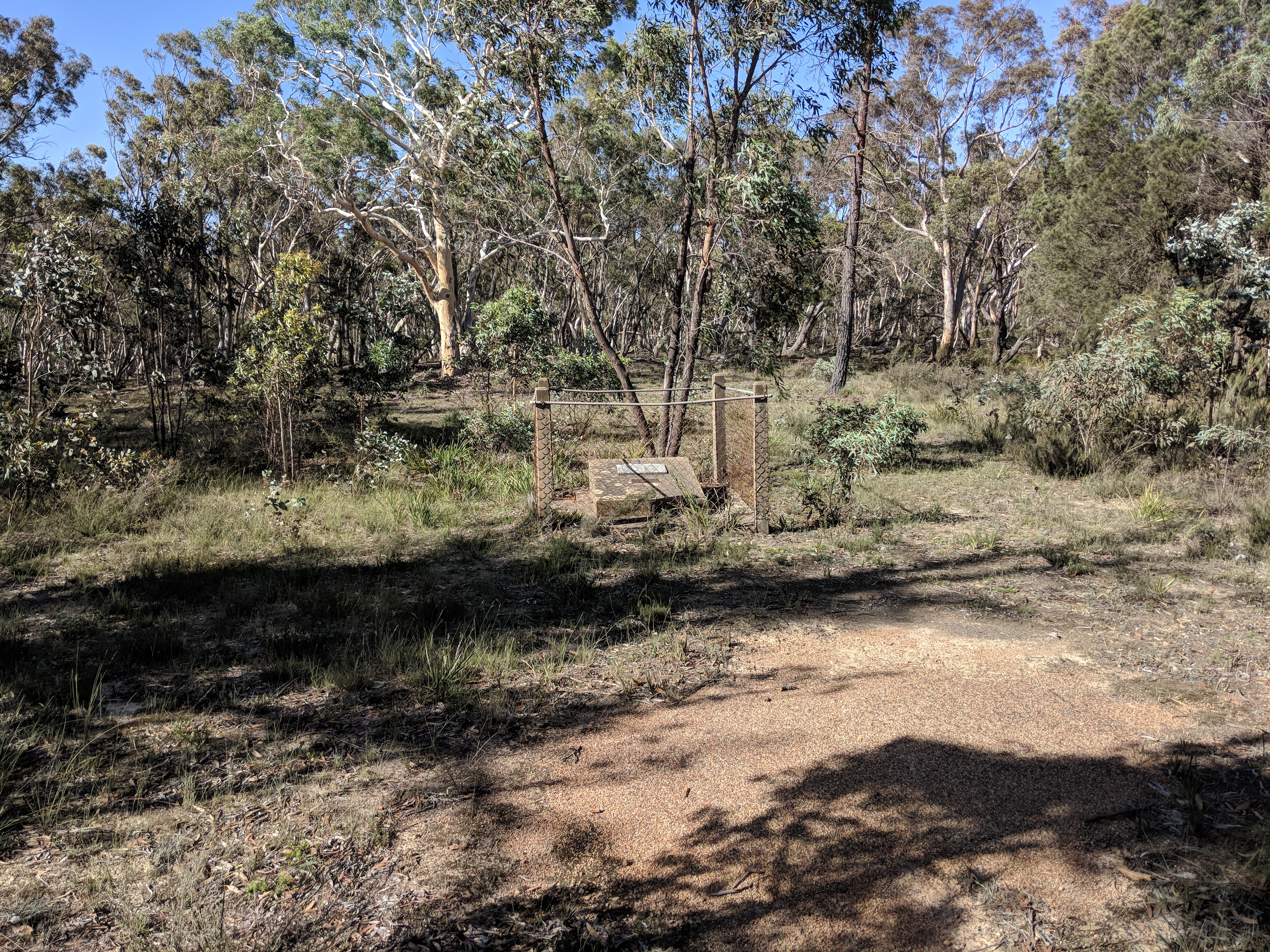
- Site of St Luke's Church of England

- Coordinates: 35°13′57″S 149°46′52″E
- Country: Australia
- State: New South Wales
- Region: Southern Tablelands
- LGA: Queanbeyan-Palerang Regional Council
- Location: 85 km (53 mi) E of Canberra; 58 km (36 mi) S of Goulburn; 113 km (70 mi) W of Nowra; 231 km (144 mi) SW of Sydney

Government
  - State electorate: Monaro
  - Federal division: Eden-Monaro
- Elevation: 664 m (2,178 ft)

Population
  - Total: 57 (2021 census)
- Postcode: 2580
- County: Argyle
- Parish: Boro
Localities around Mayfield
Lower Boro	Lower Boro	Oallen
Boro	Mayfield	Marlowe
Manar	Larbert	Marlowe

Mayfield is a locality in the Queanbeyan–Palerang Regional Council, New South Wales, Australia. It is located about 85 km east of Canberra and 58 km south of Goulburn. At the 2021 census, it had a population of 57. It had an Anglican church, St Luke's from 1895 to 1965. A "half-time" school was located at Virginia station in Mayfield from 1894 to 1899.

== Heritage listings ==
Mayfield has a number of heritage-listed sites, including:

- Charleyong Road: Virginia
