= Toyota Tarago =

The Toyota Tarago is the marketing name for several Toyota people mover vans sold in the Australian market from 1983 to 2019.

- From February 1983 to 1990, the Tarago was a rebadged version of the Toyota TownAce/MasterAce Surf sold in Japan.
- From September 1990 to late 2019, the Tarago had reflected the Toyota Previa model, with new models released in June 2000 and March 2006.

It is named after the Australian town of Tarago, New South Wales. It was replaced by the H300 Granvia.

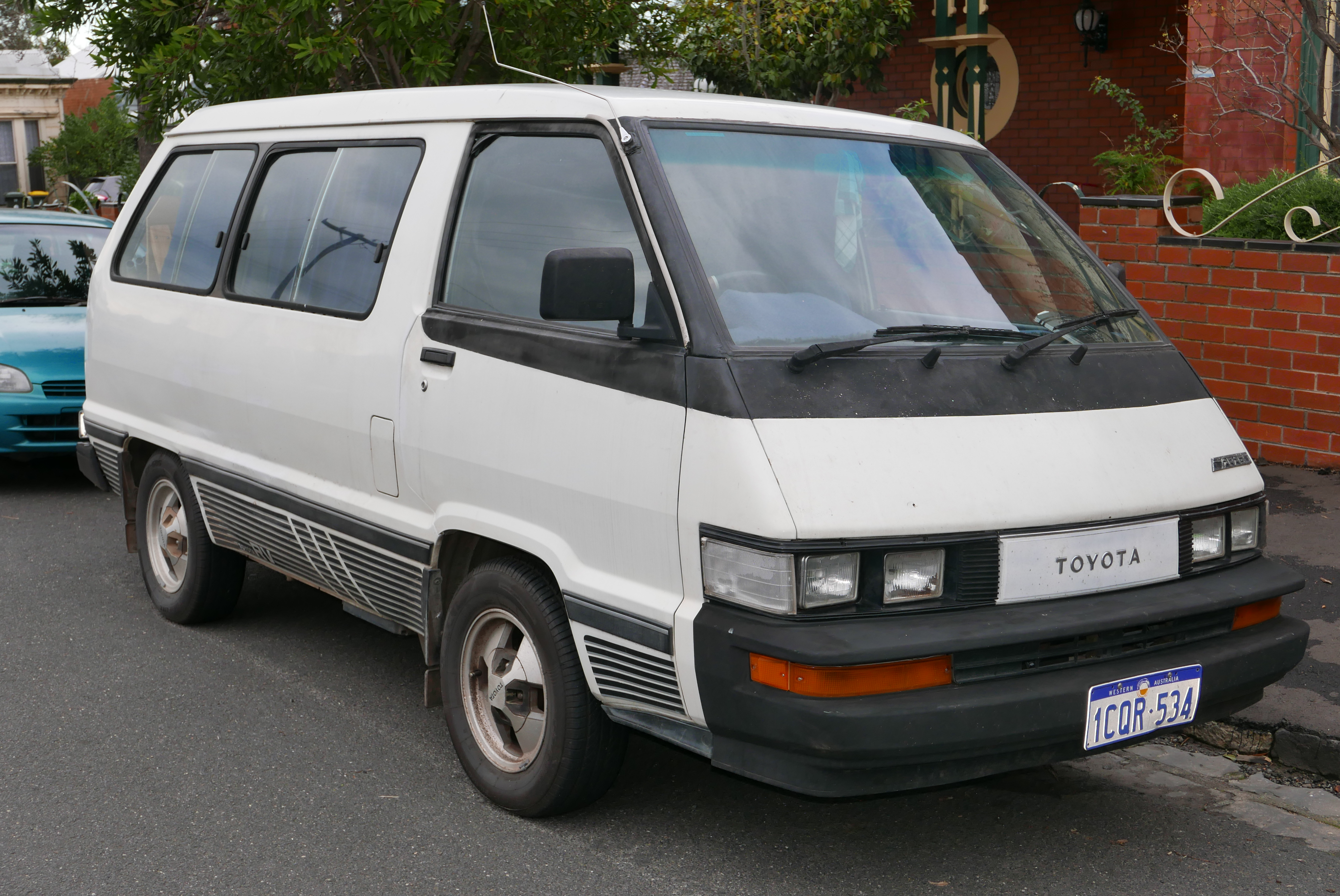
First generation (R20/R30; 1983–1990)

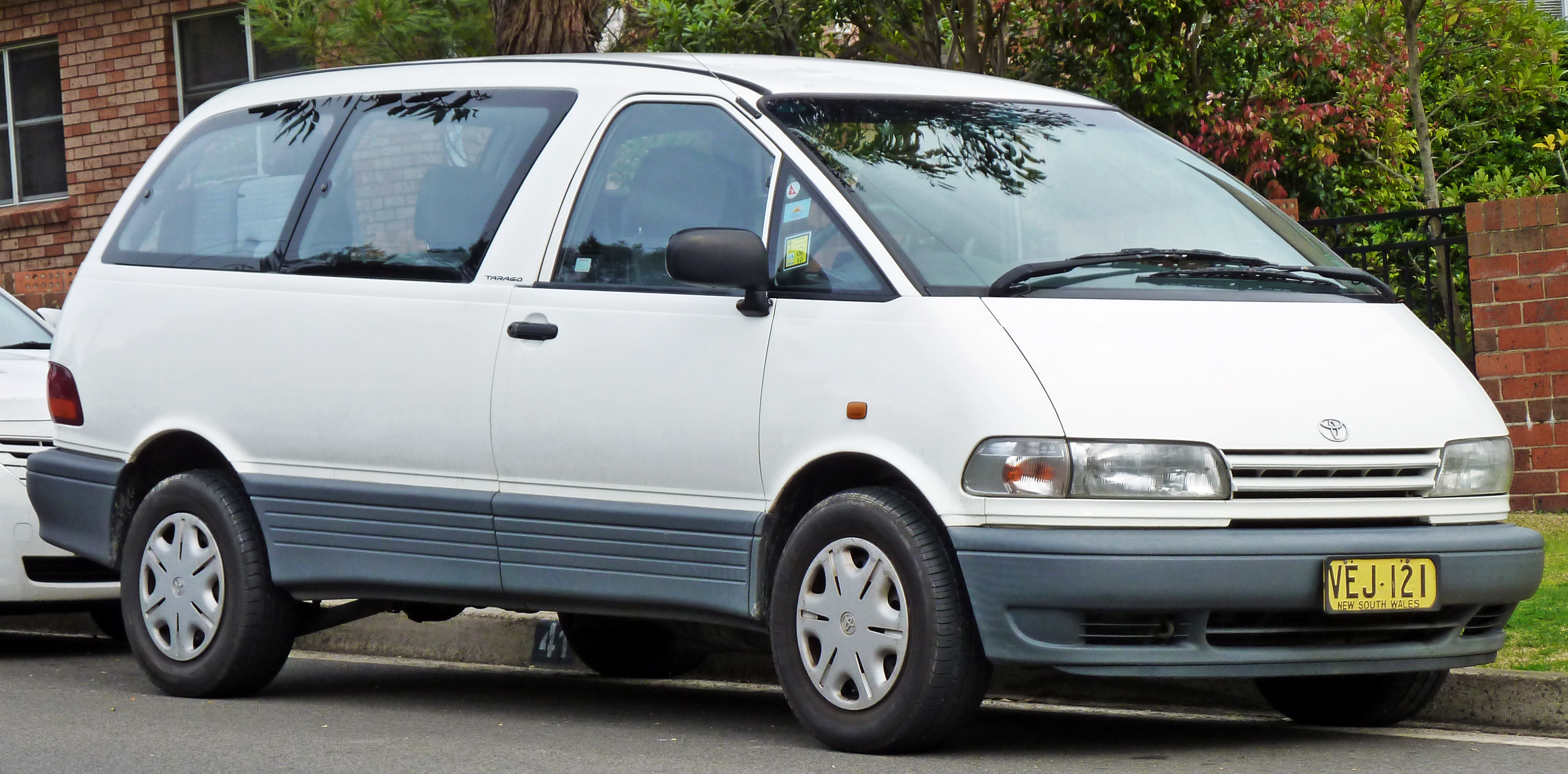
Second generation (XR10; 1990–2000)

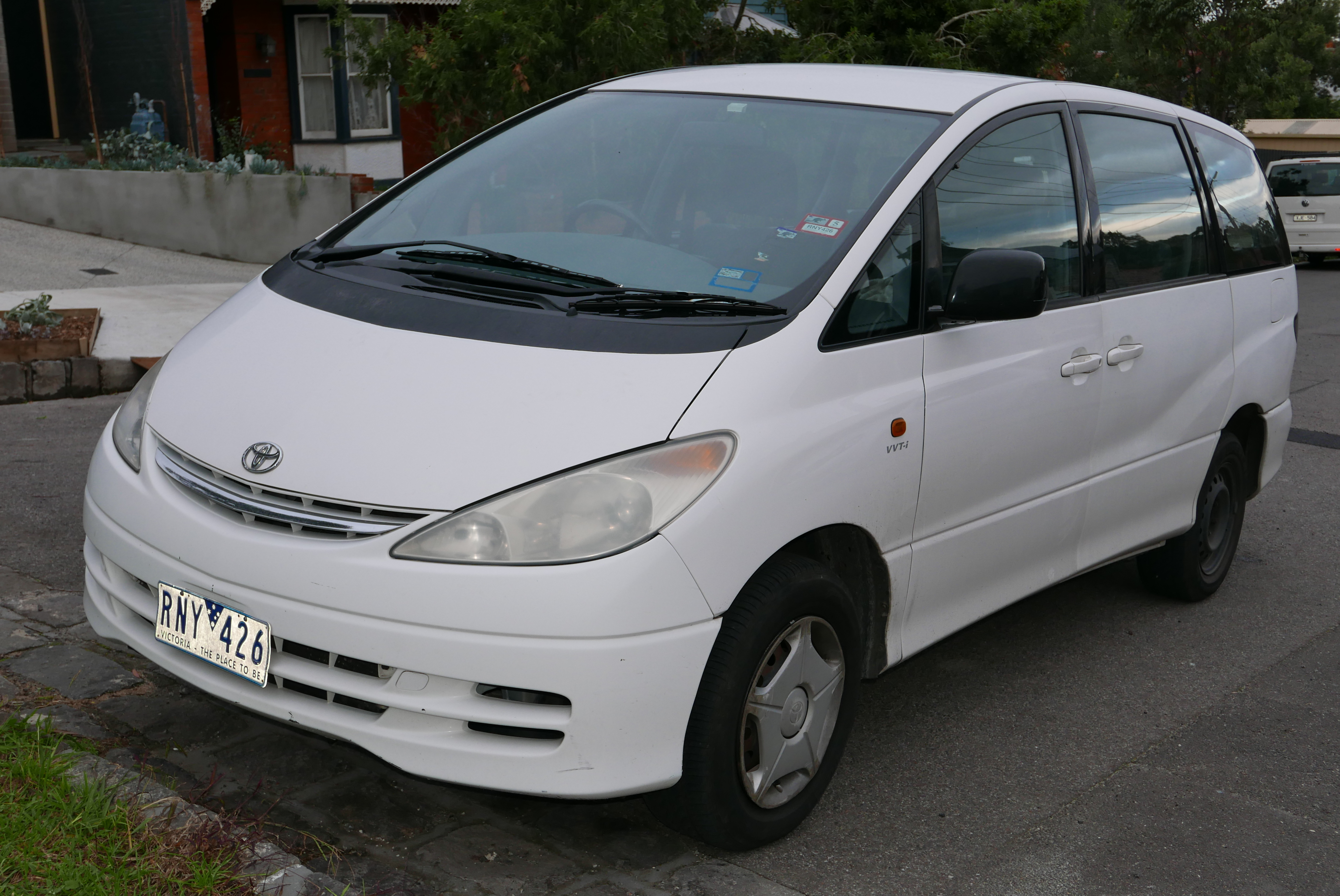
Third generation (XR30; 2000-2005)

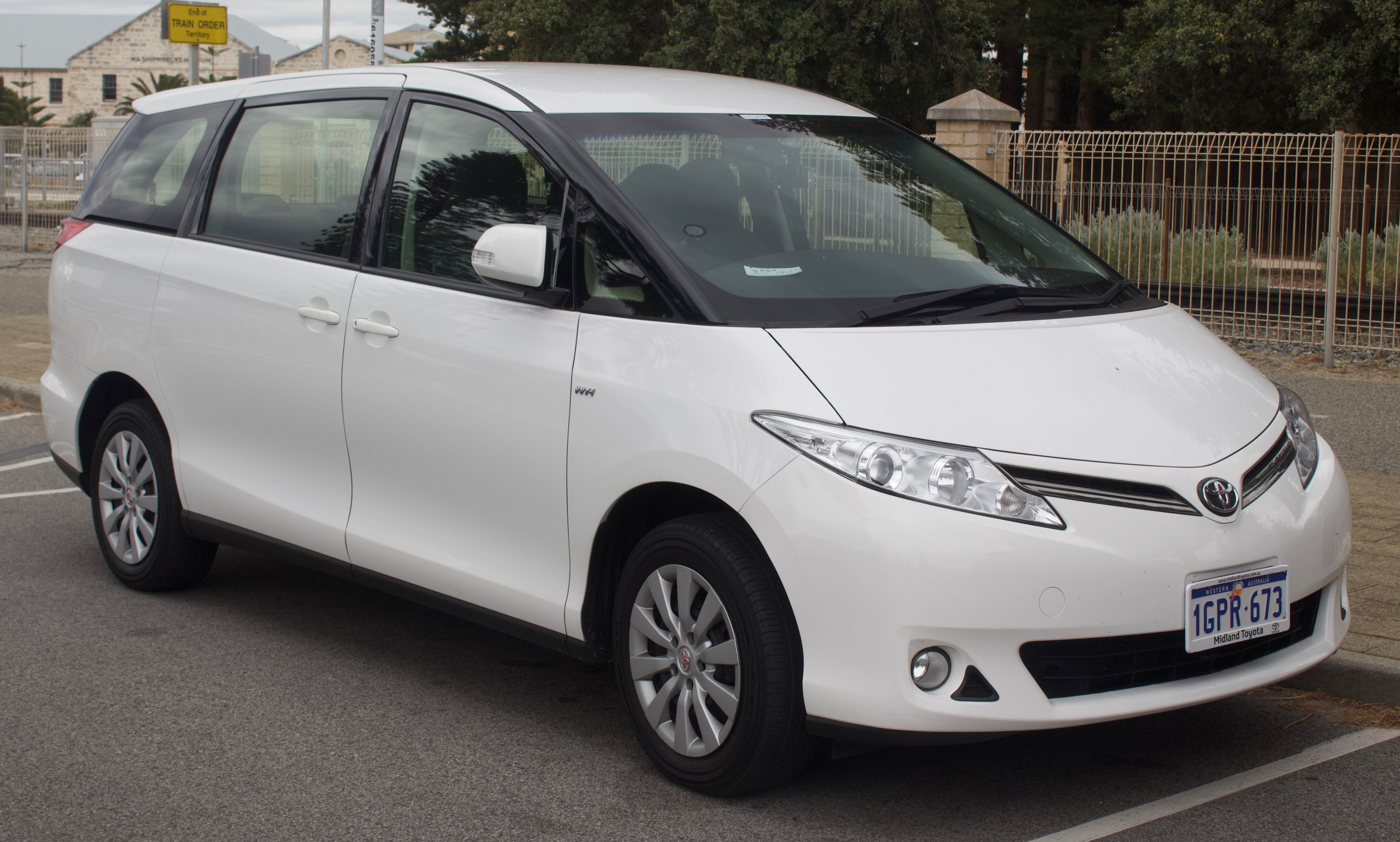
Fourth generation (XR50; 2006–2019)
