= Mulloon =

- Town
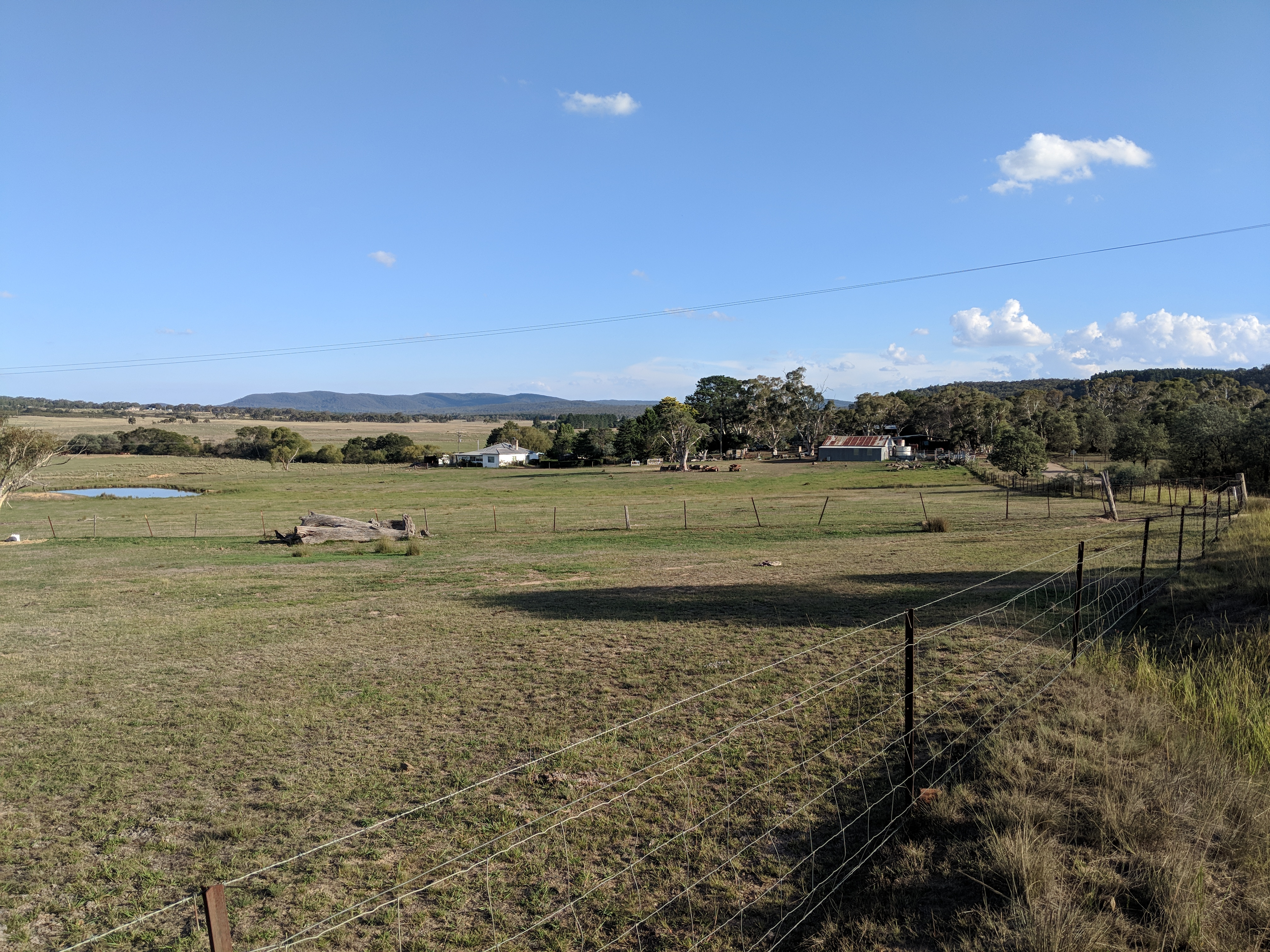
- Mulloon

- Coordinates: 35°15′57″S 149°36′02″E
- Country: Australia
- State: New South Wales
- Region: Southern Tablelands
- LGA: Queanbeyan-Palerang Regional Council
- Location: 66 km (41 mi) E of Canberra; 36 km (22 mi) NW of Braidwood; 53 km (33 mi) E of Queanbeyan; 74 km (46 mi) S of Goulburn; 274 km (170 mi) SW of Sydney

Government
  - State electorate: Monaro
  - Federal division: Eden-Monaro
- Elevation: 720 m (2,360 ft)

Population
  - Total: 144 (2016 census)
- Postcode: 2622
- County: Murray
- Parish: Fairy Meadow, Mulloon
Localities around Mulloon
Mount Fairy	Mount Fairy	Manar
Bungendore	Mulloon	Warri
Palerang	Bombay	Bombay

Mulloon is a locality in the Queanbeyan-Palerang Region, Southern Tablelands, New South Wales, Australia. At the 2016 census, it had a population of 144.

Mulloon lies generally to the south of the Kings Highway between Bungendore and Braidwood on both sides of Mulloon Creek, a tributary of Reedy Creek, which flows into the Shoalhaven River. The high ground along the western edge of the Mulloon Creek catchment is part of the watershed of the Great Dividing Range.

The area now known as Mulloon lies close to the boundaries of the traditional lands of the Ngarigo people, to the west, and the Walbanga people, a group of the Yuin, to the east.

Mulloon had a public school from 1872 to 1886, which operated "half-time". Its "half time" partner school was Ingledow School.

In recent years, the Mulloon Creek catchment has become well known, as the location of projects to revive watercourses and eroded and degraded land. The work began with a demonstration project in 2006, on 3 km of Mulloon Creek at Mulloon. It is now being scaled up to involve around twenty landholders within the catchment, covering 23,000 hectares and 50 km of watercourses.

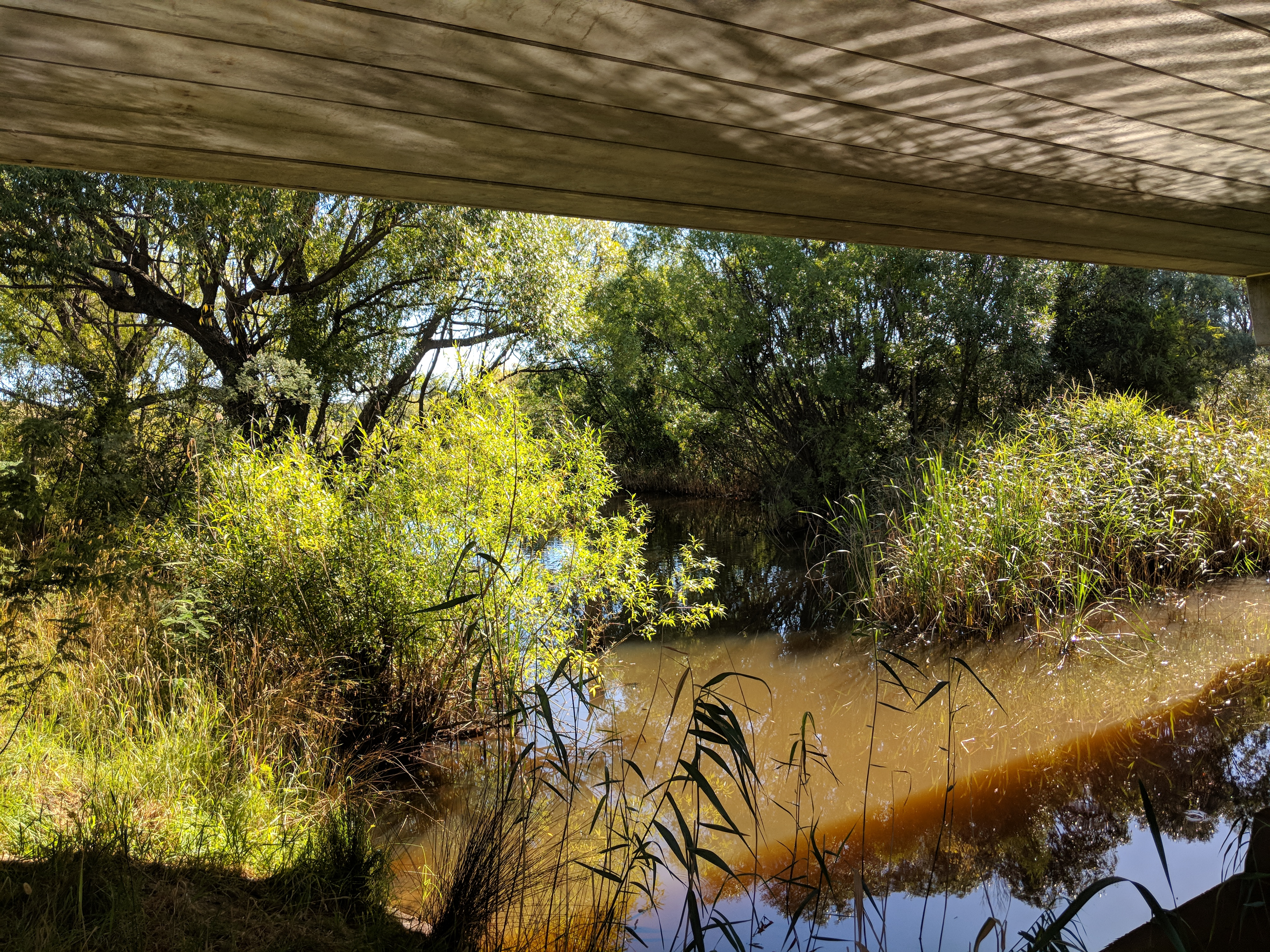
Mulloon Creek under Mulloon Bridge on the Kings Highway
