= Manar, New South Wales =

Manar
- Town
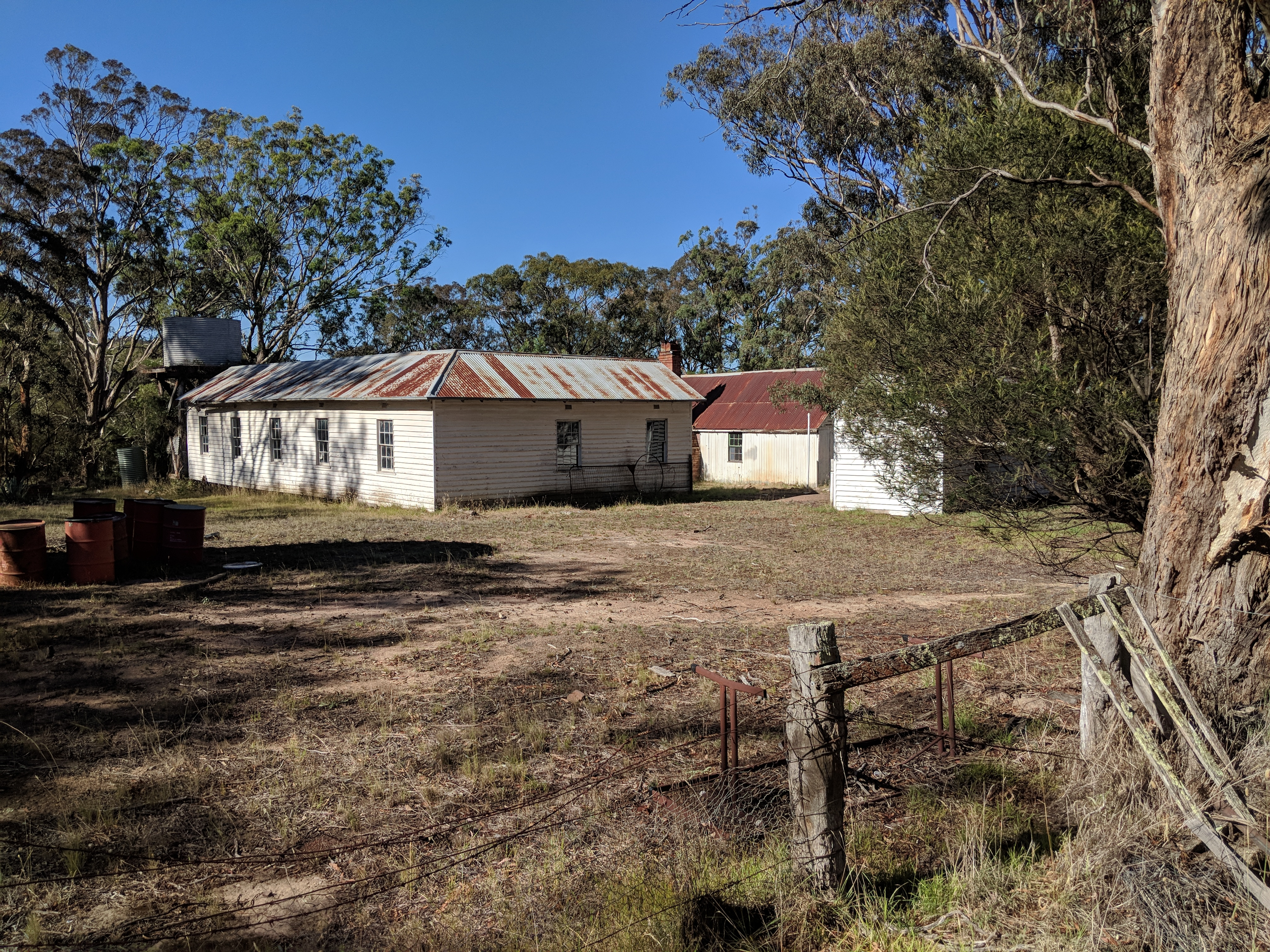
- A building near Manar House

- Coordinates: 35°16′09″S 149°41′01″E
- Country: Australia
- State: New South Wales
- Region: Southern Tablelands
- LGA: Queanbeyan-Palerang Regional Council
- Location: 74 km (46 mi) E of Canberra; 18 km (11 mi) NW of Braidwood; 51 km (32 mi) E of Queanbeyan; 84 km (52 mi) NW of Batemans Bay; 261 km (162 mi) SW of Sydney

Government
  - State electorate: Monaro
  - Federal division: Eden-Monaro
- Elevation: 624 m (2,047 ft)

Population
  - Total: 112 (SAL 2021)
- Postcode: 2622
- County: Murray
- Parish: Warri
Localities around Manar
Mulloon	Boro	Mayfield
Mulloon	Manar	Larbert
Mulloon	Warri	Warri

Manar is a locality in the Queanbeyan-Palerang Region, Southern Tablelands, New South Wales, Australia. It lies on both sides of the Kings Highway between Bungendore and Braidwood at the intersection with the Braidwood–Goulburn road.

Manar was named after Manar House, which was built by Hugh Gordon (–1858) after buying the property in 1841, shortly after his marriage to Mary Macarthur, daughter of Hannibal Hawkins Macarthur. Manar House is described in the New South Wales State Heritage Register as "a good example of a Georgian homestead with outbuildings".

The property had been established in the 1820s by Dr Matthew Anderson with the name of Redesdale. Gordon renamed it after his family house in Inverurie, Scotland. This was named by Gordon's father (of the same name) after the Gulf of Mannar, which separates India and Sri Lanka and was notable for its pearling industry. It was said that the elder Hugh Gordon had made part of his fortune from the pearl trade.

Manar had a public school from 1883 and 1907; from 1896 it operated as a "half-time" school.

Some silver had been detected on the property in 1866.
