= Queanbeyan–Palerang Regional Council =

- Local government area
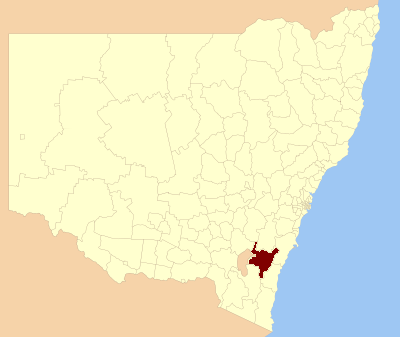
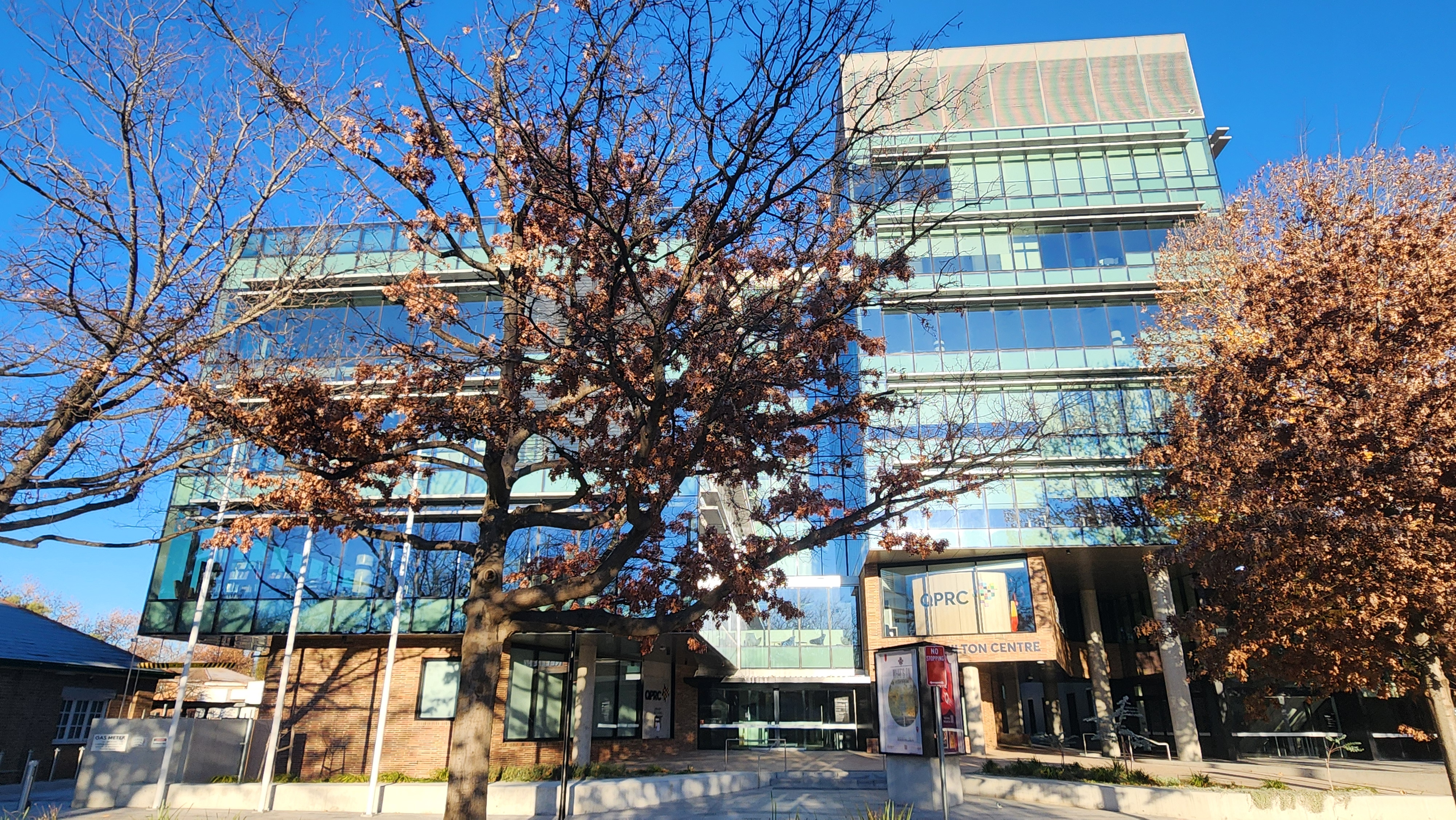
- Location in New South Wales QPRC in Crawford Street, Queanbeyan

- Interactive map of Queanbeyan–Palerang Regional Council
- Coordinates: 35°25′S 149°27′E
- Country: Australia
- State: New South Wales
- Region: Southern Tablelands; Capital Country
- Established: 12 May 2016
- Council seat: Queanbeyan Town Centre

Government
  - Mayor: Kenrick Winchester (Elected as independent but a member of the Australian Labor Party)
  - State electorate: Monaro
  - Federal division: Eden-Monaro

Area
  - Total: 5,319 km^{2} (2,054 sq mi)

Population
  - Total: 63,304 (2021 census)
  - Density: 11.9015/km^{2} (30.8247/sq mi)
- Website: Queanbeyan–Palerang Regional Council
LGAs around Queanbeyan–Palerang Regional Council
| Yass Valley | Upper Lachlan | Goulburn Mulwaree |
| ACT | Queanbeyan–Palerang Regional Council | Shoalhaven |
| ACT | Snowy Monaro | Eurobodalla |

Queanbeyan–Palerang Regional Council is a local government area (LGA) located in the Southern Tablelands region of New South Wales, Australia. The council was formed on 12 May 2016 through a merger of the City of Queanbeyan and Palerang Council.

The council has an area of 5,319 square kilometres (2,054 sq mi) and lies between the eastern boundary of the Australian Capital Territory and the coastal escarpment on both sides of the Great Dividing Range. At the 2021 census it had a population of 63,304. At the time of its establishment the council had an estimated population of 56,368.

== Towns and localities ==
The Queanbeyan urban area contains the following localities

- Crestwood
- Environa
- Googong
- Greenleigh
- Jerrabomberra
- Karabar
- Queanbeyan East
- Queanbeyan West
- Queanbeyan Town Centre
- The Ridgeway
- Royalla
- Tralee

The balance of the Queanbeyan–Palerang Regional Council area contains the towns of:

- Braidwood
- Bungendore

It also contains the following localities:

- Araluen
- Back Creek
- Ballalaba
- Bendoura
- Berlang
- Bombay
- Boro
- Budawang
- Burra
- Bywong
- Carwoola
- Captains Flat
- Charleys Forest
- Corang
- Currawang
- Durran Durra
- Farringdon
- Forbes Creek
- Harolds Cross
- Hereford Hall
- Hoskinstown
- Jembaicumbene
- Jerrabattgulla
- Jinden
- Kindervale
- Krawarree
- Lake George
- Larbert
- Majors Creek
- Manar
- Marlowe
- Mayfield
- Monga
- Mongarlowe
- Mount Fairy
- Mulloon
- Neringla
- Nerriga
- Northangera
- Oallen (part)
- Palerang
- Primrose Valley
- Reidsdale
- Rossi
- Royalla
- Snowball
- Sutton (part)
- Tarago (part)
- Tinderry (part)
- Tomboye
- Urila
- Wamboin
- Warri
- Williamsdale
- Wog Wog
- Wyanbene
- Yarrow

== Demographics ==
The population for the predecessor councils was estimated in 2015 as:

- 40,657 in City of Queanbeyan and
- 15,897 in Palerang Council

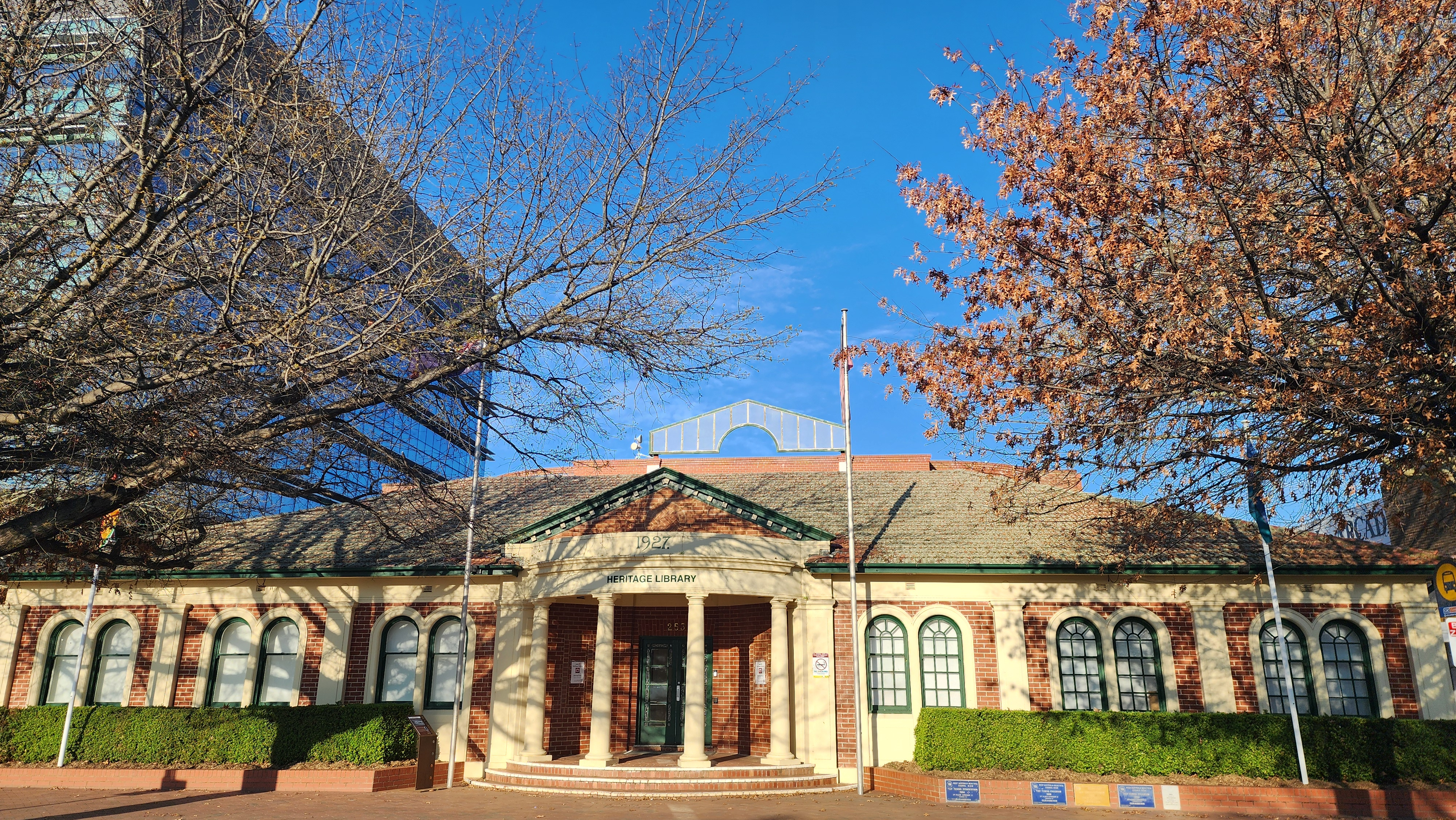
Today, former Queanbeyan–Palerang Regional Council is Frank Pangallo Heritage Library

== Council ==
Queanbeyan–Palerang Regional Council comprises eleven Councillors elected proportionally in a single ward. Independent Labor councillor Kenrick Winchester was elected mayor in January 2022.

The current composition of council is:

| Party | Councillors |
|---|---|
| Independents | 4 |
| Labor | 3 |
| Liberal | 2 |
| Greens | 1 |
| Independent Labor | 1 |
| Total | 11 |

== Election results ==
=== 2024 ===
2024 New South Wales local elections: Queanbeyan–Palerang
| Party | Candidate | Votes | % | ±% |
|---|---|---|---|---|
| Liberal | 1. Ross Macdonald (elected 1); 2. Mark Schweikert (elected 5); 3. Morgan Broadbent (elected 10); 4. Robert Schwartz; 5. Louise Burton; 6. Jacqueline Ternouth; 7. Wayne Brown; 8. Margaret Royds | 8,248 | 23.3 | +6.1 |
| Team Winchester | 1. Kenrick Winchester (elected 3); 2. Bill Waterhouse (elected 7); 3. Margot Sachse; 4. Kylie Prescott; 5. Alex Tine; 6. Shane Shipa; 7. Peter Lindbeck; 8. Dean Martin; 9. Tony Wood; 10. Tony Rayner; 11. Jan Browne | 7,785 | 22.0 | +5.7 |
| Labor | 1. Bryce Wilson (elected 2); 2. Esma Livermore (elected 6); 3. John Preston (elected 11); 4. Barrina South; 5. Timothy Nicholson; 6. Shelley Evans; 7. Michael MacWilliam | 7,198 | 20.3 | −1.6 |
| Grundy Independents | 1. Mareeta Grundy (elected 4); 2. Shane Ivimey; 3. Johnny Lange; 4. Rachel Scattergood; 5. Antoni (Billie) Woods; 6. Bec Edwards; 7. Sian Rinaldi; 8. Michael Bagley | 3,478 | 9.8 | +0.4 |
| Greens | 1. Katrina Willis (elected 8); 2. James Ansell; 3. Tonya Rooney; 4. Kathleen Maher; 5. Gregory Buckman; 6. Simon Wooldridge | 2,929 | 8.3 | −1.7 |
| Independent | 1. Steve Taskovski (elected 9); 2. Manpreet Singh Cheema; 3. Velice Trajanoski; 4. Lou Baldan; 5. Samantha Kirchner; 6. Bashir Fayaq; 7. Charles Tran; 8. Hasina Ahmed; 9. Frank Agresta; 10. Alan Hill; 11. Zoran Duckinoski | 2,555 | 7.2 | −0.2 |
| Independent | 1. Trevor Hicks; 2. Scott Hart; 3. Natasha Abbott; 4. Horst Kirchner; 5. Bonnie O'Brien; 6. Jason Webb | 1,194 | 3.4 | |
| Sustainable Australia | 1. James Holgate; 2. Michael Thompson; 3. John Reynolds; 4. Katrina Holgate; 5. Darren Garnon; 6. Philip Snare | 1,082 | 3.1 | +3.0 |
| Independent | 1. Rachael Macdonald; 2. Wayne Reynolds; 3. May Kowalski; 4. Todd McKittrick; 5. Samantha Kew; 6. Joanne Lawrence | 565 | 1.6 | |
| Independent | Richard Graham | 370 | 1.1 | |
| Total formal votes | | 35,404 | 95.1 | |
| Informal votes | | 1,822 | 4.9 | |
| Turnout | | 37,226 | 82.1 | |

=== 2021 ===
| Elected councillor | Party |
|---|---|
| Bryce Wilson | Labor |
| Esma Livermore | Labor |
| John Preston | Labor |
| Kenrick Winchester | A New Chapter |
| Edwina Webster | A New Chapter |
| Louise Burton | Liberal |
| Jacqueline Ternouth | Liberal |
| Katrina Willis | Greens |
| Mareeta Grundy | Independent (Group B) |
| Steve Taskovski | Independent (Group D) |
| Michele Biscotti | Team Biscotti |

2021 New South Wales local elections: Queanbeyan–Palerang
| Party | Candidate | Votes | % | ±% |
|---|---|---|---|---|
| Labor | | 7,398 | 21.9 | +8.2 |
| A New Chapter | | 5,847 | 17.3 | |
| Liberal | | 5,829 | 17.2 | +8.0 |
| Greens | | 3,389 | 10.0 | +3.5 |
| Independent (Group B) | | 3,168 | 9.4 | |
| Independent (Group D) | | 2,518 | 7.4 | |
| Team Biscotti | | 2,205 | 6.5 | |
| Independent | Bill Waterhouse | 1,181 | 3.5 | |
| Independent (Group H) | | 1,021 | 3.0 | |
| Independent (Group C) | | 1,004 | 3.0 | |
| Independent | Ginevra Peisley | 93 | 0.3 | |
| Independent (Group E) | | 87 | 0.3 | |
| Independent | James Holgate | 43 | 0.1 | |
| Independent | Kyol Booth-Hunt | 31 | 0.1 | |
| Total formal votes | | 33,813 | 95.3 | +1.1 |
| Informal votes | | 1,684 | 4.7 | −1.1 |
| Turnout | | 35,497 | 86.1 | +7.8 |

== See also ==
- Local government areas of New South Wales
