= Araluen =

Araluen may refer to:

== Places in Australia ==
New South Wales

- Araluen, New South Wales, small town

Northern Territory

- Araluen, Northern Territory, a suburb of Alice Springs
  - Araluen Cultural Precinct, Alice Springs, which includes the Araluen Arts Centre
- Electoral division of Araluen, covering Alice Springs CBD, the suburb of Araluen, and some rural areas

Queensland

- Araluen, Queensland, a suburb of Gympie

Western Australia

- Araluen Botanic Park
- Araluen Pumpback Dam
- Araluen-Wungong Important Bird Area

== People ==
- Evelyn Araluen, Indigenous Australian poet

== Other uses ==
- Araluen Gum, common name of Eucalyptus kartzoffiana
- Araluen Kingdom, a fictional place in the Ranger's Apprentice and Brotherband series of novels
- Araluen Zieria, common name of Zieria adenophora
