= Majors Creek, New South Wales =

Majors Creek New South Wales
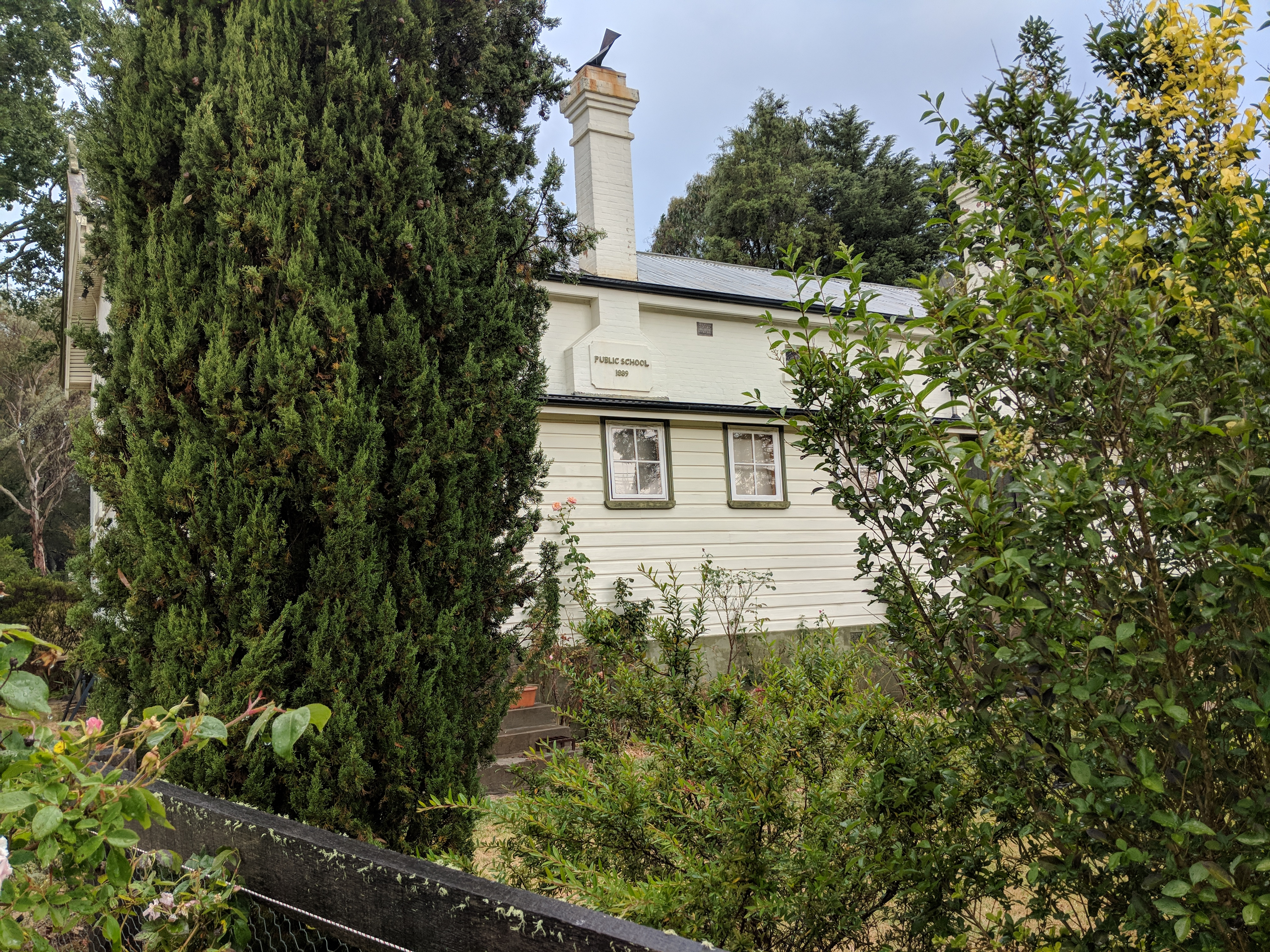
- The former Majors Creek School, now a residence

- Coordinates: 35°34′16″S 149°44′20″E
- Population: 290 (2021 census)
- Established: 1851
- Postcode(s): 2622
- Elevation: 700 m (2,297 ft)
- Location: 16 km (10 mi) S of Braidwood; 103 km (64 mi) SE of Canberra; 80 km (50 mi) WNW of Batemans Bay; 302 km (188 mi) SSW of Sydney
- LGA(s): Queanbeyan–Palerang
- Region: Southern Tablelands
- County: St Vincent
- Parish: Elrington
- State electorate(s): Monaro
- Federal division(s): Eden-Monaro
Localities around Majors Creek:
Bendoura	Jembaicumbene	Reidsdale
Bendoura	Majors Creek	Reidsdale
Ballalaba	Berlang	Araluen

Majors Creek is a small village in the Southern Tablelands region of New South Wales, Australia. The nearest major town is Braidwood, 16 km (9.9 mi) to the north. At the 2021 census, the population of Majors Creek was 290. A former gold mining town, the settlement is today associated with the operational Dargues Reef gold mine. The name, Majors Creek is also applied to the surrounding area, for postal and statistical purposes.

It lies to the east of the Great Dividing Range, on high ground, near a watershed between the Shoalhaven River catchment and the Deua-Moruya River catchment. It is on the upper part of Majors Creek (the watercourse), a tributary of Araluen Creek and a part of the Deua-Moruya catchment. Nearby Back Creek and Jembaicumbene Creek are tributaries of the Shoalhaven River; 36km by road west of Majors Creek, Captains Flat is on the Molonglo River, a tributary of the Murrumbidgee, in the Murray-Darling catchment.

The area now known as Majors Creek lies on the traditional lands of Walbanga people, a group of Yuin. Probably due to reasons such as finding a viable means of sustenance, most of the surviving Aborigines living in the goldfields around Braidwood, migrated toward the coast—also Walbanga country—in the later years of the 19th century. Local Aboriginal people were inhabiting the Majors Creek area, until at least the very early years of the 20th century.

After settler colonisation, Majors Creek lay within the Nineteen Counties that were open to settlement. Land was granted to Major William Sandys Elrington—'Mount Elrington', at nearby Farringdon —which was extended, in 1831. Although he may have used land around what is now Majors Creek for grazing, he seems not to have had title over that area. Around 1840, a settlement officially known as Elrington came into being; from the time of the first gold mining around 1851, it was better known as Majors Creek. Both these names stem from Major William Sandys Elrington.

Elrington had a 29-year military career, including service in the Peninsula War, before selling his commission, in 1826, and migrating to Australia, in 1827, and taking up a grant of land. Elrington sold his land and left Australia for good, in 1846; he, therefore, did not benefit from the discovery of gold, five years later.

Alluvial gold was discovered by Mrs Baxter, in 1851, and soon there were 2,000 miners, averaging an ounce of gold per day each. The alluvial gold lasted until around 1856, by which time most of the damage to the creek bed and watercourse — still evident today—had occurred. From 1869 to 1874, the focus of mining turned to quartz reef mining. Majors Creek was not well suited to gold dredge mining, which occurred at other nearby goldfields, such as Jembaicumbene and Araluen, in the early years of the 20th century. By 1914, most mining activity at Majors Creek was over, but there was a largely unsuccessful attempted revival during the 1930s. The last of the old reef mines was closed by the Second World War. Until July 2024, there was modern gold mining in the area, at the Dargues Reef mine.

Still officially known as Elrington, the plan of a town was laid out by surveyor W.E.Larmer, in 1858. The modern-day village's only commercial business, its hotel and post office agency is still known as the Elrington Hotel. The existing hotel was built in 1913, replacing an earlier hotel that stood on a site opposite to it. In its heyday, the town had a police station, post office, several churches and schools, four hotels and 24 stores. Few of the mainly timber buildings from the gold rush era survive today.

The bushranger Ben Hall and his gang made a surprise attack on the Araluen gold escort on 13 March 1865, as it travelled up the old mountain road, just outside Majors Creek. Constable John Kelly was seriously wounded. The driver, John Blatchford, was slightly wounded, but was able to run downhill toward Araluen, to summon assistance. The gold was fearlessly defended by Constable Daniel Byrne. The other two police—Stayplton and Mac Ellicott—dismounted and tried to outflank the bushrangers, who escaped empty-handed. The wagonette that was carrying the gold is preserved in the Braidwood Museum. Only weeks later, Hall was shot and killed by police, near Forbes. There is a marker at the site of the attack.

Majors Creek had a public school from 1857 to 1967. The old school building, dating from 1889, lies in a part of Majors Creek that was originally set aside as a small private town, known as Inkley.

In the 1870s, an Italian-born stonemason, Peter Rusconi, built the stone parts of the bridge over Major’s Creek (the one on the main road, on the way into the town from Braidwood) and St Stephen’s Anglican Church.

The town is also the venue for the biennial Music At The Creek festival.
