= Johann Leopold Zillmann =

German missionary (1813–1892)[

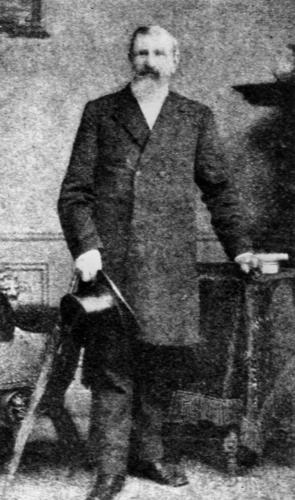
Johann Leopold Zillmann

Johann Leopold Zillmann (1813–1892) was a German missionary to Australia. Born in Neu-Ulm, and a blacksmith by trade, he joined Carl Wilhelm Schmidt and Christopher Eipper at the Zion Hill Mission in what is now the Brisbane suburb of Nundah in Queensland. After the mission closed, Zillmann stayed in the area and turned to farming.

== Life ==
"On 31 May 1858, John Leopold Zillman purchased Portion 162, consisting of 29 acres 3 roods in area on Sandgate Road. He also purchased the adjoining portion 161 of 35 acres. In 1864 the land was bought by Thomas Ward, William Clayton and George Paddle."

On 18 June 1861 J. L. Zillman, Esq. was a witness at the Select Committee on the Native Police Force, at which he supported the work of the Native Police. He discussed the perceived successes and failures of the Mission in regard to Aboriginal people, and gave his opinion on the causes of frontier conflict. He said:- "I have found the blacks to be much the same as our own race."

== Legacy ==
The suburb of Zillmere is named for Zillmann, as are the Zillman Waterholes and Zillman Road in Brisbane.
