= Berlang =

- Town
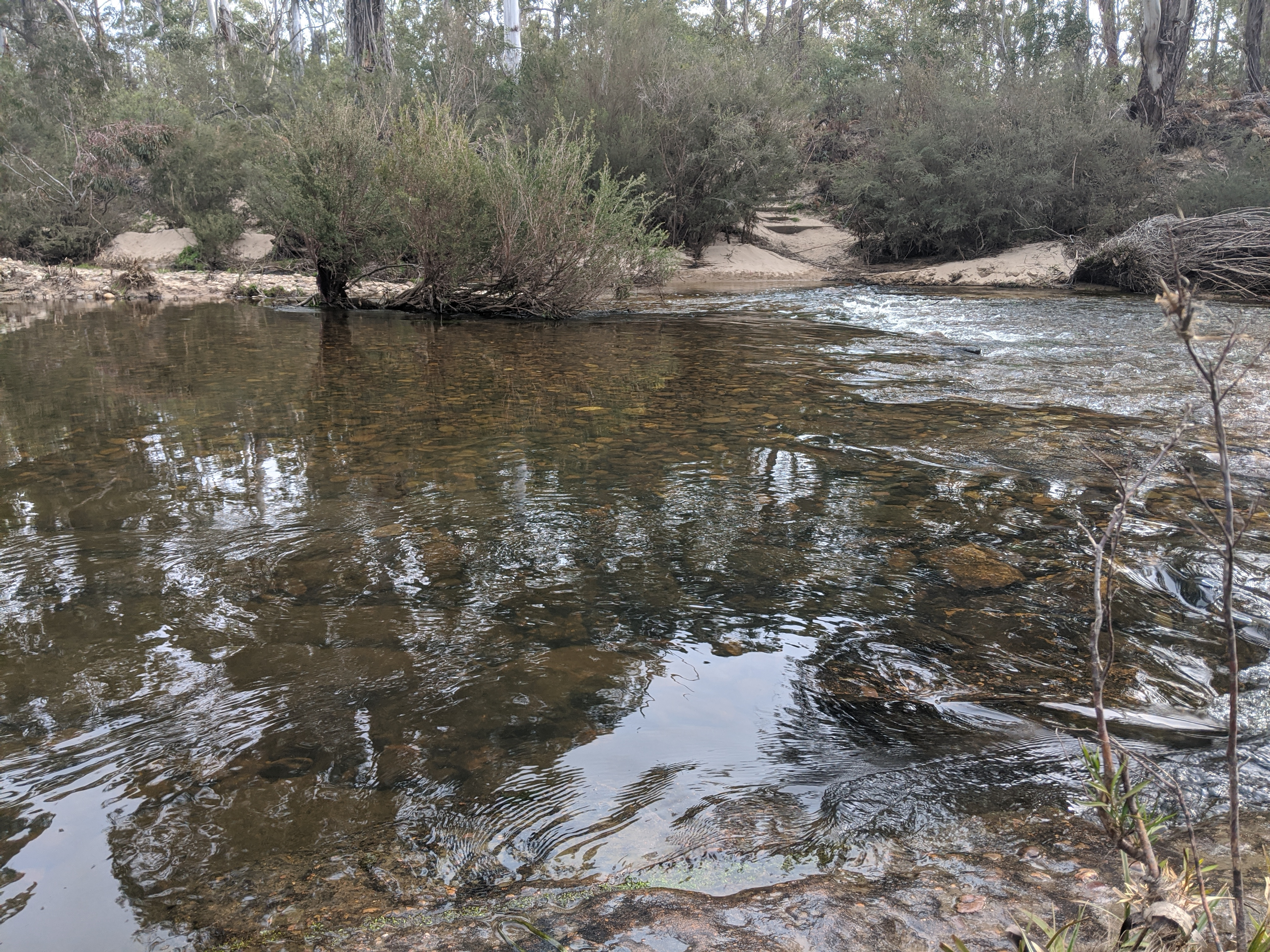
- The Shoalhaven at Berlang camping area in 2020

- Coordinates: 35°39′02″S 149°39′02″E
- Country: Australia
- State: New South Wales
- Region: Southern Tablelands
- LGA: Queanbeyan-Palerang Regional Council
- Location: 55 km (34 mi) E of Canberra; 39 km (24 mi) SSW of Braidwood; 100 km (62 mi) W of Batemans Bay; 322 km (200 mi) SSW of Sydney

Government
  - State electorate: Monaro
  - Federal division: Eden-Monaro
- Elevation: 702 m (2,303 ft)

Population
  - Total: 0 (SAL 2016)
- Postcode: 2622
- County: Murray
- Parish: Tallaganda
Localities around Berlang
Ballalaba	Majors Creek	Araluen
Krawarree	Berlang	Neringla
Krawarree	Wyanbene	Neringla

Berlang is a locality in Queanbeyan-Palerang Regional Council, New South Wales, Australia. It was previously called Tallaganda. The town lies about 44 km south of Braidwood on the upper Shoalhaven River and the road to Cooma. At the 2021 census, it had a population of none. It includes part of the Deua National Park and the Berlang State Conservation Area. The Big Hole is a notable geological feature in the locality and the Deua National Park.
