= Krawarree =

- Town
- Coordinates: 35°49′57″S 149°38′02″E
- Country: Australia
- State: New South Wales
- Region: Southern Tablelands
- LGA: Queanbeyan-Palerang Regional Council
- Location: 40 km (25 mi) S of Braidwood; 97 km (60 mi) SE of Canberra; 92 km (57 mi) NE of Cooma; 106 km (66 mi) W of Batemans Bay; 326 km (203 mi) SW of Sydney

Government
  - State electorate: Monaro
  - Federal division: Eden-Monaro
- Elevation: 721 m (2,365 ft)

Population
  - Total: 82 (SAL 2021)
- Postcode: 2622
- County: Murray County
- Parish: Krawarree
Localities around Krawarree
Jerrabattgulla	Ballalaba	Berlang
Hereford Hall	Krawarree	Wyanbene
Jinden	Jinden	Wyanbene

Krawarree is a rural locality in Queanbeyan–Palerang Regional Council.

Krawarree is on the Shoalhaven River, and the nearest town is Braidwood, which is about 40 km to the north.
