= Torrington Blatchford =

- Born: 1871; Araluen, New South Wales
- Died: 27 May 1938; Roeburne, Western Australia
- Education: Newington College; University of Sydney
- Occupation: Geologist

Torrington Blatchford (1871–1938) was an Australian geologist and was Government Geologist in Western Australia from 1929 until 1934.

== Birth and education ==
Blatchford was born in Araluen, New South Wales to the prosperous gold buyer John Huxham Blatchford (1828-1894) and Thirza Pierce Blatchford (1831-1905). Both parents were born in Plymouth, Devon, and met and married in Sydney. From the family home in Braidwood, New South Wales, Blatchford attended Newington College (1886—1891) and was active in the Cadets Corps and the Rifle Team. He went up to the University of Sydney and graduated as a Bachelor of Arts in 1894. Blatchford then commenced study in the Faculty of Engineering but this was interrupted by his move to Western Australia.

== Western Australia ==
In 1897, Blatchford moved to Western Australia and was appointed as senior assistant geologist in the Mines Department. He left the department after four years to become assistant metallurgist and surveyor to the Paddington Consols Company. After 18 months he went into partnership as a mining engineer in the firm of Black, Blatchford and Grut in Kalgoorlie. After private practice, he rejoined the Mines Department in 1912 and subsequently was appointed Assistant State Mining Engineer. He became Government Geologist in November 1928 and on an expedition to Central Australia in 1931 he went in search of Lasseter's Reef. In recognition of his geological work in the Kimberleys, largely in connection with the search for oil, he was appointed to the executive of the Council for Scientific and Industrial Research. Blatchford died in Roeburne, Western Australia, and was survived by a widow and three sons.

== Publications ==
- The geology of the Coolgardie Goldfield (Perth, W.A., Government Printer, 1899)
- The Phillips River mining district (Perth, W.A., Government Printer, 1900)
- The mining geology of the Kanowna main reef line, Kanowna, North-East Coolgardie Goldfield (Perth, W.A., Government Printer, 1912)
- Geological investigations in the area embracing the Burbanks and Londonderry mining centres, with special reference to the ore deposits and their future prospects (Perth, W.A., Government Printer, 1913)
- Mineral resources of the north west division, investigations in 1912 (Perth, W.A., Government Printer, 1913)
- Interim report on the graphite deposits at Munglinup, Eucla division (Perth, W.A., Government Printer, 1917)
- The geology of portions of the Kimberley Division, with special reference to the Fitroy Basin and the possibilities of the occurrence of mineral oil (Perth, W.A., Government Printer, 1927)
