= Jembaicumbene =

- Town
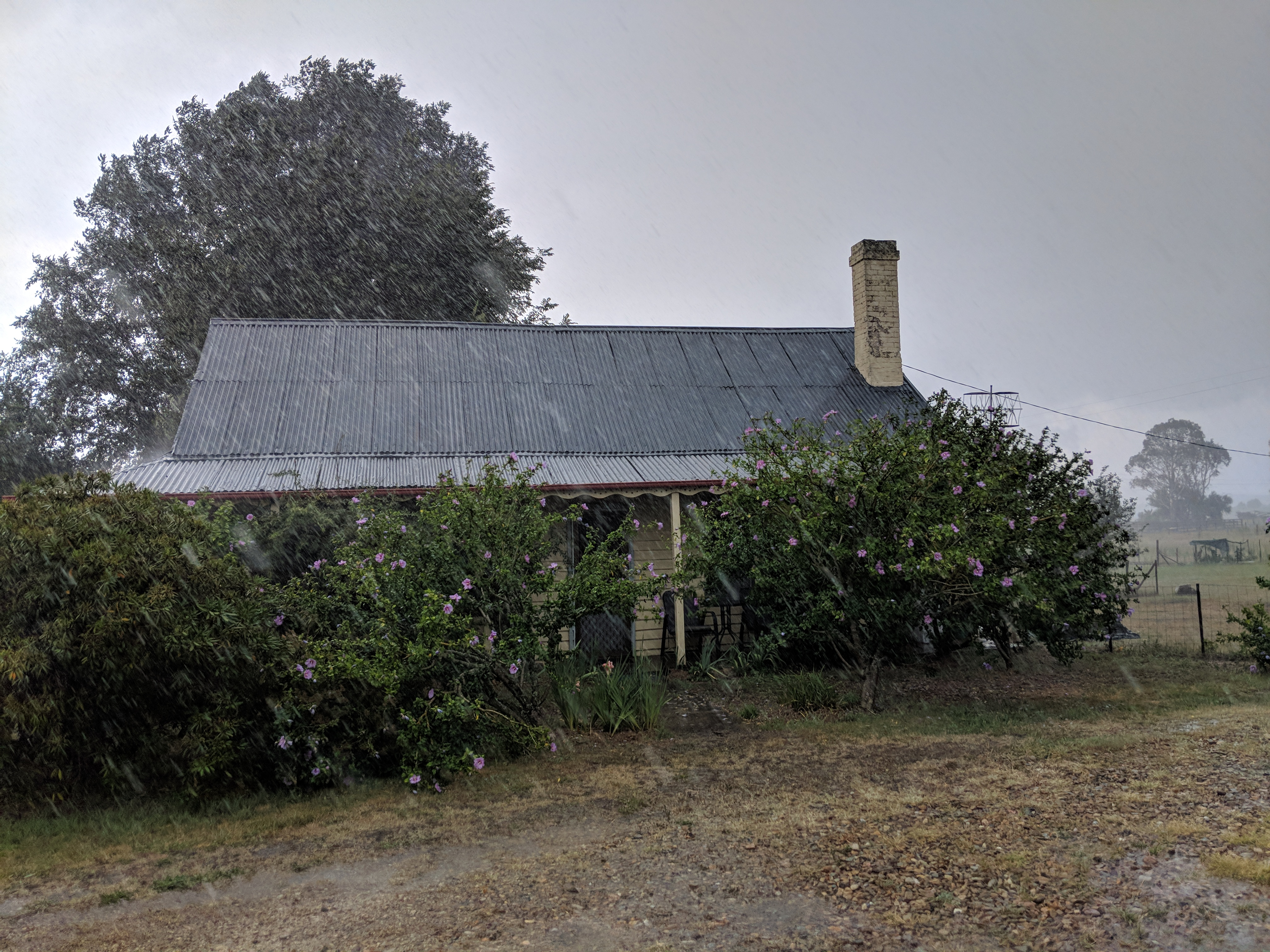

- Interactive map of Jembaicumbene
- Coordinates: 35°30′55″S 149°47′05″E
- Country: Australia
- State: New South Wales
- Region: Southern Tablelands
- LGA: Queanbeyan–Palerang Regional Council
- Location: 9 km (5.6 mi) S of Braidwood; 96 km (60 mi) SE of Canberra; 9 km (5.6 mi) NE of Majors Creek

Government
  - State electorate: Monaro
  - Federal division: Eden-Monaro

Population
  - Total: 64 (SAL 2021)
- Postcode: 2622
- County: St Vincent
- Parish: Boyle
Localities around Jembaicumbene
Braidwood	Braidwood	Braidwood
Bendoura	Jembaicumbene	Reidsdale
Bendoura	Majors Creek	Reidsdale

Jembaicumbene (pronounced Jemmi-c'm-bene) is a locality in the Southern Tablelands of New South Wales, Australia, located 8 km (5 miles) out along the Braidwood–Majors Creek Road. Once a thriving goldfield, it is now a peaceful valley on the way to Majors Creek. The mining village of the same name is now virtually a ghost town.

The area now known as Jembaicumbene lies on the traditional lands of Walbanga people, a group of Yuin. Settlers took over land in the area from the 1830s.

In 1853, Jembaicumbene Creek and it tributaries were proclaimed a goldfield. By 1859, there were over a thousand gold miners on the creek, including six hundred Chinese miners. Land for the site of a village of Jembaicumbene was set aside on 1 February 1867. By 1868, it had "many stores, hotels, and business places, as well as a large flour-mill".

The village was located just to the north of Jembaicumbene Creek, a tributary of the Shoalhaven River. Majors Creek Road was its main street, Gillamatong Street, within the village boundaries. Parts of several of its old streets, North, Peel, and Howe Streets still appear on modern-day maps. Stands of fine old trees mark former home sites and the upturned earth along the length of the Jembaicumbene Creek bears witness to the efforts of many hopeful miners, and the later activities of several dredge mining companies.

The Jembaicumbene Steam Flour Mills was built by Charles Dransfield in 1859, and opened in January 1860. The mill building was designed by Sydney architect-surveyor C E Langley. The engineering works for the mill, including supplying the milling equipment, chaff cutters, lift, and 20-horsepower steam engine, were by P. N. Russell & Co. The mill building still stands and has been repurposed. It is today the most substantial building that survives from the gold rush era.

By 1874, the steam mill was still in operation, but Jembaicumbene was described as a "quiet village". Although there was still much alluvial gold, in the swampy creek bed at Jembaicumbene, mining it by conventional techniques proved impossible, due to the large amount and high level of groundwater . Gold dredging, a technique widely used in New Zealand, had been introduced to New South Wales in 1899 by Charles Lancelot Garland, and this new mining technique was perfectly suited to the swampy goldfield. The gold dredges brought about a revival in gold mining at Jembaicumbene, from around 1901 to at least 1917, but did considerable damage to the land.

In 1905, the village had a hotel, post office, blacksmith, school, two churches and many houses.

Horse racing was the most important leisure activity for the miners in the old days, and the social life for the settlers centred largely around the race meetings, held on courses which have now disappeared. The date of the annual race meeting at Jembaicumbene was traditionally New Year's Day; that annual day of racing occurring from, at latest 1863, until at least 1903. A race meeting at Jembaicumbene, for Chinese New Year in 1873, was organised by the prominent naturalised ethnic-Chinese mine owner and businessman, Mei Quong Tart (梅光达)—who came from China to the Braidwood area, in 1859, with an uncle, at the age of nine—and others of the area's Chinese community.

Jembaicumbene (or nearby Ballalaba) was the birthplace of Archer, winner of the first two Melbourne Cups in 1861 and 1862. Foaled at the "Exeter Farm", it was also his last home where he was retired to stud, and where he is believed to be buried. Several other Melbourne Cup winners were also bred in the district.

The other interesting connection between Jembaicumbene and the horse Archer, is that Helen "Ellen" de Mestre, the aboriginal first child of Archer's trainer Etienne de Mestre was born in the area, and some of his Aboriginal grandchildren and great-grandchildren were born there. One of Etienne's great-grandchildren, Guboo Ted Thomas (1909–2002), went on to become an important leader in the Aboriginal community in the South Coast area of New South Wales, which is also Yuin country. He was a spiritual leader, and the last initiated tribal elder on the South Coast. Guboo was born under a gum tree at Jembaicumbene.

Jembaicumbene had a public school from 1870 to 1934, but it was classified as a part-time school from 1929 to 1931 and a provisional school from 1931 to 1934. The post office, which opened in 1861, closed on 28 March 1979.
