= Araluen, New South Wales =

Araluen
- Town
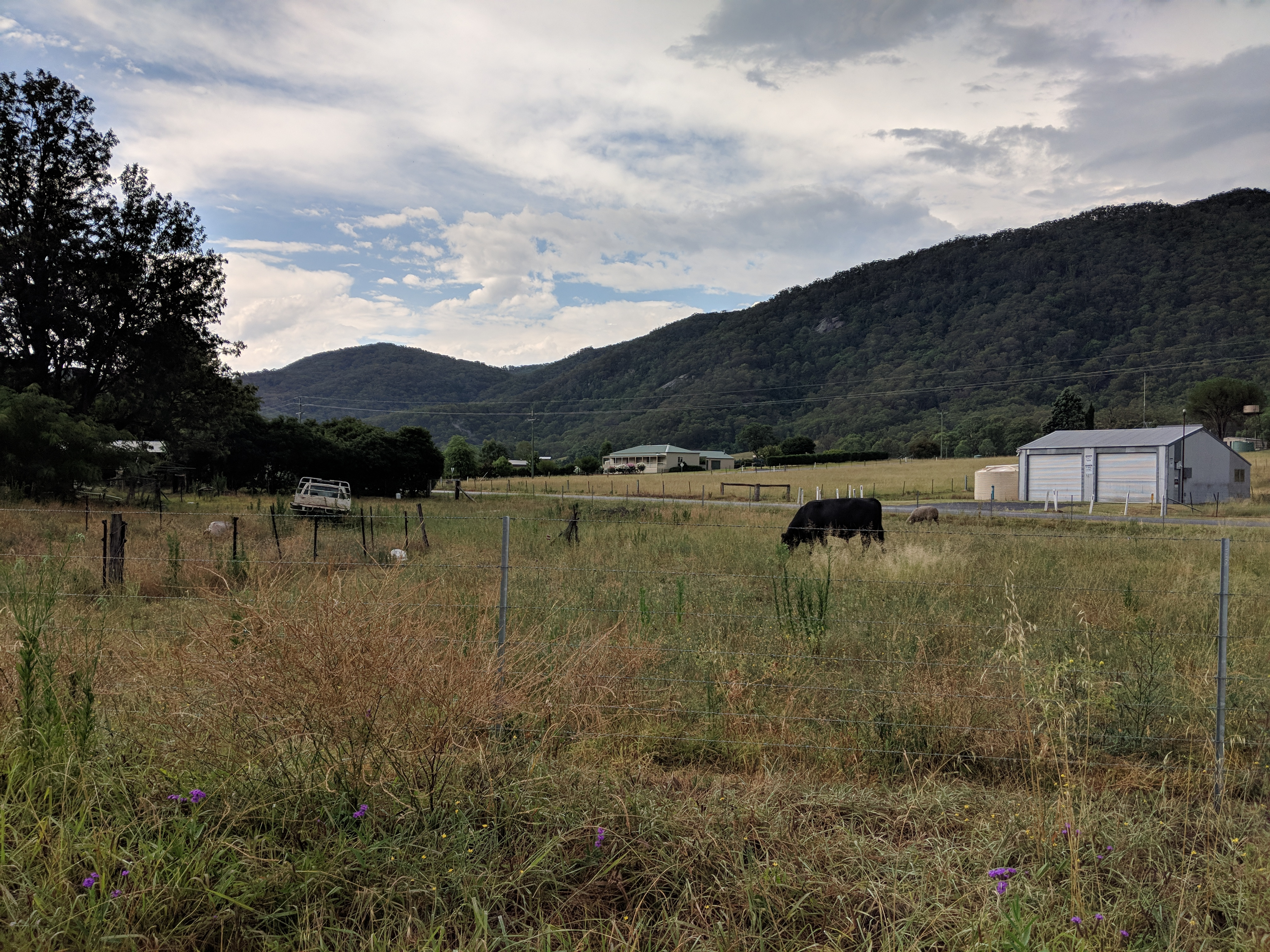

- Interactive map of Araluen
- Coordinates: 35°39′S 149°49′E
- Country: Australia
- State: New South Wales
- LGA: Queanbeyan-Palerang Regional Council
- Location: 23 km (14 mi) S of Braidwood; 235 km (146 mi) SSW of Sydney

Government
  - State electorate: Monaro
  - Federal division: Eden-Monaro
- Elevation: 160 m (520 ft)

Population
  - Total: 209 (2021 census)
- Postcode: 2622
- County: St Vincent
- Parish: Araluen
Localities around Araluen
Majors Creek	Reidsdale	Monga
Majors Creek	Araluen	Buckenbowra
Berlang	Neringla	Merricumbene

Araluen is a small town near Braidwood in the Southern Tablelands of New South Wales, Australia, in Queanbeyan-Palerang Regional Council. It lies in the valley of Araluen Creek, that joins the Deua River at roughly the midpoint in its course. At the 2021 census, Araluen had a population of 209 people.

== Etymology ==
The area now known as Araluen lies on the traditional lands of Walbanga people, a group of Yuin. The name 'Araluen' meant 'water lily' or 'place of the water lilies' in the local Aboriginal language.

== Gold mining ==
At the time of European settlement Araluen was described as a broad alluvial valley with many natural billabongs covered with water lilies. Unfortunately, no such billabongs exist in the Araluen valley today. The natural landscape of Araluen Creek and its valley were destroyed by rampant and extremely destructive alluvial gold mining during the 'gold rush' in the latter half of the 19th century.

By 1852, gold was being mined on Araluen Creek, around what is now Araluen. There were several mining villages in the area. Araluen experienced a great population increase during the gold rush. It experienced a decline after a flash flood in 1860 virtually destroyed the town, killing 24 people. Another flash flood came in March 2012 killing one person.

A 1874 account indicated the destructive impact:

On approaching Araluen affairs assume a more serious air. The change commences where the Sideling Gold Mining Company has erected its great waterwheel, and is at work reefing and ground sluicing. This is at a distance of seven miles from Araluen. The company consists of eight proprietors, who are sanguine. The particulars promised respecting this claim have not yet reached me. From this claim the indications of mining increase. The timber is more interfered with, races intersected the country everywhere, and patches of upturned country impart an air of desolation inseparable from mining industry. The Araluen Creek winds through an extensive valley 1200 feet above the sea level, and surrounded by ranges of mountains about two miles apart. The ranges attain an altitude of 1000 feet, are precipitous, and sparsely wooded to the summit. In this enclosure the shallow stream which now winds about, once swelled into a lagoon, and over the whole of the rocky bed formed a deposit which is now the object of search. This layer of "wash-dirt", which varies from four to thirty feet in depth, contains the gold. Near the creek it is easily reached, but away back it is covered with the tailings and débris of former diggers, that has to be removed. Further from the creek, therefore, the more stripping there is to deal with—16, 18, and 20 feet.

There was a revival of gold mining at Araluen in the first two decades of the 20th century, when the area was extensively mined using gold dredges, adding to damage to the landscape of earlier mining efforts. By the mid-1920s, dredging had ended. Over its years as a goldfield, Araluen produced in excess of £11,000,000 worth of gold.

After the years of gold mining, Araluen was renowned for its stone fruit, particularly its large, good tasting peaches.

== Facilities ==
It had various schools between 1867 and 1956. Araluen West Public School operated from 1867 to 1919, although it was called Bourketown Public School during its first two years. Araluen Upper Public School operated from 1872 to 1888. Araluen Lower Provisional School operated from 1943 to 1956. Araluen West Evening Public School operated from 1880 to 1886 and in 1890 and 1892. Araluen Evening Public School operated in 1880 and 1881.

The town was connected by road to Braidwood, via Majors Creek, from its earliest days. Those travelling from the coast went via Braidwood, either over the Clyde Road (from Nelligen on the Clyde River) or the Braidwood Road (from Nowra). From around 1858, packhorses were used to bring supplies from the coastal river town of Moruya. In 1867–1868, a road—Araluen Road—was built from Araluen to Moruya.

Two rare plants growing in the area are the Araluen gum (Eucalyptus kartzoffiana) and the Araluen zieria (Zieria adenophora).

== Residents ==
- Australian geologist Torrington Blatchford (1871–1938) was born in Araluen.
- Australian author Jackie French (1953–) lives in Araluen.
