= Zion Hill Mission =

Australian Lutheran mission

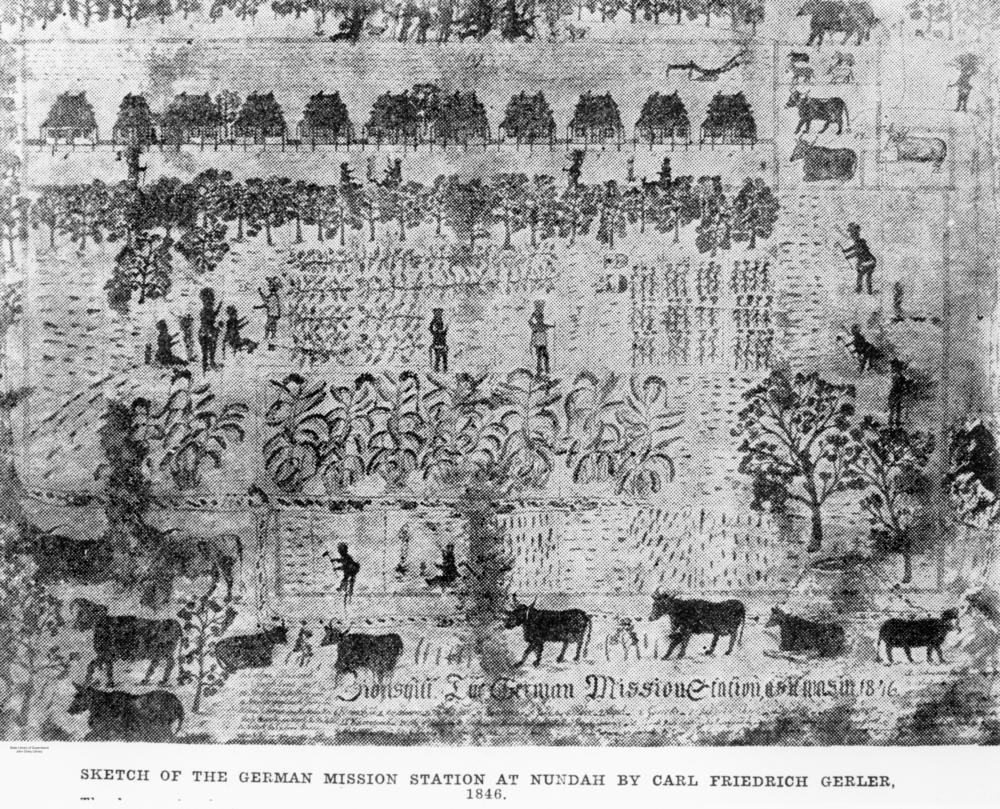
1846 sketch of the mission

The Zion Hill Mission was a Christian mission founded in the area now known as Nundah, Queensland by German Lutheran missionaries. The mission is notable as being the first free European settlement in what is now the state of Queensland. Despite limited success at converting the local Aboriginal Australians to Christianity, many of the missionaries later became pioneers and farmers in the district, shaping the social fabric of the northside area for decades to come.

== Foundation ==
The idea of establishing a Christian mission in the Moreton Bay district was the idea of John Dunmore Lang, who had ambitious plans to establish a series of missions along the Australian coast north of Sydney, ostensibly in order to bring Christianity to the Aboriginal peoples, but also to pacify them and prevent attacks on shipwrecked European sailors, as had happened in the case of the Stirling Castle incident some years prior. Lang justified the placement of the mission far from the main colonial settlement of Sydney to his superiors in Britain by asserting that "Aborigines of that distant portion of the colonial territory would be less contaminated by intercourse with the depraved convict population of the colony than those within the present limits of location."

At the time, the Moreton Bay region was still administered by New South Wales, as a "prison-within-a-prison" for particularly troublesome convicts. Private settlements by free Europeans was not permitted until 1839, and widespread free settlement by Europeans in the Moreton Bay region would not begin until 1840. The proposed mission would therefore be the first free (non-convict) European settlement in the area, although this went unremarked upon at the time, as the area was still a part of the colony of New South Wales.

Although Lang was a controversial figure within New South Wales at the time, he did manage to convince the colonial government to reserve 650 acres (2.6 km^{2}) of land for the missionaries' efforts, seven miles (11 km) north of the settlement at Eagle Farm. Lang was also able to recruit Carl Wilhelm Schmidt and Christopher Eipper, two ordained ministers of German origin who had joined Lang's Australian Presbyterian synod, to lead the mission. He was also able to secure a grant of £450 from the British government, as well as a further £150 from his brother, to finance the expedition. It is likely that Lang borrowed even more money for the project, as £600 would not have been enough to arrange the passage of twenty people, and he remarked in 1839 that he still owed £350 in establishment costs for the mission.

== The missionaries arrive ==
The following missionaries arrived at the site:

- Reverend Carl Wilhelm Schmidt
- Reverend Christopher Eipper
- Peter Niquet (also sometimes spelled Niqué), mason
- August Rode (also sometimes spelled Rodé), cabinet maker
- Johann Leopold Zillmann, blacksmith
- Gottfried Hausmann (later also known as Godfrey Haussmann), farmer
- Wilhelm Hartenstein, weaver
- Carl Theodor Franz, tailor
- Gottfried Wagner (later also known as Godfrey Wagner), shoemaker
- August Albrecht, shoemaker
- Ludwig Döge, gardener

In addition to the above, Moritz Schneider was included in the initial party, but died in quarantine in Sydney in 1838 of typhoid. His occupation was listed as "medical missionary". Two further missionaries arrived in 1844, Carl Friedrich Gerler, and J.W. Gericke.

At first, the local Aboriginal peoples were curious about the mission and attended services, despite the language barrier that existed. While they had learned some English from the nearby Moreton Bay settlement, most of the missionaries spoke only German. The missionaries tried to engage Aboriginal peoples in constructing buildings and digging gardens to form a bond with them and recognize a benefit enticement from a nomadic life to being settled. However, the curiosity of Aboriginal peoples waned with decreased interest in the sermons and attendance at the mission services. An ongoing problem was that during services the gardens were left unattended and thefts occurred. The missionaries responses to them, soon began to harden attitudes on both sides.

The mission was visited in 1843 by explorer Ludwig Leichhardt, who responded to those dismissive of the mission by saying: "The missionaries have converted no black-fellows to Christianity; but they have commenced a friendly intercourse with these savage children of the bush, and they have shewn to them the white fellow in his best colour. They did not take their wives; they did not take bloody revenge when the black fellow came to rob their garden. They were always kind, perhaps too kind; for they threatened without executing their threatenings, and the black-fellows knew well that it was only gammon."

== Decline ==
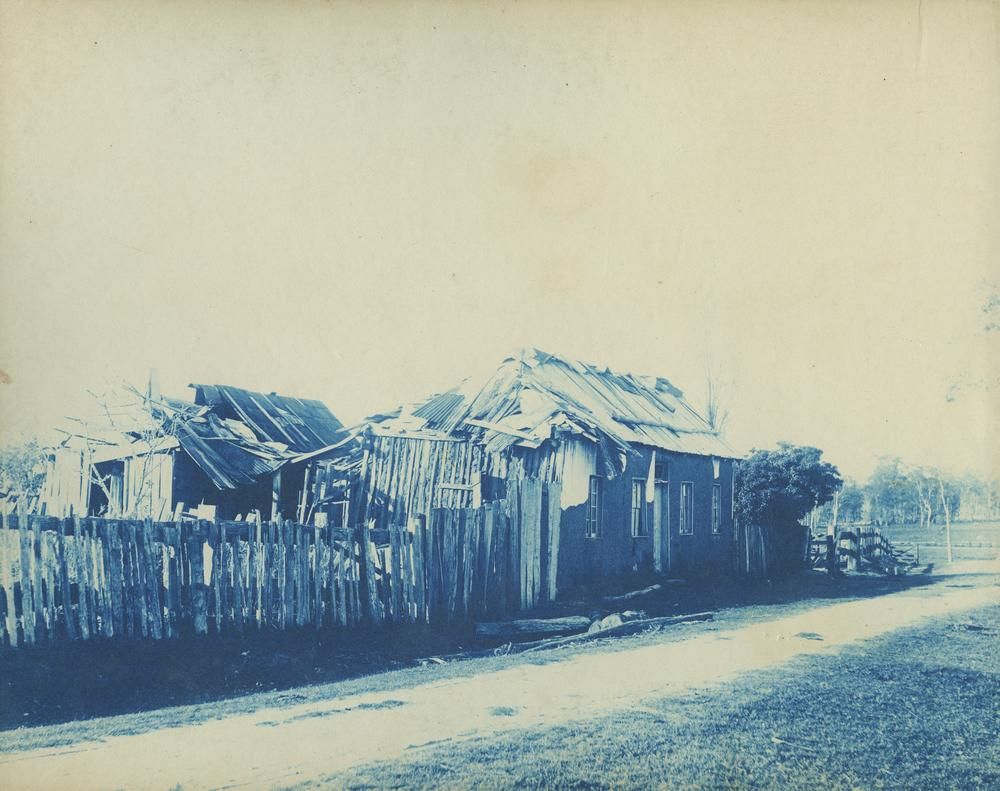
The last remaining cottages of the mission, circa 1895.

By 1843, it was becoming apparent that the mission was in trouble. Governor George Gipps, who had visited the area in 1842, had indicated to the missionaries that to continue receiving government funding, they would need to move their mission to a new site, further away from Brisbane. This request was likely because newly arrived free settlers in the area were beginning to resent the generous allotment of land that had been allocated to the mission. Eipper and Schmidt therefore undertook a survey of surrounding areas looking for a site to move the mission to, considering areas including the Bunya Mountains and around Wide Bay.

During this expedition, Schmidt uncovered evidence that squatters living beyond the authorised settlement line were involved in poisoning Aborigininal Australian peoples, particularly in the area around the modern-day town of Kilcoy. Schmidt advised Lang of his findings, which were subsequently published in the Colonial Observer in Sydney, sparking off a major scandal.

Upon Eipper and Schmidt's return, they presented a proposal to the Sydney-based organising committee, recommending that the mission be moved. However, frustrated by dwindling funds, increased public opposition, and the fact that the government had decided to stop funding the enterprise, the committee instead decided to terminate the mission.

== Legacy ==
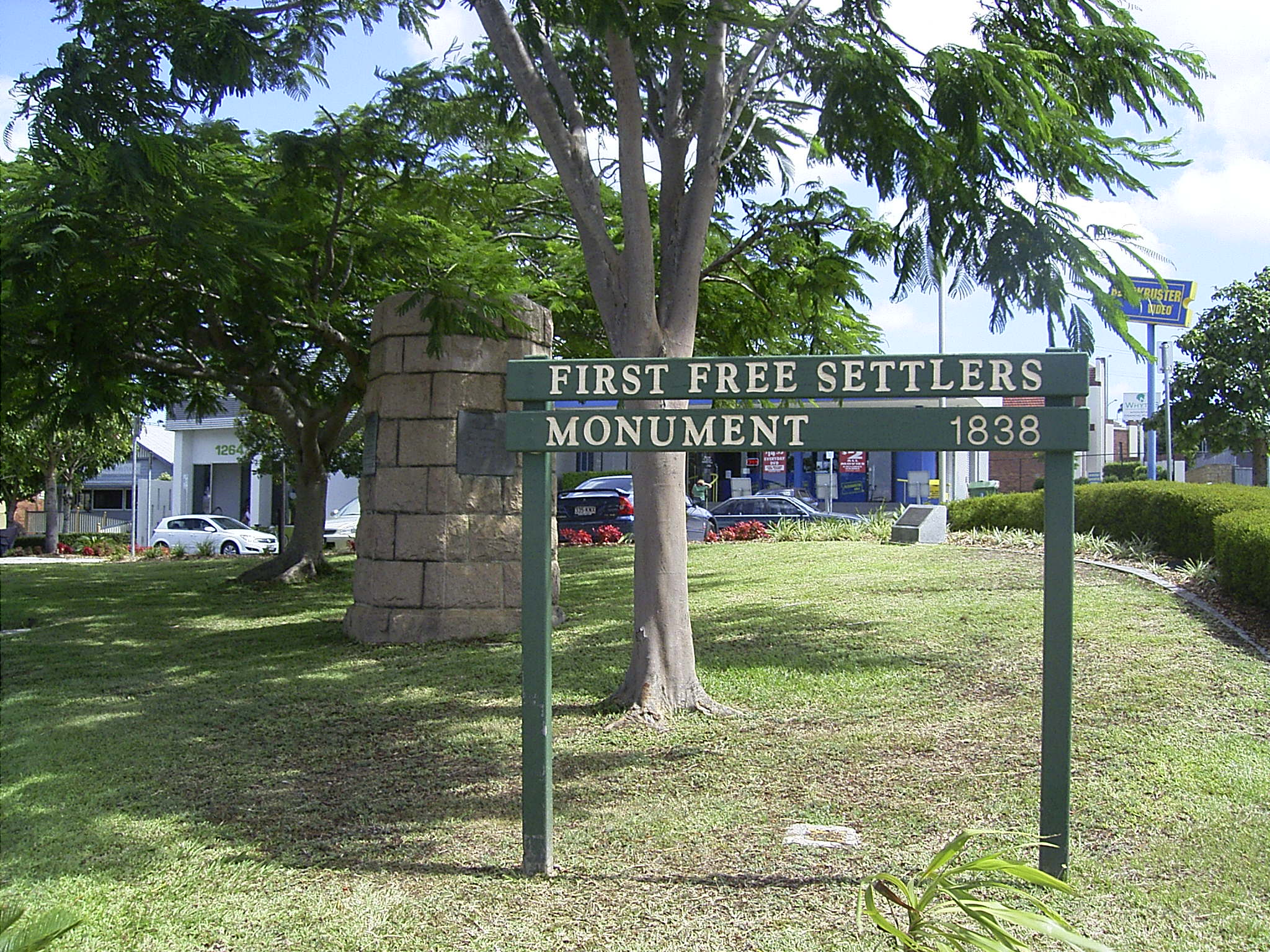
This monument in modern-day Nundah commemorates the Zion Hill settlers.

Despite the failure of the missionaries to convert the local indigenous people to Christianity, the work done by the missionaries in establishing a settlement proved that free settlement was possible in the area, and they had a strong effect on the social character of the rapid expansion of the colony that followed the closure of the mission.

Many places in North Brisbane are named after the missionaries. The suburb of Zillmere was named after Zillmann, as were the Zillmann's Waterholes, a watercourse near the former site of the mission that flows into Downfall Creek. Zillman Road, Gerler Road, and Rode Road are all major roads in the north of Brisbane named after members of the missionary party. An obelisk was also erected in 1938 in Nundah to commemorate the centenary of the settlement.
