= Mill Complex, Braidwood =

Mill Complex
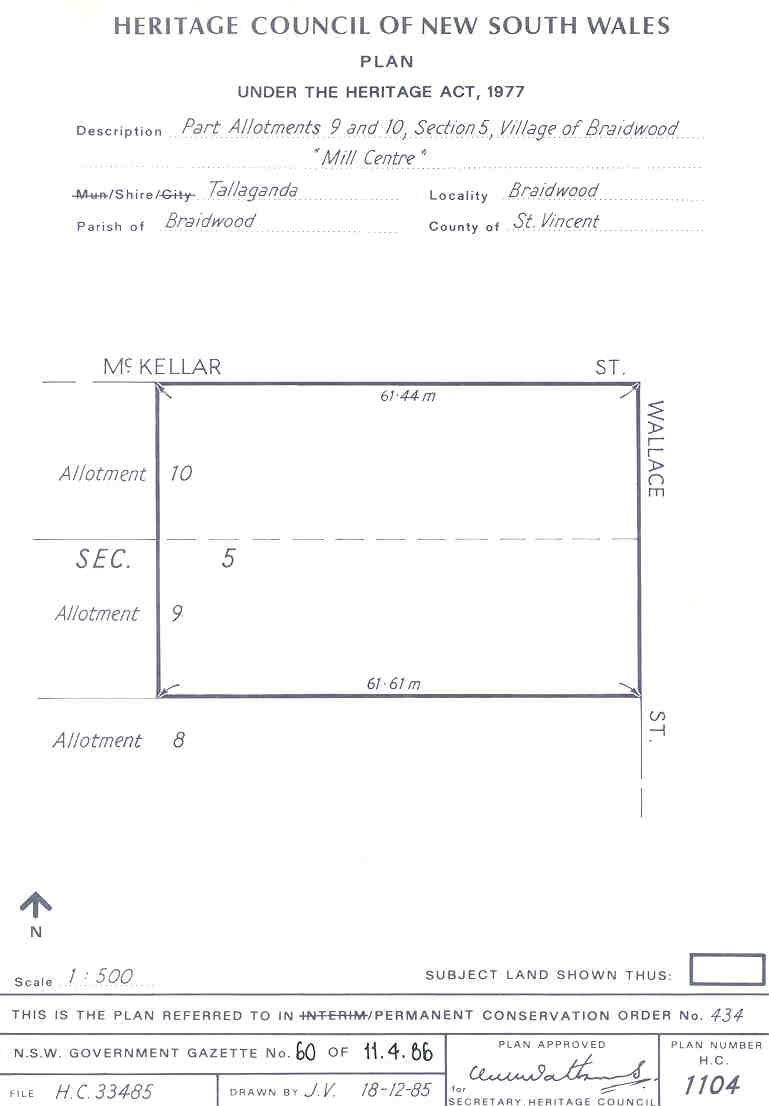
- Heritage boundaries

- Location within New South Wales Location within Australia
- 35.4400°S 149.7999°E
- Location: Wallace Street, Braidwood, Queanbeyan-Palerang Region, New South Wales, Australia

Site notes
- Owner: Royds Pty Ltd

New South Wales Heritage Register
- Official name: Mill Centre
- Type: state heritage (built)
- Designated: 2 April 1999
- Reference no.: 434
- Type: historic site

The Mill Complex is a heritage-listed historic site at Wallace Street, Braidwood, Queanbeyan-Palerang Region, New South Wales, Australia. It was formerly known as the Mill Centre. It was added to the New South Wales State Heritage Register on 2 April 1999.

== History ==
The corner building (198–200 Wallace Street) was built in 1839 as a shop for Hendricks & Jacobs, who operated the Old Post Office Stores. A verandah was later removed. A garage extension to the south was built in 1929.

19 McKellar Street was built as two shops known as the Albert Buildings in 1859. It was converted to a steam-driven flour mill in the 1860s. It was later used as a store.

== Description ==
The Mill Complex consists of several buildings of heritage interest.

A two-storey commercial building in Victorian Georgian style extends along the Wallace Street frontage. It has a single-storey timber-framed veranda and ogee profiles roof. The columns are flat profile of Tuscan. The windows are twelve-pane sliding ash windows with implied flat arch elements articulated above each opening in the stucco. The ground floor street-facing windows are larger, as befitted a late Georgian period shop. The veranda flooring is paved with sandstone flagstones. The corrugated steel roof is hipped with a valley in between two shops. The interior has possibly original wide floor boards, butt jointed. Some original shellac timber joinery remains such as architraves.

The "old post office cottage" is a single-storey building constructed of bagged brick work and corrugated steel roofing with two parallel gables facing McKellar Street. The windows appear to be taken from other buildings and each is typical of a different decade 1860s - 1920s. The western facade has been altered to suit a dwelling use.

A mill building is on the adjacent site facing McKellar Street. It is a two-storey rectangular prism with a hip roof of short length corrugated steel sheets. The walls are load-bearing rubble granite laid in bands as a form of coursing. The first floor has a series of twelve-paned timber sash windows. The ground floor north elevation has been changed several times, apparently soon after construction. Large archways on either side of the north elevation were filled in, and the windows added later. Several small doorways at the middle have been filled in and a later opening with a hardwood lintel was inserted. Apparently the large archways caused the building to become unstable, because a large buttressing mass of granite was constructed alongside the eastern wall. The east and west wall have no openings. The interior is one space with apparent remains of heavy timber galleries constructed to access the higher parts of the milling machinery. The building was used as a function centre in the early twenty-first century.

== Heritage listing ==
Mill Centre was listed on the New South Wales State Heritage Register on 2 April 1999.
