= Ballalaba =

- Town
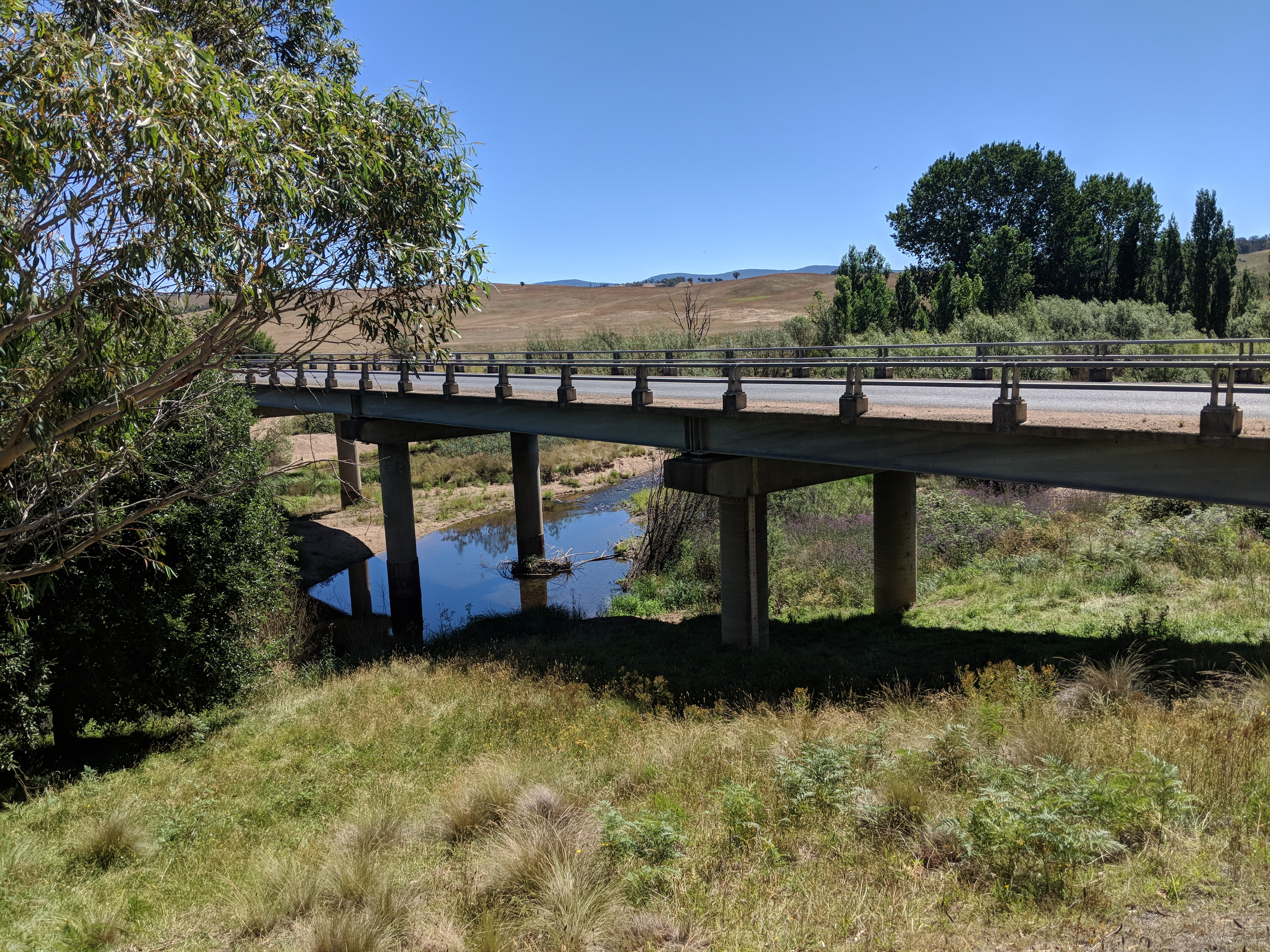
- Ballalaba bridge over the Shoalhaven River

- Coordinates: 35°35′57″S 149°38′02″E
- Country: Australia
- State: New South Wales
- Region: Southern Tablelands
- LGA: Queanbeyan-Palerang Regional Council
- Location: 30 km (19 mi) SW of Braidwood; 90 km (56 mi) SE of Canberra; 94 km (58 mi) W of Batemans Bay; 316 km (196 mi) SW of Sydney

Government
  - State electorate: Monaro
  - Federal division: Eden-Monaro
- Elevation: 712 m (2,336 ft)

Population
  - Total: 29 (2021 census)
- Postcode: 2622
- County: St Vincent
- Parish: Bendoura
Localities around Ballalaba
Harolds Cross	Bendoura	Majors Creek
Kindervale	Ballalaba	Majors Creek
Jerrabattgulla	Krawarree	Berlang

Ballalaba is a locality in the Queanbeyan–Palerang Regional Council, New South Wales, Australia. It is located about 30 km southwest of Braidwood on the road to Cooma and on the Shoalhaven River. At the 2021 census, it had a population of 29. It had a "half-time" school from 1867 to 1870; from 1879 to 1940, it operated either as a "provisional" or a "half-time" school".
