= Bendoura =

- Town
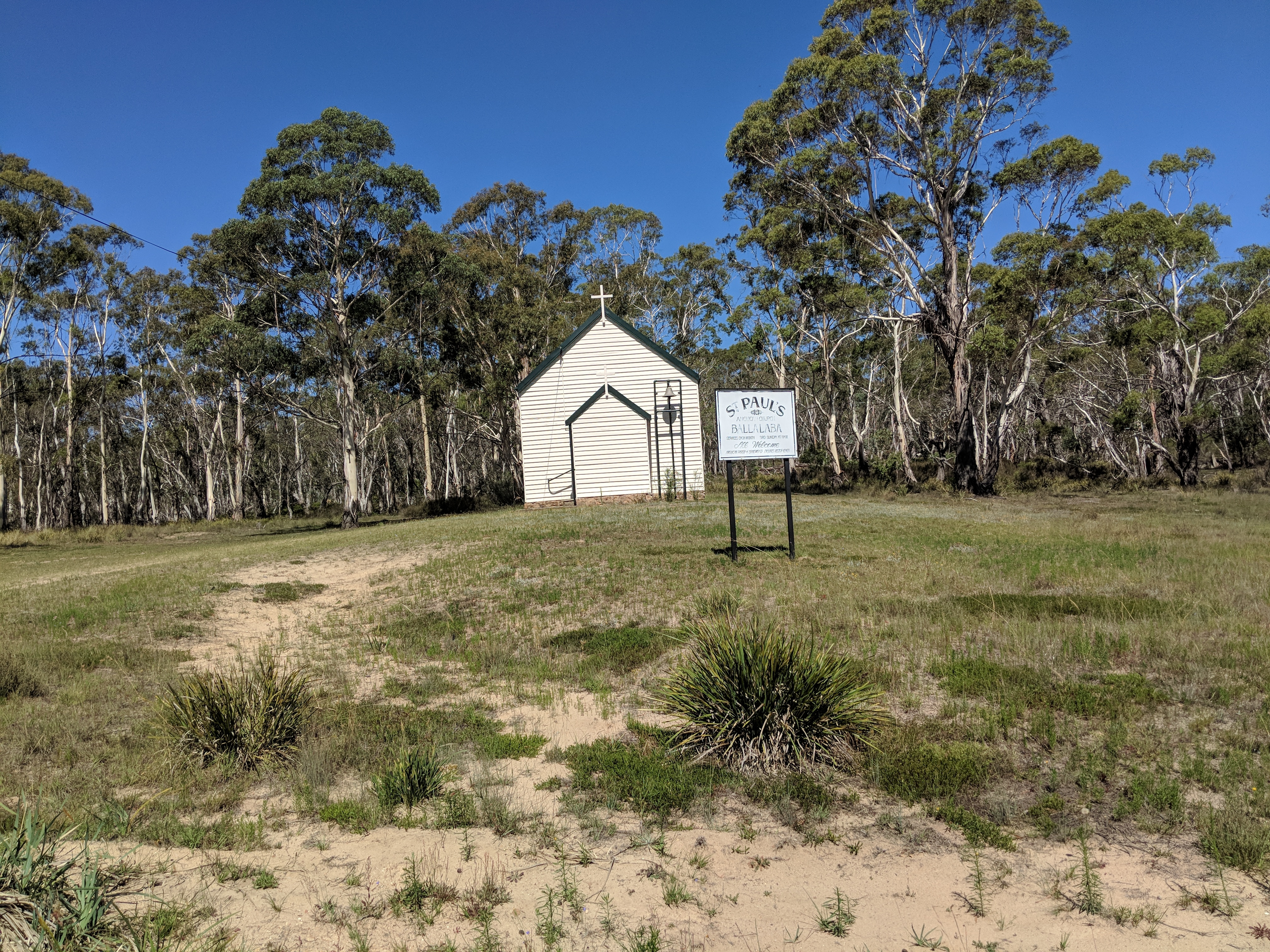
- St Paul's Anglican church

- Coordinates: 35°31′57″S 149°40′02″E
- Country: Australia
- State: New South Wales
- Region: Southern Tablelands
- LGA: Queanbeyan-Palerang Regional Council
- Location: 21 km (13 mi) SW of Braidwood; 107 km (66 mi) SE of Canberra; 93 km (58 mi) ESE of Queanbeyan; 80 km (50 mi) W of Batemans Bay; 302 km (188 mi) SW of Sydney

Government
  - State electorate: Monaro
  - Federal division: Eden-Monaro
- Elevation: 667 m (2,188 ft)

Population
  - Total: 108 (2021 census)
- Postcode: 2622
- County: St Vincent
- Parish: Bendoura
Localities around Bendoura
Bombay	Braidwood	Jembaicumbene
Farringdon	Bendoura	Majors Creek
Harolds Cross	Ballalaba	Majors Creek

Bendoura is a locality in the Queanbeyan–Palerang Regional Council, New South Wales, Australia. It is located about 20 km southwest of Braidwood on the road to Cooma and on the eastern bank of the Shoalhaven River. At the 2021 census, it had a population of 108.
