= Christopher Eipper =

German missionary (1813–1894)

Christoph Eipper
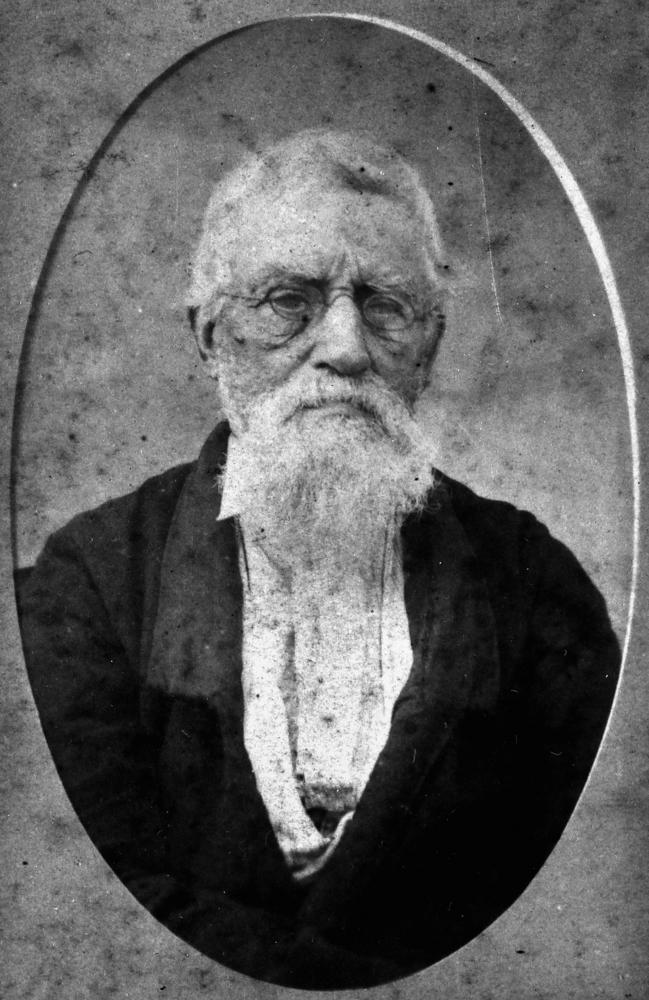
- Christoph Eipper, missionary to the aborigines at Moreton Bay.
- Born: 20 August 1813; Esslingen, Württemberg, Germany
- Died: 2 September 1894 (age 81); Durran Durra, Braidwood, New South Wales, Australia
- Occupations: Missionary to the aborigines, then Presbyterian minister and then teacher for the Commonwealth of Australia
- Spouse: Harriet Gyles
- Parents: Georg Christoph Eipper (father); Sophie Juliane Schaettler (mother)

Christoph Eipper (20 August 1813 – 2 September 1894) was a pioneering missionary and Presbyterian minister in Australia.

== Biography ==
Christoph Eipper was born to Georg Christoph Eipper and Sophie Juliane Schaettler in Esslingen, Württemberg, Germany. He was the twelfth of fourteen children, eight of which were from his father's previous marriages to Maria Catharina Blankenhorn and Elisabetha Dorothea Ohnmaiss. He studied at the institutions of the Basle Missionary Society, Switzerland, in 1832–36, and of the Church Missionary Society at Islington in 1836. However, despite having received financial support from the Church Missionary Society on condition of accepting Church of England ordination, he and his German colleague Gottlieb Schreiner, father of the novelist Olive Schreiner, refused episcopal ordination because they would not submit to vows of unlimited obedience to a bishop, although they were prepared to receive Lutheran ordination. They consequently ceased their connexion with the Basle Committee. Eipper, together with Schreiner, applied in March 1837 to Rev. John Dunmore Lang for appointment as missionaries to the Aboriginals at Moreton Bay. Schreiner decided to go to South Africa, but Eipper was accepted, together with a party of missionaries under the pastoral care of Rev. Carl Wilhelm Schmidt. On 15 June 1837 at Shoreditch, London, Eipper married Harriet, daughter of John Gyles, a former missionary agriculturist at Tahiti; they had five sons and four daughters. On 27 June he was ordained at an Evangelical service by German and French Protestant clergy resident in London. The united mission party arrived in Sydney in the Minerva in January 1838. Schmidt and Eipper were admitted as members of Lang's Presbyterian Synod of New South Wales on 15 March 1838, and were delegated to form a presbytery of Moreton Bay. Eipper and fourteen others of the party sailed to Moreton Bay in the government schooner Isabella in March 1838 and, on the recommendation of the commandant, Major (Sir) Sydney Cotton, selected a site about seven miles (11 km) from Eagle Farm which they named Zion Hill. Classes were conducted by Eipper, and Rev. J. C. S. Handt helped the newcomers to acquire the Aboriginal dialect.

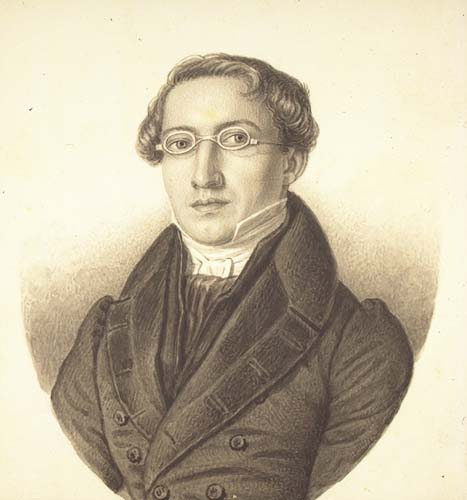
Eipper aged 23 in 1836.

== Missionary work ==
The early history of the mission was first recorded by Eipper in his Statement of the Origin, Condition, and Prospects of the German Mission to the Aborigines at Moreton Bay (Sydney, 1841). Apart from the routine work, Eipper also travelled among the Aboriginals. When instructed that a new site for a mission was necessary the two ordained missionaries tried to find a suitable place in the Wide Bay district. In March 1843 Eipper joined Dr Stephen Simpson, acting administrator, in an expedition into this district, which Schmidt had already penetrated.

Eipper kept a detailed journal of the expedition, which reached the Mary River on 1 April. In July 1843 Schmidt and Eipper jointly reported to the Sydney committee of the Society in Aid of the German Mission to the Aborigines, and again in September, but in October the Sydney society decided to abandon the mission. Eipper approached the Church Missionary Society in London saying that he believed he had been wrong in refusing episcopal ordination and offering to serve in New Zealand or in India. He was conditionally offered the position of master of an English school in India. However, after remaining for a while with the lay missionaries, who proposed to support themselves by manual labour, Eipper was received by the Synod of Australia in connection with the Established Church of Scotland on 5 October 1843. He was Presbyterian minister at Braidwood, New South Wales 1844–46, at Strath Allan and district 1846 without state stipend, and at Paterson late 1847-February 1850.

== Marriages and children ==
Christoph Eipper married Harriet Gyles on 15 June 1837 in Saint Leonards, Shoreditch, London, England. He was 23 and she was 22. They had eight children together:

- Maria Jane Eipper (1839–1930)
- John William Christopher Eipper (1840–1905), editor of the Maitland Mercury newspaper.
- Sarah Harriet Louisa Eipper (1842–1844), died young.
- Sophia Matilda Eipper (1843–1915), married William Ralph Hush, grandson of Ralph Hush, in 1865 in Braidwood.
- George Hugh Coghill Eipper (1845–1895), married Louisa Beck in 1877 in Sydney.
- Frank Ross Eipper (1847–1942), married Maud Campbell in Singleton, New South Wales, then Leila Sarah Ayling in Newtown, New South Wales.
- Albert Edward James Eipper (1849–1925), married Mary Johnston Allen in 1878 in Scone.
- Samuel Frederick Eipper (1852–1935), married Eliza Hannah Ayling in 1880 in Scone.

Christoph and Harriet had 38 grandchildren.

== Later life and death ==
In 1851 he retired from the ministry. Bridges' assessment is that he was not successful as a missionary or a minister. Eipper later held several teaching positions at Muswellbrook and Aberdeen. He died at Charleyong, now known as Marlowe in the Braidwood district on 2 September 1894. His eldest son, J. W. Christopher (1840–1905), was editor of the Maitland Mercury. One grandson, Rev. Albert James, became a noted Presbyterian missionary to the Aboriginals at Broome and Thursday Island. His other sons were pioneers in the Scone, Tomalla and Warrah districts. He is the great-grandfather of Sir John Cornforth

== Bibliography ==
- Historical Records of Australia, Series I, vols 19–20; J. D. Lang.
- An Appeal to Friends of Missions, on Behalf of German Mission to Aborigines of New South Wales (Syd, 1839); H. J. J. Sparks.
- Queensland's First Free Settlement 1838-1938 (Brisb, 1938); W. N. Gunson, 'The Nundah Missionaries'
- Journal (Royal Historical Society of Queensland), vol 6, no 3, 1960–61, pp 511–39; CSO, 1837, A1276, p 27 (State Library of New South Wales); Eipper papers (copy, National Library of Australia).
- B.J.Bridges, Ministers, Licentiates and Catrechists of the Presbyterian Churches in New South Wales 1823-65 (Melbourne: Rowland S. Ward, 1989), pp 35–36.
