= Braidwood Central School =

School in Australia

Coordinates: 35.4408°S 149.7982°E

Location
- 46 Wilson St; Braidwood, NSW 2622, Australia

Information
- Former names: Braidwood School for Boys and Girls Braidwood National School Braidwood Superior Central School Braidwood Public School
- Motto: Loyalty and Truth
- Established: 1849
- Website: braidwood-c.schools.nsw.gov.au

Braidwood Central School is a government-funded co-educational primary and secondary school located in Braidwood, New South Wales, Australia. Established in 1849, the school is one of the oldest continuously operating schools in the state.

Parts of the school are listed on the New South Wales State Heritage Register, under the item "Braidwood and its Setting".

== History ==
Prior to the establishment of Braidwood Central School, a school was operated privately by James Sproul, with 35 students in attendance.

Braidwood Central School was officially opened on 7 August 1849, under the name 'Braidwood School for Boys and Girls'. In 1850, the school was granted one acre for a building, used today for primary and secondary classes. In 1869, the school was split into two departments, Primary and Secondary, with another two rooms added in 1870. In 1877, a teacher's lodge was constructed, which now functions as an office and archive. The school was renamed Braidwood Superior School in 1888.

In 1920, the school was renamed once again to Braidwood Public School, before becoming Braidwood Central School in 1949.

In 2000, despite being one of the smallest state secondary schools in New South Wales, Braidwood Central was awarded one of four national prizes in the student section of the 2000 Silk Cut Award for Linocut Printing. Braidwood was the only public school to win one of the awards.

The school gymnasium was upgraded in 2013 with the addition of a large kitchen to be used as a training facility for hospitality students at the school and also to host community events, and provide support for emergency evacuation for up to 500 people.

In November 2021, construction was completed on three new buildings, comprising an administrative expansion of the former teacher's lodge and two multi-function classroom blocks. The project was designed by architect Clarke Keller and built by Zauner Construction. The $16.4 million upgrade was officially opened on 2 February 2022.

== Administration ==
In 2024, Braidwood Central School had 338 students across kindergarten to Year 12, with 32 teaching staff. Of the total student body, 4% of the students identified as Indigenous Australians.

All Year 12 students who graduated in 2024 completed and received the Higher School Certificate, with 42.86% also completing vocational or tertiary training during as part of or accompanying their studies.

== See also ==
- History of Braidwood, New South Wales
