= Albion Hotel, Braidwood =

Albion Hotel
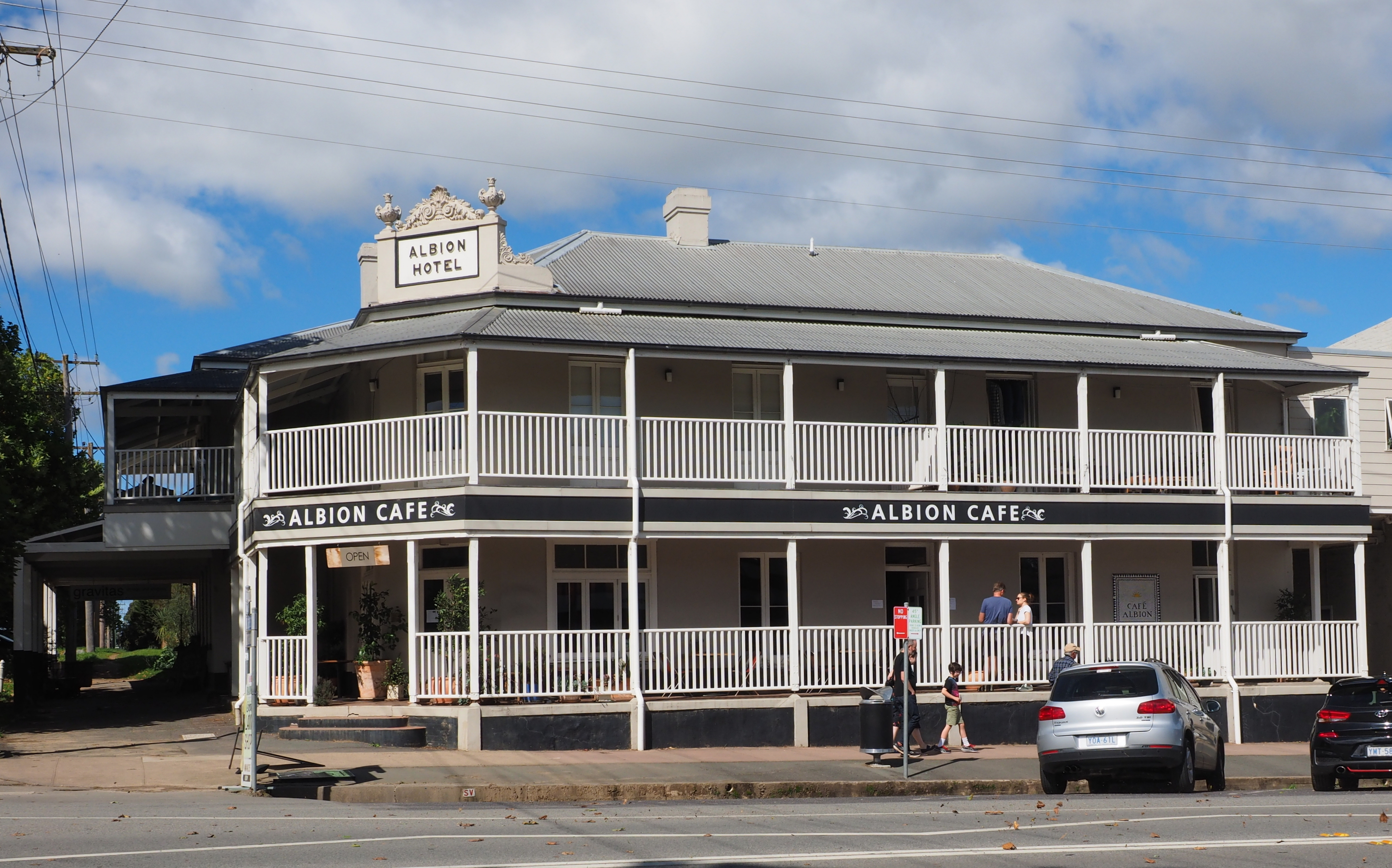
- The Albion Hotel building in 2022

- Location within New South Wales Location within Australia
- 35.4443°S 149.8000°E
- Location: 119 Wallace Street, Braidwood, Queanbeyan-Palerang Region, New South Wales, Australia

History
- Built: 1872–

Site notes
- Owner: Elders Relad Estate

New South Wales Heritage Register
- Official name: Albion Hotel, 3 adjoining shops & stables
- Type: state heritage (complex / group)
- Designated: 2 April 1999
- Reference no.: 304
- Type: Hotel
- Category: Commercial

Albion Hotel is a heritage-listed former hotel in the New South Wales Southern Tablelands at 119 Wallace Street, Braidwood in Australia. It was built from c. 1872. The complex also includes three adjoining shops and the stables. It was added to the New South Wales State Heritage Register on 2 April 1999.

== History ==
The hotel was built c. 1872. The Albion Hotel was reported to have been Braidwood's "leading hotel" and to have held "grand and boisterous parties" in its heyday. It was also a stop on the Cobb and Co route.

In 1884, the building's new verandah was swept away by a tornado.

The adjoining shops were built in the 1920s.

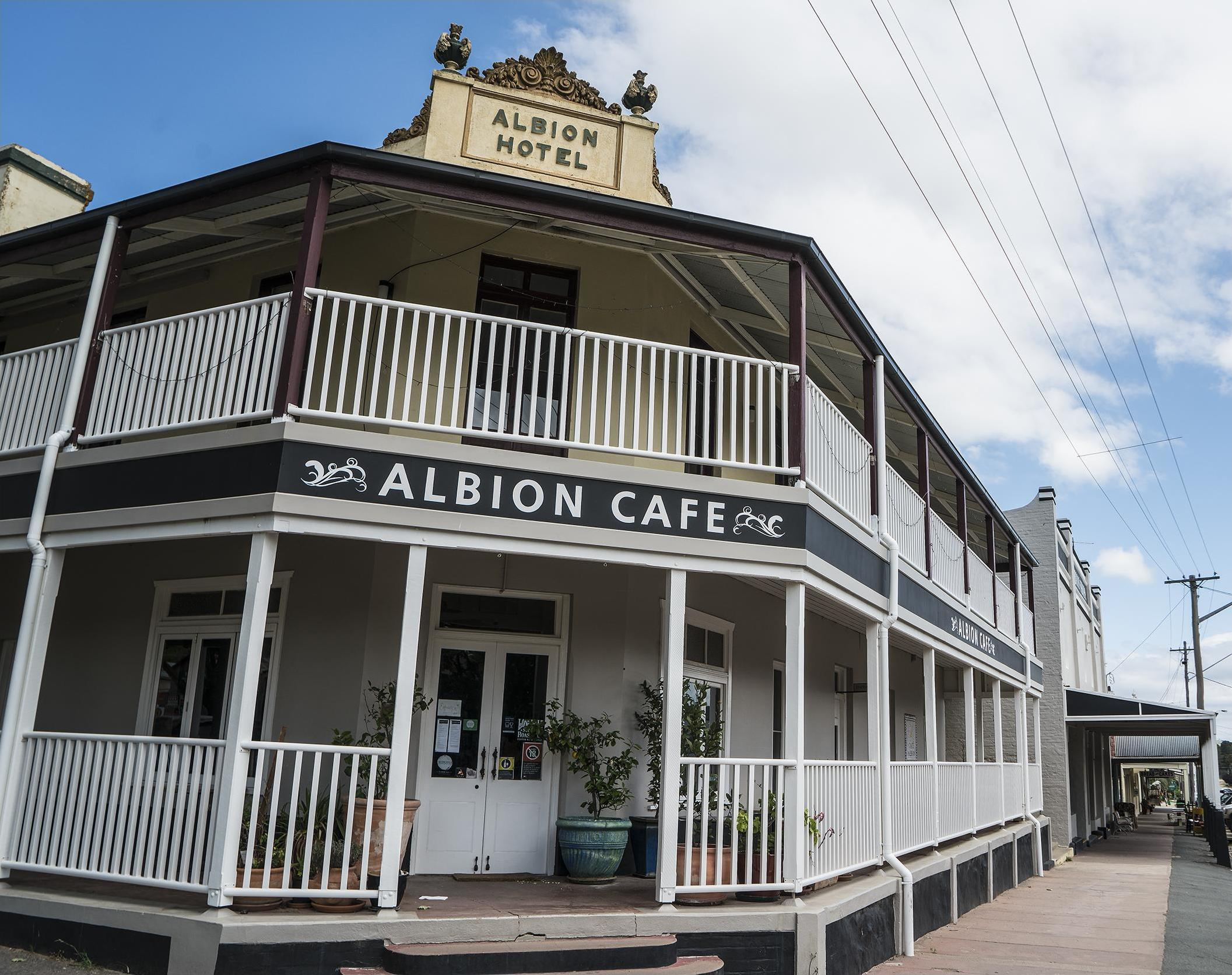
The entrance to the Albion Cafe in 2017

By the 1930s, the hotel was struggling and had become dated. It had no septic system or hot water service, unlike its competition, and its final licensee suggested that "there was very little call for second-class accommodation". It was reported that the hotel accommodation was full only about twice a year and "very infrequently" more than half full.

The hotel closed in April 1933, when the licensee surrendered the license after being unable to afford £1600 in repairs that had been ordered by the Licensee Court two and a half years prior. On the last day of trading, Saturday 29 April, the hotel was reported to have "gone out in a blaze of glory", with large crowds turning out to farewell the venue and free drinks for the last half hour. The licensee subsequently took over the lease of the Royal Hotel.

It was converted to a general store during the 1940s. In the early 1950s, the verandah posts were removed and replaced with a cantilevered awning, but the posts were shortly reinstated after issues with the awning. The reinstated posts were declared a "traffic hazard" in the 1960s, resulting in a community campaign to save the building's verandah.

It was restored in the early 1980s with a $40,000 heritage grant towards the facade and verandahs, and converted into seven retail shops and five apartments.

The Albion Cafe now operates out of the former hotel premises.

The former hotel featured in the films The Year My Voice Broke and Ned Kelly.

== Description ==
Hotel (c. 1872)

Two-storey rendered brickwork hotel with two-storey timber veranda facing Wallace Street, Braidwood's main street, and Duncan Street, a side street. The corner splay parapet is decorated in stucco with urns, volutes and "ALBION HOTEL". The external masonry is otherwise undecorated. The two-storied veranda appears to be a partial reconstruction. The columns and beams are stop chamfered in a traditional Victorian manner. The balustrading is also timber in an "X" pattern. The chimney and many openings appear to be original. The interior contains original mantelpieces and timber architraves.

Windows and doors with rippled glass appear to have been replaced in the 1920s.

Several internal walls were removed from the ground floor bar area - the remaining structure is supported on steel beams and a column.

The ground floor has an operating cafe and other shops. The first floor has three residential flats. A fourth residential flat is on the ground floor behind the street front. The hotel roof is corrugated metal.

Shops (c. 1920s)

Three brick shops of two storeys facing Wallace Street are in Federation style are linked to the hotel by a first floor timber walkway. These shops are typical of c. 1920 construction. The shopfronts are original to this period. They have single-storey verandas of timber framing on concrete bases and fibre cement valences. Inside, the shops retain some pressed metal ceilings, cornices and rendered brick wall surfaces. The first floor above the shops has two residential flats.

Stables

A sandstock brick stables with gabled hay loft faces the side Duncan Street boundary. It is typical of c. 1870s stables. It was constructed on a rubble granite base. The softer bricks have deteriorated somewhat. The windows and doors appear to be original. Windows have flat arch brickwork with bricks rubbed to fit. The roof is corrugated steel.

Shed

A corrugated steel shed clad in characteristic short lengths was constructed in the rear of the hotel, possibly around the turn of the twentieth century. The door has a sculpted sandstone threshold, evidently reused from another project.

== Heritage listing ==
Albion Hotel was listed on the New South Wales State Heritage Register on 2 April 1999.
