= Wyanbene Caves =

Caves in New South Wales, Australia

Coordinates: 35°47′42″S 149°41′00″E

Wyanbene is a geographic area between Braidwood and Cooma in Southern New South Wales, Australia. It includes a significant cave system and is adjacent to Deua National Park. The cave is at 35°47'42.25"S 149°40'56.48"E, at about 850 m altitude. A sheep and cattle farming area, there is still a lot of wildlife including wombats, greater gliders, wedge-tailed eagle, echidna, eastern grey kangaroo, wallabies, red-bellied black snakes, tiger snake, and Cunningham's spiny-tailed skink. There are also platypus and native fish in the Wyanbene Creek and nearby Shoalhaven and Deua rivers.
