= Braidwood District Historical Society Museum =

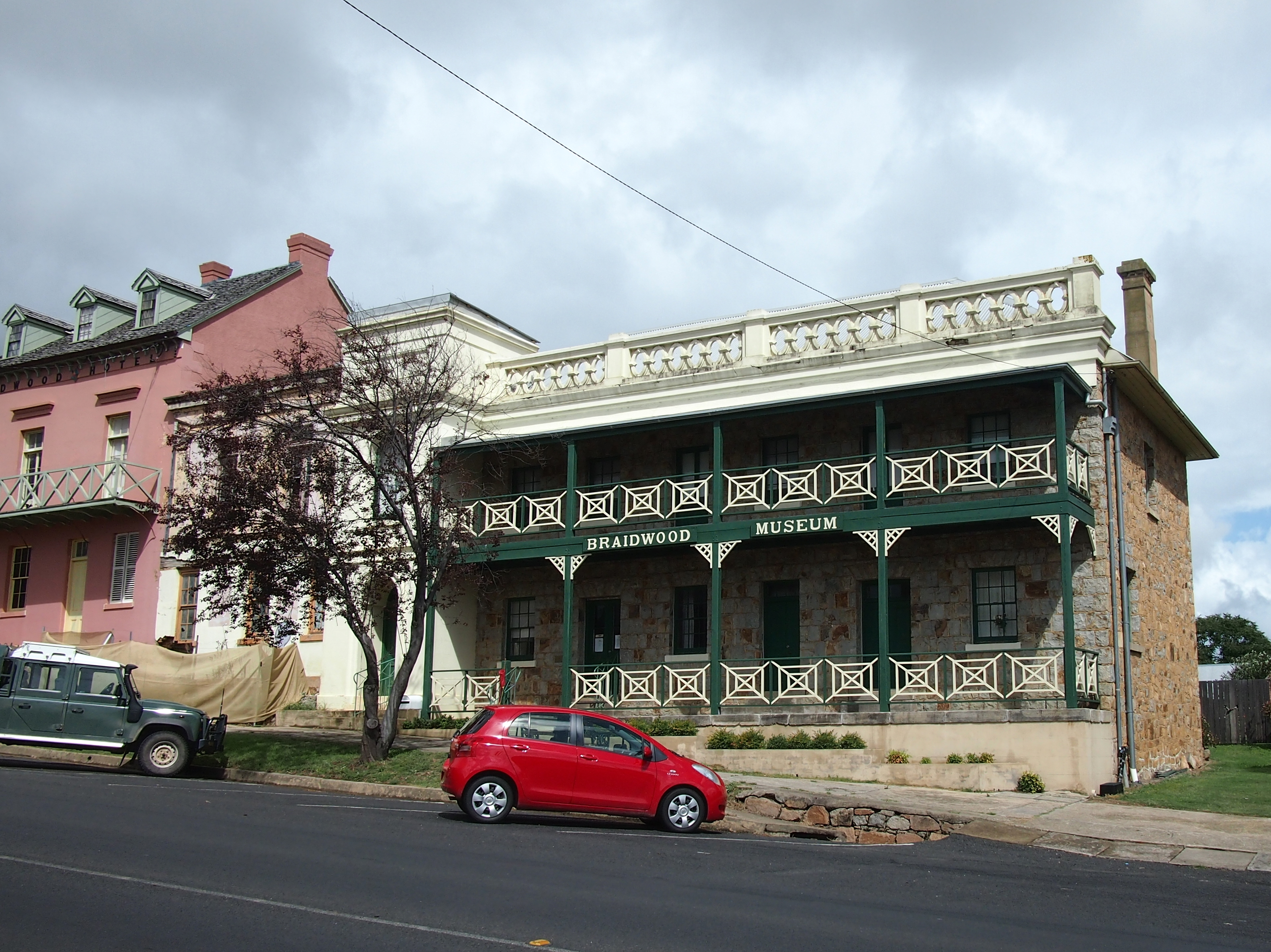
- Braidwood Museum, 2013

- Location within New South Wales Location within Australia
- 35.4404°S 149.7995°E
- Location: Wallace Street, Braidwood, Queanbeyan-Palerang Region, New South Wales, Australia

Site notes
- Owner: Braidwood Historical Society

New South Wales Heritage Register
- Official name: Braidwood District Historical Society Museum
- Type: state heritage (built)
- Designated: 2 April 1999
- Reference no.: 149
- Type: House
- Category: Residential buildings (private)

Braidwood District Historical Society Museum is a heritage-listed former hotel and Oddfellows Hall and now museum located on Wallace Street, Braidwood, in the Southern Tablelands region of New South Wales, Australia. The property is owned by Braidwood Historical Society. It was added to the New South Wales State Heritage Register on 2 April 1999.

== History ==
The building was built in the 1840s as the original Royal Hotel, by colonial surveyor James Larmer. It was sold to the Grand United Order of Oddfellows for an Oddfellows Hall for £700 in 1870. The Oddfellows renovated the building and added a staircase and upper and lower halls. It was again sold to the Commercial Hotel (now the Braidwood Hotel) in 1937, and converted into basic flats during a housing shortage in World War II. It was subsequently vacant and increasingly derelict from the end of World War II until being bought by the Braidwood Historical Society in 1970. The historical society painstakingly renovated the building room by room with local fundraising over subsequent years until receiving a $30,000 bicentennial grant in the 1980s. It now operates as the Braidwood Museum.

== Description ==
The building is a two-storey masonry commercial building constructed in several phases over the latter nineteenth century. The street facade is constructed of coursed granite blocks with shaped flat arches over the openings. A stucco cornice and parapet demonstrates the part of the wall that was above the location and profile of the former two-storey veranda that had a bull nose roof. The windows are twelve-pane sliding sashes. There are doorways at both levels, including french doors from the first floor, indicating the original veranda. The side and rear walls are constructed of uncoursed rubble granite. The roofing is recent galvanised corrugated steel, with a box gutter behind the street parapet. The interior retains several fine timber Georgian mantelpieces, skirtings, shellac cedar architraves and deep window sills. The floor boards are comparatively wide and appear to be original. The original central staircase appears to be largely original with Georgian styling. This stair hall also has marbling on the wall plaster and early twentieth-century wall paper. The remnants of some original cornices remain, although the plaster quad cornices are recent.

The Oddfellows Society added a tower in Victorian Free Classical style, a stair hall to the south, and western wind containing large assembly rooms on each of two levels from the 1880s. The extensions were constructed of brick laid in English bond, and rendered on the front elevation. The southern timber stair added by the Odd Fellows in the late Victorian period. A skylight typical of 1890s windows is placed in the ceiling above. The assembly rooms retain their original butt jointed floor boards and Victorian joinery of twelve-paned sash windows and panel doors. The upper assembly room has a barrel-vaulted ceiling with original struck cornices and ceiling roses. The cantilevered beams supporting a former veranda on the north side of the upper assembly room remain, but the remaining fabric was removed for a timber-framed extension to the upper level only.

The original kitchen wing is constructed from rubble granite with sandstone sills and lintels, and a brick chimney. It was a separate building in the rear yard of one storey with a gable roof now clad with galvanised corrugated steel. The windows are twelve-pane sliding sashes.

A sandstock brick gable stable also lies in the rear yard. The brickwork is in Flemish bond; the roof is clad with timber shingles. A log building lock-up from the nineteenth century has been relocated to the rear yard.

=== Modifications and dates ===
- The front veranda has been removed, exposing the rendered line above the former bull nose veranda.
- The Odd Fellows Society built the stair tower and rear assembly halls c. 1880s.
- The upper assembly hall veranda was removed to allow for a first floor extension, possibly around the turn of the twentieth century.

== Heritage listing ==
Braidwood District Historical Society Museum was listed on the New South Wales State Heritage Register on 2 April 1999.
