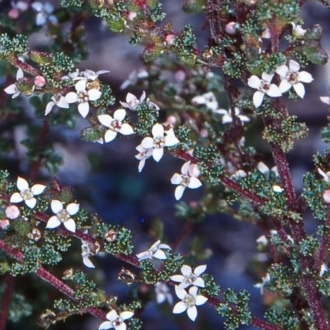
- In the ANBG

Conservation status
- Endangered (EPBC Act)

Scientific classification
- Kingdom: Plantae
- Clade: Tracheophytes
- Clade: Angiosperms
- Clade: Eudicots
- Clade: Rosids
- Order: Sapindales
- Family: Rutaceae
- Genus: Zieria
- Species: Z. adenophora

Binomial name
- Zieria adenophora Blakely

= Zieria adenophora =

Araluen zieria

Species of flowering plant

Zieria adenophora, commonly known as the Araluen Zieria, is a plant in the family Rutaceae and is only found near Araluen in the Southern Tablelands of New South Wales. It is a spreading shrub with small glossy, warty leaves and white or pink four-petalled flowers in spring. It is a rare plant with fewer than one hundred plants known from only one site.

== Description ==
Zieria adenophora is an openly branched shrub which grows to a height of 0.5–1 m (2–3 ft) and has its branches covered with many small warty tubercles. The leaves are strongly aromatic and are composed of three leaflets, each leaflet wedge-shaped to egg-shaped, about 2.5–4 mm (0.1–0.2 in) long and 2–3 mm (0.08–0.1 in) wide with a stalk about 2 mm (0.08 in) long. Both surfaces of the leaves are warty and mostly glabrous.

The flowers are white or very pale pink and are arranged in leaf axils in groups of one to three. The groups are shorter than the leaves, each flower about 5 mm (0.2 in) in diameter with small, triangular sepals. There are four lance-shaped petals 2–3 mm (0.08–0.1 in) long, with the narrower end towards the base. Flowering occurs in spring and is followed by fruit which are warty capsules about 5 mm (0.2 in) in diameter and divided into four chambers, each containing one or two seeds.

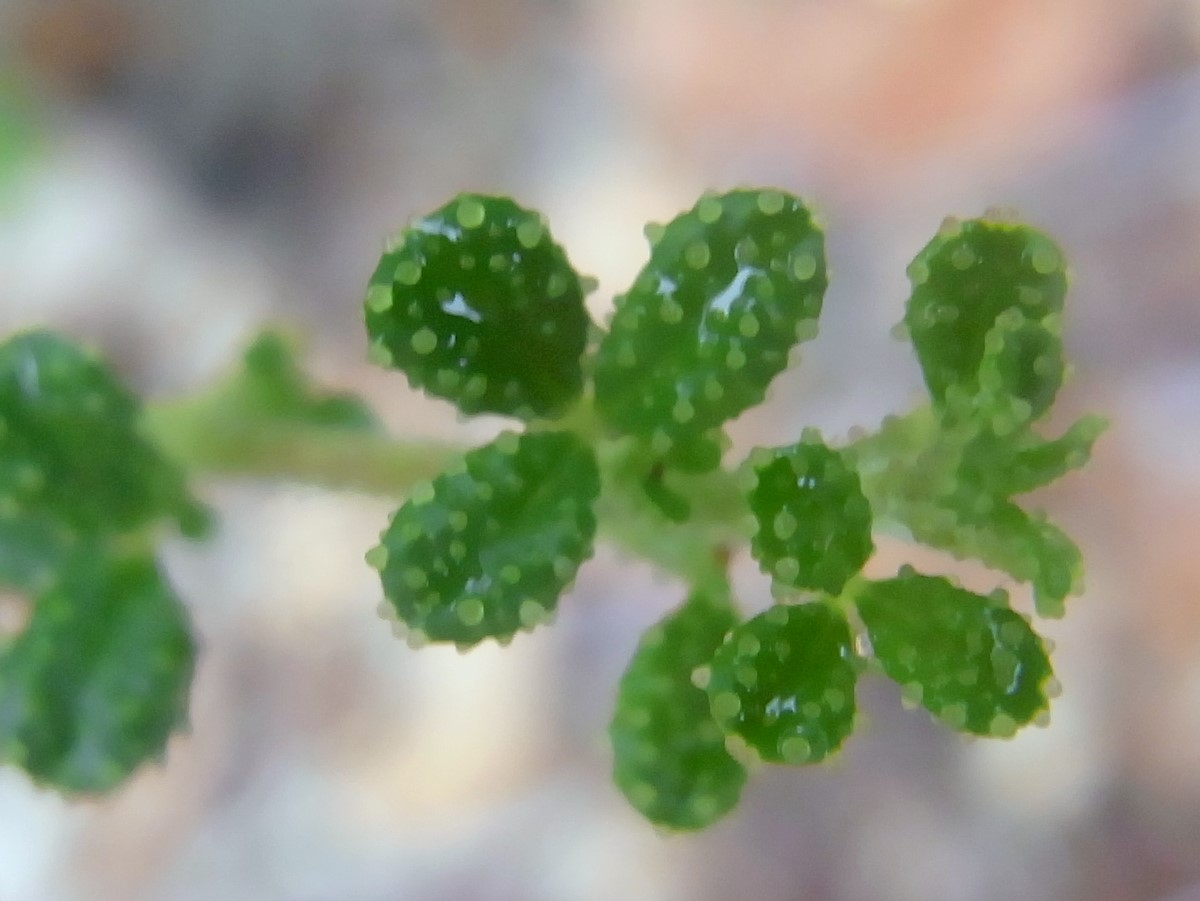
Close-up of leaves

== Taxonomy and naming ==
Zieria adenophora was first formally described in 1941 by William Blakely from a specimen collected near Bells Creek Falls, Araluen. The description was published in Contributions from the New South Wales National Herbarium. The specific epithet (adenophora) is derived from the Ancient Greek word aden meaning "gland" and the suffix -phor meaning "to bear", "to carry" or "to have".

== Distribution and habitat ==
Araluen Zieria grows on rocky hillsides near granite boulders in shrubland. It is only known from the Araluen district.

== Conservation ==
This zieria is listed as "endangered" under the New South Wales Threatened Species Conservation Act and under the Commonwealth Government Environment Protection and Biodiversity Conservation Act 1999 (EPBC) Act. In 2001, this zieria was only known from a population of 56 mature plants. Trampling by feral goats causes a serious threat to the survival of this plant but a fence has been constructed to deter grazing animals.
