= Ralph Hush =

Australian convict settler

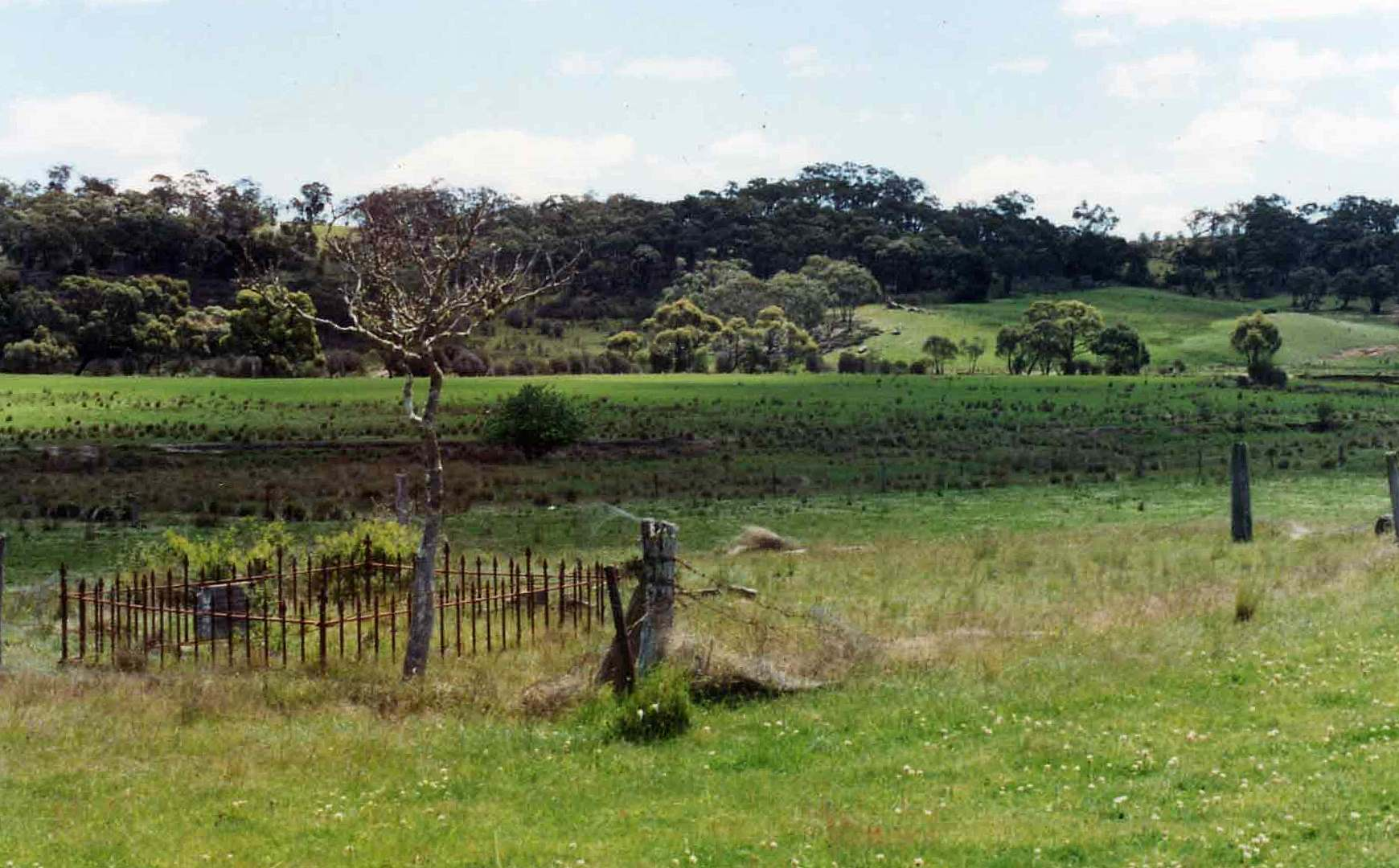
- The lonely Hush burial ground on Eastfield, Ralph Hush's farm in Braidwood
- Born: 1779; Spittal, Northumberland, England, UK
- Died: 2 June 1860 (age 81); Durran Durra, Braidwood, New South Wales, Australia
- Occupation(s): Convict and then farmer
- Spouse: Margaret Robinson
- Parents: Ralph Hush (father); Sarah Hush (mother)

Ralph Hush (1779 – 2 June 1860) was a convict sent from Northumberland to Australia in 1820. He was also one of the first convicts ever to receive a pardon from a life sentence after less than 5 years.

== Early life ==
Born on a Spittal farm in 1779, Ralph Hush was the youngest of five children. His family lived on a farm in Crookham, Northumberland to live where the family owned and worked on a farm about a mile from there called Crookham Eastfield. He eventually secured a job as a farmer.

== Transportation ==
Ralph was imprisoned for stealing 20 ewes and 20 lambs, tried and convicted on 14 August 1819 in Newcastle upon Tyne, where he was sentenced to life transportation to Australia. From the time of his trial until the sailing of his convict ship, Ralph Hush lived on a hulk of the ship, the Neptune I, which disembarked from The Downs, England on 23 March 1820. The ship's master was William McKissock and the surgeon was Jas Mitchell. The Neptune I arrived in Sydney Harbour on 17 July 1820 with 156 convicts on board after 114 days.

== Life in Australia ==
Ralph Hush was immediately taken to work at a farm and muster at Wingecarribee, New South Wales, now on the site of Bowral. The owner and founder of this area and all its property was John Oxley. Hush was taken under the wing of Oxley and worked for four (4) years on the muster.

== Family ==
On 25 April 1808 in Norham, Northumberland, Hush married 24-year-old Margaret Robinson; their union would last 52 years, until his death in 1860. They had four children:

- Ralph Hush (1808–1876)
- Phillis Hush (1809–1876), later Phyllis McCarthy.
- Joseph Hush (1811–1850)
- Sarah Hush (1818–1847), later Sarah Corbyn.

In 1823, Margaret wrote to the Governor of New South Wales asking to join her husband in Australia as a free settler. Below is a transcript of her letter sent in 1823:

To His Excellency General Darling Governor in Chief of the Colony of New South Wales and its Dependencies. The Humble Petition of Margaret Hush.

Respectfully herewith:

That your Excellency's Humble Petitioner arrived in the Colony in May 1824. Free with four children, to join her husband, Ralph Hush, a prisoner for life by the Neptune in 1820.

That your Excellency's Humble Petitioner's husband is now and has been since his arrival in July 1820, the assigned Government servant of John Oxley Esq., who has treated him and Petitioner exceedingly well.

That your Excellency's Humble Petitioner has lately perceived thro' the medium of the Public Prints that your Excellency is disposed to serve every deserving married man, is therefore emboldened to hope that your Excellency will be humanely pleased to allow of Petitioner's husband being transferred to her, with the view of his being the more enabled to render Petitioner and her four children that support which they ought to expect.

That Mr Oxley is desirous to serve your Petitioner and her husband in consequence of her husband's good conduct since his arrival now six years and is willing to transfer him to Petitioner as hereunder certified should it meet your Excellency's wishes.

Petitioner therefore most earnestly and most respectfully prays that your Excellency will be humanely pleased to acquiese to Petitioner's request for which mark of your Excellency benignity Petitioner and family will ever gratefully pray.

– Signed Margaret Hush

Margaret emigrated to Australia in 1823 on the ship Brothers, arriving on 7 May 1824 with her four children. While her husband was still under the control of the penal system, Margaret found a place to live and bring up the children. Ralph Hush was pardoned from his life sentence soon after his family joined him and became one of the first convicts to ever escape a life sentence after a term of only 4 years.

== Life in Braidwood ==
=== Farmer ===
In 1831, Ralph Hush purchased 640 acres (2.6 km^{2}) of land in Mongarlowe, Braidwood, and moved his family there by 1839. The property was called Eastfield. For the rest of his life, Ralph Hush was a farmer on various properties around the general Mongarlowe area, on farms such as Eastfield, Marlowe, Charleyong and St. Omer.

=== Licensee ===
In 1829 Margaret and Ralph Hush Jr. were the licensees of the inn The Traveller. It is now known as Tahmoor House and is an historic old inn built in 1824 and extended in 1835. It is the oldest building in the Shire of Wollondilly and one of the oldest coaching inns in Australia, at the gateway to the Southern Highlands.

His son, Ralph Hush eventually bought several of these farms and owned many inns, in and around the towns of Braidwood and Berrima. For a while in later life, Ralph Hush was a magistrate in Picton.

Ralph Hush died on the property of Durran Durra, Braidwood, aged 81. He was buried at Eastfield.
