= Carl Wilhelm Schmidt =

German missionary and minister

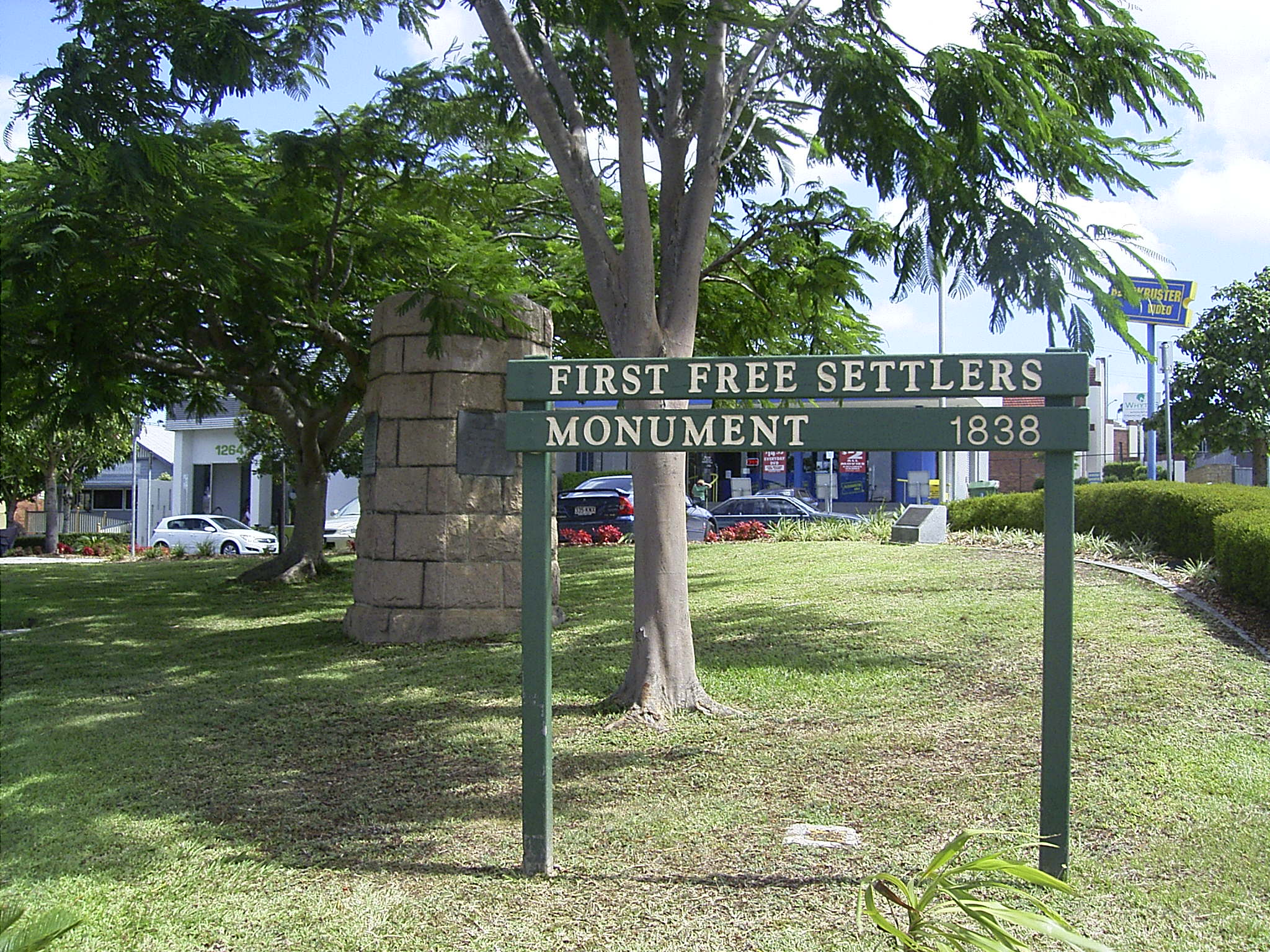
Schmidt and his fellow missionaries are memorialised at this monument in modern-day Nundah

Reverend Carl Wilhelm Schmidt (died 1864), also known as Karl Schmidt, was a German missionary, and an ordained minister of the Prussian United Church. Schmidt's missionary work took him to Queensland and Samoa, where he founded a number of Lutheran institutions and settlements.

== Early life ==
Schmidt was born in Stargard, Pomerania (now Poland). He studied at the Universities of Halle and Berlin, before becoming the first theological student of Johannes Gossner, a minister of the Bethlehem Bohemian Church in Berlin. Gossner was the founder of the Evangelical Union for the Spread of Christianity among the Heathen, and he recommended Schmidt to lead a party of nine missionaries trained for work with a British society.

In 1837, Schmidt came to the notice of Rev John Dunmore Lang in Australia, via Samuel Johnson, a friend of Gossner's in London. After being joined by fellow missionary Christopher Eipper in Greenock, Scotland, Schmidt and his party set sail for Australia on the Minerva. Conditions aboard the ship were harsh, with Moritz Schneider, a surgeon employed by Lang, dying of typhoid en route. Schmidt arrived in Sydney in January 1838.

== Missionary Work in Australia ==
=== Sydney ===
Upon arrival in Australia, Schmidt was admitted as a member of Lang's Presbyterian Synod of New South Wales on 15 March 1838. He founded the New South Wales Society in aid of the German Mission to the Aborigines, whose mission involved supporting a mission in connection with government funding. Schmidt ministered to a German congregation in Sydney for some months while a party scouted in the Moreton Bay area for a suitable site. Upon arrival in Brisbane in June 1838, Schmidt found that his scouting party had selected a location north of the settlement that they called Zion's Hill.

=== Zion's Hill Mission ===
He was the leader of the first European settlement in what is now the area of Nundah, Queensland, when he helped found the "Zion Hill" mission, located near to the modern-day "Walkers Way". Although joined by fellow German missionary Reverend Christopher Eipper, Schmidt did not have much success in bringing Christianity to the Aboriginal people in the area, and his mission was dismantled at the behest of the colonial government in 1846.

=== Kilcoy Poisoning ===
Schmidt was also notable for being involved in leaking the details of a deliberate mass poisoning of Aboriginal people at Kilcoy in Queensland to the Sydney press. Schmidt had recorded in his travel diary the details of the incident, in which as many as sixty Aboriginal people were given flour and other rations laced with strychnine by white settlers. Not wanting to upset the delicate situation and cause any reprisal attacks, the authorities attempted to hush up the affair. Fellow minister and evangelical reformer John Dunmore Lang published the details from Schmidt's travel diary in the Colonial Observer, causing a major scandal in Sydney, the colonial capital.

== Return to Europe, and Samoa ==
Following the failure of the Zion's Hill mission, Schmidt returned to England in 1846. He briefly ministered to a Lutheran congregation in London before being accepted by the London Missionary Society. From 1848 to 1857, he served as a missionary in Samoa. On May 25, 1855, his wife died, and in 1857 he resigned from the society and started a free school for the children of foreign residents of the city of Apia in Samoa. Around this time he also married Salaneta, a Samoan woman, with whom he had one son. He died in Apia in early 1864.
