= Braidwood, New South Wales =

Braidwood
- Town
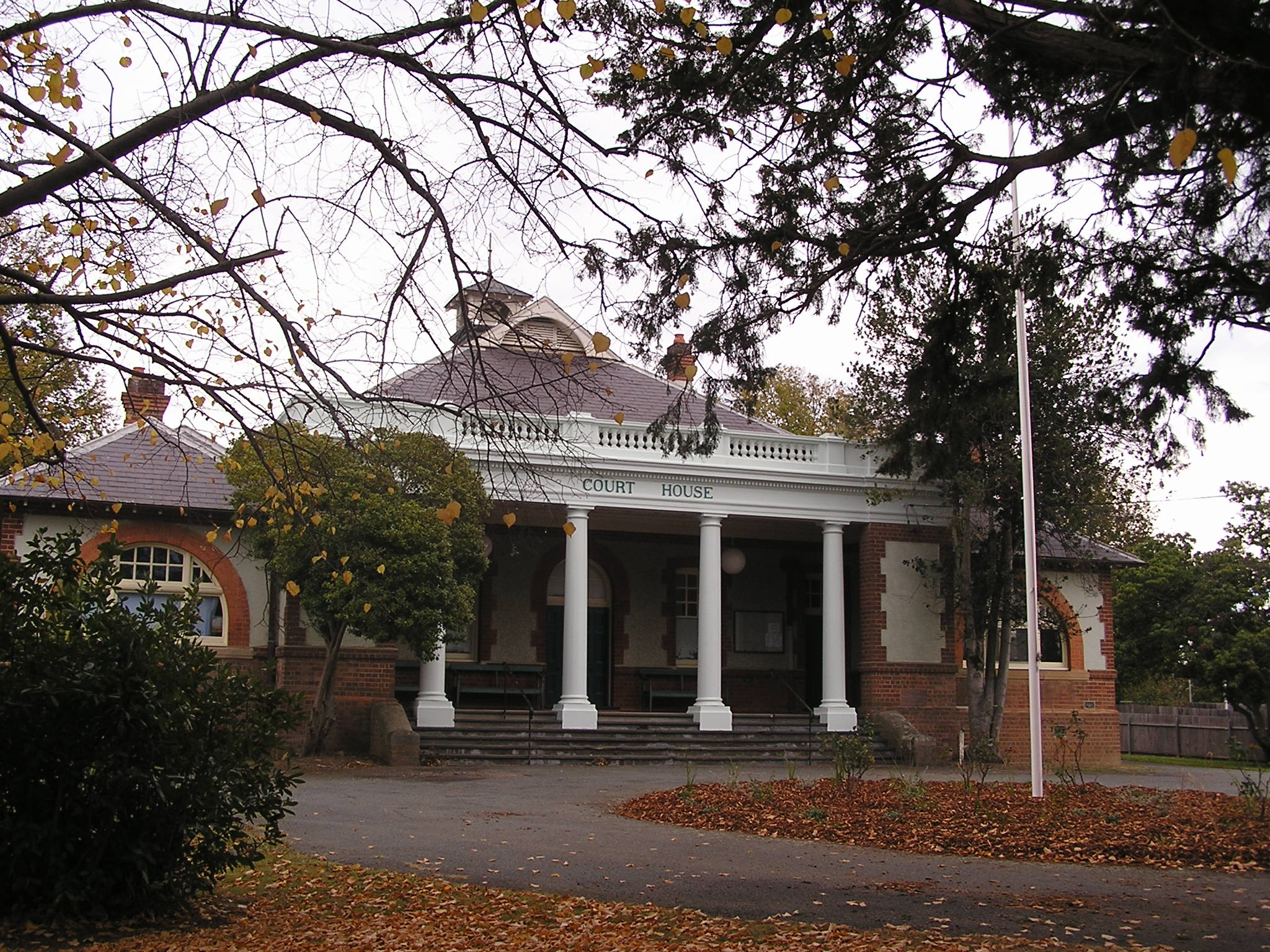
- The Braidwood Courthouse, built in 1901

- Coordinates: 35°26′0″S 149°48′0″E
- Country: Australia
- State: New South Wales
- Region: Southern Tablelands
- LGA: Queanbeyan–Palerang Regional Council
- Location: 325 km (202 mi) S of Sydney; 91 km (57 mi) E of Canberra; 74 km (46 mi) E of Queanbeyan; 62 km (39 mi) NW of Batemans Bay

Government
  - State electorate: Monaro
  - Federal division: Eden-Monaro
- Elevation: 643 m (2,110 ft)

Population
  - Total: 1,720 (2021 census)
- Postcode: 2622
- County: St Vincent
- Parish: Braidwood
- Mean max temp: 19.0 °C (66.2 °F)
- Mean min temp: 5.5 °C (41.9 °F)
- Annual rainfall: 718.2 mm (28.28 in)
Localities around Braidwood
Warri	Warri	Durran Durra
Bombay	Braidwood	Mongarlowe
Bendoura	Jembaicumbene	Northangera

Braidwood is a town in the Southern Tablelands of New South Wales, Australia, in Queanbeyan–Palerang Regional Council. It is located on the Kings Highway linking Canberra with Batemans Bay. It is approximately 200 kilometres south west of Sydney, 60 kilometres inland from the coast, and 55 kilometres east of Canberra. Braidwood is a service town for the surrounding district which is based on sheep and cattle grazing, and forestry operations.

== Indigenous history ==
Braidwood is located within the Yuin Nation, on Walbanga Country. The Walbanga People speak dialects of the Thurga (Durga/Dhurga) language.

The Walbanga Peoples relied on the plentiful supply of vegetables available in the tablelands, such as the tubers of the yam daisy, wattle-seeds, and orchid tubers. In September to May, fish and crayfish were eaten, while possums and larger grazing animals were hunted year round. The Walbanga People and neighbouring groups made annual trips in December and January from to the Bogong Mountains and Snowy Mountains to roast and eat bogong moths (Agrotis infusa).

The lives of the Walbanga People were forever changed by the arrival and early colonisation of Europeans in the 1820s. There were reports of the loss of water, fish and native animals essential to the First Nations's diet after the arrival of the settlers. The settlers also brought exotic diseases, particularly smallpox, the influenza epidemic in 1846-7 and syphilis, which devastated the First Nation's people in the region, likely including the Walbanga People. The Walbanga and surrounding populations culture and traditional life was considered to have been destroyed by 1850. Bogong moth ceremonies, intertribal meetings and corroborees also ceased in the region.

In 1872, First Nation's Peoples from the south coast and the highlands areas met in a large ceremonial gathering on the Braidwood goldfields, where they also held discussions about strategies to gain back access to their land. After the gathering, the local police officer, Martin Brennan, was approached by 62 members of the gathering, led by 'Jack Bawn and Alick' who asked for his assistance, and Brennan recorded the following: "I asked Jack what they wanted. He replied, 'We have come to you to intercede for us in getting the Government to do something for us... I have assisted the police for many years, and we want to get some land which we can call our own in reality, where we can settle down, and which the old people can call their home.'..."

On 29 March 1873, Brennan sent the government a comprehensive report detailing the experiences, circumstances and the aspirations of the group. Shortly afterwards he received instructions to name forty acres of Crown Lands in whatever location Jack Bawn desired as an Aboriginal Reserve. However, Jack Bawn and his people were blocked from occupying the surveyed land due to the hostility from surrounding white farmers, but they continued to urge Brennan to press Authorities for the land. Brennan also recorded the following statement in regards to the First Nation's Peoples of the Braidwood and Coast Districts "...whose aspirations at all times were to be allowed some land which they might call their own...; which they might cultivate unmolested for the use of themselves and their families; and where the aborigines of the surrounding districts might meet periodically for the purpose of holding coroborees and other exhilarating games."

As of the 2016 Census, there were less than 100 First Nations' Australians living in the Braidwood Region.

Historical population
Year	Pop.	±%
1921	1,042	—
1933	1,073	+3.0%
1947		—
1954	1,088	—
1961	1,052	−3.3%
1966	929	−11.7%
1971	959	+3.2%
1976	989	+3.1%
1981	944	−4.6%
1986	958	+1.5%
1991	976	+1.9%
1996	940	−3.7%
2001	996	+6.0%
2006	1,108	+11.2%
2011	1,158	+4.5%
2016	1,273	+9.9%
2021	1,414	+11.1%
Source: Australian Bureau of Statistics data.

== Settler history ==
European explorers reached the district in 1822 (Kearns, Marsh and Packer). The area was first settled by Europeans in the 1820s, and the town was surveyed in 1839. The village was located near the headwaters of the Shoalhaven River. The settlement was built with the labour of convicts, and many of the buildings they built around the region are still standing.

Most streets in the town are named after early settlers of the surrounding district; Elrington, Coghill, Duncan, Mackellar, Ryrie, Wallace, and Wilson. Ryrie Park is named after Alexander Ryrie.

=== Dr Wilson ===
The town was named after Dr Thomas Braidwood Wilson. He had been a surgeon-superintendent of ships taking convicts to New South Wales and Van Diemen's Land (now known as Tasmania). He was first granted land in Van Diemen's Land in 1824, which he exchanged for land near Lake George in 1825. In addition he was given 2560 acres (10 km^{2}) which he selected in the 'new country' on two tributaries of the Shoalhaven, Monkittee and Flood creeks. In 1833, the western end of Wilson's grant was resumed and reserved for a future village and a similar area added to the eastern end in compensation. He eventually controlled a total of 12,305 acres in the area. He and his wife and children settled in the district in late 1836. He became a community leader and amongst other things contracted to build the first courthouse in 1837–38. In 1840 Wilson petitioned the government to build a road from Braidwood to Jervis Bay to enable faster and cheaper shipping of the wool clip to Sydney and, with Col. John Mackenzie, supplied the materials and labour for the Braidwood to Nerriga section.

In 1841 Braidwood Farm had 141 residents. Wilson was sent bankrupt due to a drought in the late 1830s and the subsequent depression. He died in November 1843. His land was sold for £2,000 to John Coghill, who now owned all the land on the south, east and north of the town. Coghill built the historic house Bedervale. However, before his death, Wilson had purchased the block immediately to the north of Braidwood. He was buried on this block, high on the hill overlooking the town.

A memorial and large pine tree mark the site of Wilson's grave, from which there are views of the town. The path to the grave is no longer open to the public.

=== First Royal Commission ===
Braidwood was the subject of Australia's first royal commission in 1867, inquiring into the activities of police officers and managers in the district, concerning the extent to which bushrangers had been shielded and assisted by police connivance and inactivity. The Commission identified several instances of misconduct and found the superintendent of police had failed to exercise 'strict and proper control over his men.'

=== Gold discovered ===
Gold was discovered in 1851, and for the next two decades the district's population swelled to about 10,000. Supplies and produce to support the workforce on the gold fields came from as far afield as the Canberra region, (though Canberra itself would not be founded until 1913). This prosperity lasted for several years, during which some substantial commercial buildings including banks and hotels were constructed.

=== Twentieth century ===
Braidwood was formerly the seat of the Tallaganda local government area. However, following restructuring of local government areas by the New South Wales Government, it is now part of Queanbeyan-Palerang Regional Council. The local paper is now called the Braidwood Times.

Through much of the 20th century, Braidwood was essentially in rural recession. Amongst other consequences, very little building work was carried out, and as a result the town entered the 21st century with much of its original streetscape and architecture intact. On 30 March 2006 the town and its setting were listed on the NSW State Heritage Register, following a period of unpleasant dispute between those wishing to preserve the town's charm and those wishing to develop it.

Braidwood is located equidistant from Bungendore and Tarago railway stations, a distance of approximately 40 kilometres. NSW TrainLink operate multiple direct services from both railways stations to Canberra, Sydney, and provides connections across the state. Murray's coach services operate daily between Bateman's Bay and Canberra including picking up and setting down passengers in Braidwood.

== Heritage listings ==
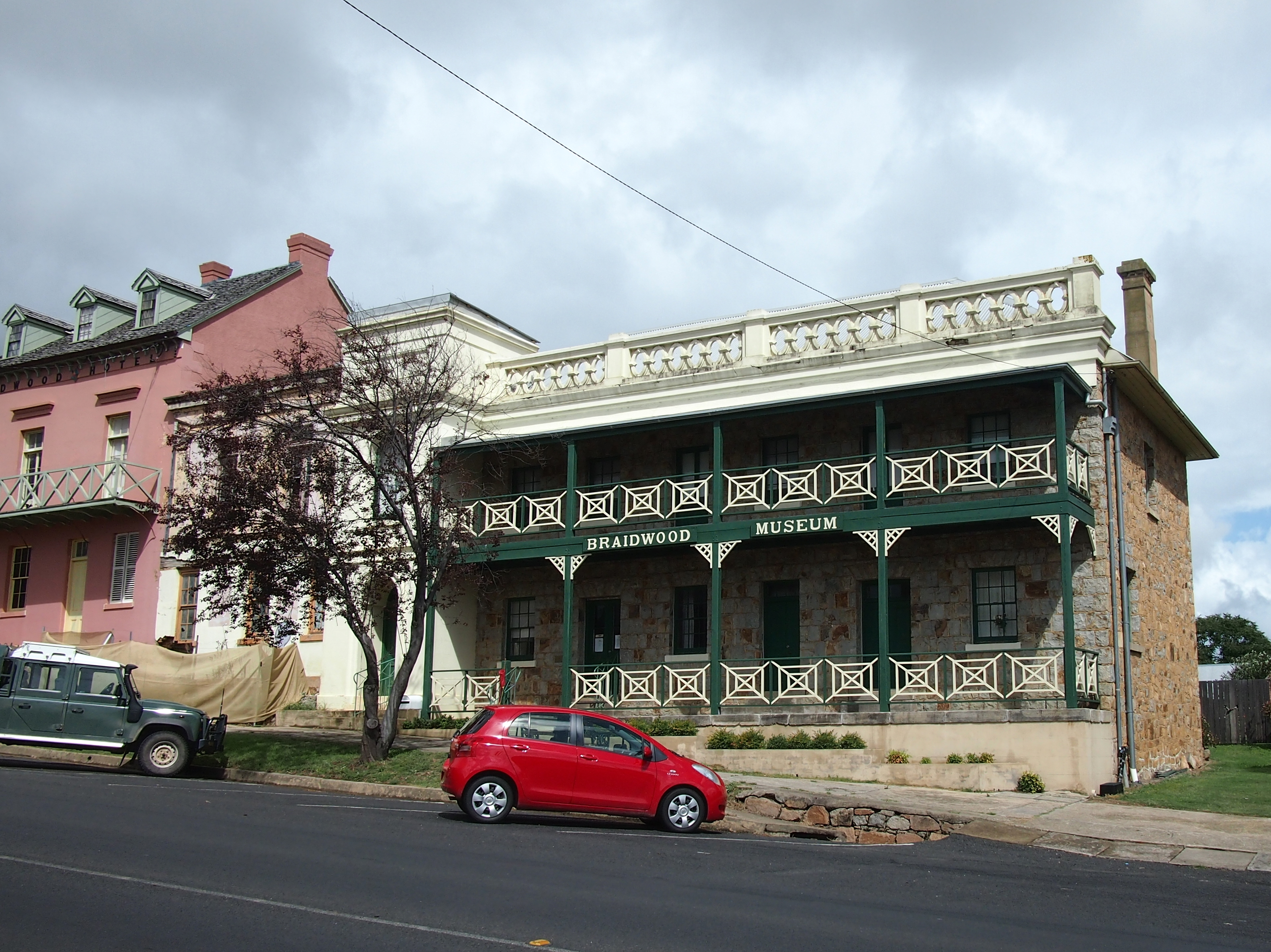
The Braidwood District Historical Society Museum

Braidwood has a number of heritage-listed sites, including:

- Braidwood and Its Setting
- Monkitee Street: Bedervale
- Wallace Street: Braidwood District Historical Society Museum
- Wallace Street: Mill Complex
- 119 Wallace Street: Albion Hotel

== Climate ==
Braidwood has an oceanic climate (Cfb) with mild to warm summers and cold winters with frequent morning frost. Due to its position on the eastern slopes of the Great Dividing Range and its proximity to the Tasman Sea, summer temperatures are generally cooler than in nearby Bungendore and Goulburn which lie further inland at a similar altitude. Braidwood's greater exposure to moist easterly winds also yields a wetter climate relative to Bungendore and Goulburn. Warm to hot summer days are usually tempered by afternoon and evening easterly breezes.

Climate data for Braidwood (1991–2020, extremes 1965–2025); 665 m AMSL; 35.43° S, 149.78° E
Month	Jan	Feb	Mar	Apr	May	Jun	Jul	Aug	Sep	Oct	Nov	Dec	Year
Record high °C (°F)	42.6 (108.7)	42.0 (107.6)	36.6 (97.9)	31.4 (88.5)	26.2 (79.2)	20.3 (68.5)	18.5 (65.3)	22.3 (72.1)	28.9 (84.0)	31.4 (88.5)	39.2 (102.6)	40.4 (104.7)	42.6 (108.7)
Mean daily maximum °C (°F)	27.1 (80.8)	25.4 (77.7)	22.9 (73.2)	19.5 (67.1)	16.0 (60.8)	12.6 (54.7)	12.1 (53.8)	13.6 (56.5)	16.7 (62.1)	19.4 (66.9)	22.2 (72.0)	24.8 (76.6)	19.4 (66.9)
Mean daily minimum °C (°F)	12.4 (54.3)	12.3 (54.1)	10.1 (50.2)	6.1 (43.0)	2.7 (36.9)	1.0 (33.8)	0.1 (32.2)	0.6 (33.1)	3.3 (37.9)	5.8 (42.4)	8.5 (47.3)	10.7 (51.3)	6.1 (43.0)
Record low °C (°F)	1.2 (34.2)	1.7 (35.1)	−1.4 (29.5)	−5.6 (21.9)	−7.6 (18.3)	−9.3 (15.3)	−9.2 (15.4)	−9.8 (14.4)	−6.7 (19.9)	−6.0 (21.2)	−2.1 (28.2)	−0.4 (31.3)	−9.8 (14.4)
Average precipitation mm (inches)	61.6 (2.43)	70.8 (2.79)	61.7 (2.43)	31.5 (1.24)	37.5 (1.48)	58.9 (2.32)	33.2 (1.31)	50.7 (2.00)	45.9 (1.81)	52.5 (2.07)	65.3 (2.57)	63.2 (2.49)	633.0 (24.92)
Average precipitation days	12.3	11.2	12.8	10.9	11.7	13.7	12.7	10.6	10.7	11.2	12.3	11.0	141.1
Average afternoon relative humidity (%)	49	54	52	51	55	61	57	50	50	52	53	49	53
Source 1: Braidwood (Monkittee Street, 1907–1975)
Source 2: Braidwood Racecourse AWS (1985–present)

== Population ==
At the 2021 census, Braidwood had a population of 1,720. 78.0% of people were born in Australia and 85.9% of people only spoke English at home. The most common responses for religion were No Religion 40.5%, Catholic 21.0% and Anglican 16.6%.

== Media ==
Braidwood is served by local newspaper, the Braidwood Times, which is owned by Australian Community Media.

Braidwood is home to community radio station 2BRW. Operating under the name 'Braidwood Community Radio', the station can be heard on 88.9 FM. For commercial radio, Braidwood is in the Goulburn broadcast licence area with GNFM and Eagle FM These stations have studios in Goulburn. In terms of ABC Local Radio, the town is served by both ABC Radio Canberra on 666 AM and ABC South East NSW on 103.5 FM.

The town falls under the Southern NSW television licence area with stations transmitting from a tower on Mount Gillamatong, adjacent to the township.

== In popular culture ==
=== Film and television ===
The town has several times been used for film locations, including Robbery Under Arms (1920), Ned Kelly (1970), The Year My Voice Broke (1987), On our Selection (1995), Finding Joy (2003), The Discontinuity (2009) and Australia's Most Haunted (2013).

== Education ==
There are two schools in Braidwood:

- Braidwood Central School - a government-funded co-educational primary and secondary school
- St Bede's Primary School - a Catholic primary school

== Notable residents ==
- Deuchar Gordon, Australian pastoralist and president of the Australian Club
- Judith Wright, Australian poet and conservationist and Aboriginal rights campaigner
- John Chapman, Army Officer
- James Fraser, first native-born Commissioner of Railways

== See also ==
- Ralph Hush
- Christopher Eipper
- Quong Tart
