= List of people legally executed in New South Wales =

This is a list of people executed in New South Wales. It lists people who were executed by British (and from 1901, Australian) authorities within the modern-day boundaries of New South Wales. For people executed in other parts of Australia, see the sidebar.

Within weeks of the arrival of the First Fleet in 1788 and the establishment of Sydney, New South Wales as the first permanent European settlement, Thomas Barrett became the first person to be executed in Australia under British law.

== From 1788 to 1830 ==
=== Location of execution not indicated ===
- James Reece – 8 February 1799 – Hanged for bestiality with a sow. Reece tried to cut his own throat on the morning of his execution.
- John Hardy – 2 June 1800 – Hanged for vagrancy and theft.
- William Jones – March 1803 – Hanged for robbing Thomas Harley, a settler from Prospect.
- James Lovell – 22 February 1805 – Hanged for forging and uttering.
- George Holland – 11 October 1806 – Hanged for breaking into the house of Laughlane Gallighcoghan at Parramatta and stealing 10 shillings. Holland had assaulted the occupant of the home, described as a "feeble old man".
- Dennis Kaneen – 27 November 1806 – Hanged for breaking into the house of James Hogsen and stealing six bushels of maize, some meat, sugar and a copper coin amounting to nine shillings and three pence.
- William Page – 15 December 1806 – Hanged for burglary from the house of William Tracey at Fennel Farm.
- Abraham Smith – 15 December 1806 – Hanged for burglary from the house of William Tracey at Fennel Farm.
- William Poxam – 4 April 1807 – Hanged for sheep stealing.
- John Hughes – 4 April 1807 – Hanged for entering the house of Edward Redmond and stealing a chest containing cash, bills and other property.
- Hugh Dowling – 28 September 1808 – Hanged for armed burglary of the house of William Styles at Nepean and stealing cash and clothing.
- John McCabe - 21 January 1813 – Hanged for robbery of William Parish in Hobart
- John Townshend – 21 January 1813 – Hanged for robbery of William Parish in Hobart
- Peter Gory – 21 January 1813 – Hanged for robbery of William Parish in Hobart
- William Davis – 11 June 1813 – Hanged for cutting and maiming William Mason with a knife during a drunken brawl at Ultimo.
- Thomas Thorpe – September 1813 – Hanged for assaulting and robbing John Galligan of a silver watch on the King's Highway.
- William Gray – March or April 1814 – Hanged for highway robbery. Stopped the cart of Edward Powell Jr and John Beckwith on the King's Highway and robbed them of ten gallons of spirits and other items.
- Dennis Donovan – 12 July 1814 – Hanged for burglary of the house of John Cowley at Surry Hills, the murders of William Alder, Thomas White and Hannah Sculler on the Hawkesbury, and for rape. His body was handed over for anatomisation and dissection.
- Patrick Dawson – 9 February 1816 – Hanged for the robbery and murder of Edward Pugh at his home in Richmond. His body was dissected and anatomised.
- Philip McGee – 9 February 1816 – Hanged for the robbery and murder of Edward Pugh at his home in Richmond. His body was dissected and anatomised.
- Henry Laycock – 9 February 1816 – Hanged for the robbery and murder of Edward Pugh at his home in Richmond. His body was dissected and anatomised.
- Thomas Hill – 1 March 1816 – Hanged for cutting and maiming police constable Thomas Smith near Parramatta.
- William Langford – 1 March 1816 – Hanged for highway robbery on the Parramatta Road, robbing William Wright of a silver watch.
- Elizabeth Anderson – 19 July 1816 – Hanged for the murder of her husband, John Anderson, at Pitt Town. Her body was handed over to surgeons to be dissected and anatomised.
- James Stock – 19 July 1816 – Hanged for the murder of John Anderson at Pitt Town. His body was handed over for dissection and anatomisation.
- Nicholas Knight – 19 July 1816 – Hanged for highway robbery of Mrs Pearce on the Liverpool Rd, of two gallons of rum and a quantity of barley.
- Thomas Collins – 1 November 1816 – Hanged for highway robbery having violently assaulted and robbed the cart of John Andrews on the Parramatta Road.
- Hugh MacAlaire – 1 November 1816 – Hanged for highway robbery having violently assaulted and robbed the cart of John Andrews on the Parramatta Road.
- Daniel Moowattin (also called Daniel Mowatty) – 1 November 1816 – Hanged for the rape of a fifteen-year-old girl at Parramatta. The first Indigenous person legally hanged in Australia.
- Patrick Ryan – 19 December 1825 – Hanged for arson in setting fire to the house of Richard Thompson at Bathurst.
- John Judd – 30 April 1830 – Hanged for robbery and putting in fear of John Smith in the Singleton area. After receiving sentence of death from Judge Dowling, Judd remarked to the court "My Lord and Gentlemen of the Jury, it is only five minutes choking."
- John Roach – 30 April 1830 – Hanged for burglary and putting in fear in the Singleton area.

=== Sydney Cove (1788-9) ===
- Thomas Barrett – 27 February 1788 – Barrett was publicly hanged at Sydney Cove for stealing or conspiring to steal from government stores. He was the first person hanged in the colony of New South Wales.
- John Bennett – 2 May 1788 – A 19-year-old convict who was publicly hanged at Sydney Cove for theft.
- Samuel Payton – 28 June 1788 – Hanged at Sydney Cove for stealing shirts, stockings and combs. He was a 20-year-old convict and stonemason.
- Edward Corbett – 28 June 1788 – Hanged at Sydney Cove for the theft of four cows.
- James Daly – December 1788 – Hanged at Sydney Cove for theft of a handkerchief from a fellow convict using force and arms.
- James Baker – 27 March 1789 – One of six Marines hanged at Sydney Cove for theft of government stores.
- James Brown – 27 March 1789 – One of six Marines hanged at Sydney Cove for theft of government stores.
- Richard Lukes – 27 March 1789 – One of six Marines hanged at Sydney Cove for theft of government stores.
- Thomas Jones – 27 March 1789 – One of six Marines hanged at Sydney Cove for theft of government stores.
- Luke Haines/Haynes – 27 March 1789 – One of six Marines hanged at Sydney Cove for theft of government stores.
- Richard Askew/Asky – 27 March 1789 – One of six Marines hanged at Sydney Cove for theft of government stores.
- Ann Davis (alias Judith Jones) – 23 November 1789 – The first woman hanged in Australia. A First Fleet convict, she was found guilty of theft from a fellow convict at Sydney Cove. She claimed to be pregnant to avoid the noose and some old women were instructed to inspect her. One of the women told the court, "Gentlemen, she is as much with child as I am."

=== Sydney ===
==== Sydney 1790s ====
- Thomas Sanderson – 10 January 1790 – Hanged at Sydney for stealing with force of arms flour, beef, pork, associated chattels and goods from Thomas Steel and Joseph Bishop.
- William Chafe – 20 April 1790 – Hanged at Sydney for burglary from the house of James Sunnyhill in Sydney Cove.
- Hugh Low – 24 August 1790 – Hanged at Sydney for sheep stealing. He had behaved with merit during the shipwreck of the Guardian; a letter of pardon arrived from His Majesty 12 months after his execution.
- James Chapman – 28 July 1791 – Hanged at Sydney for breaking into the house of John Patree and stealing a shirt.
- James Collington – 8 February 1792 – Hanged at Sydney for breaking into the hut of the baker John Campbell and stealing bread, flour and a check apron. At the hanging tree he addressed the assembled convicts before his execution, warning them to avoid the path he had pursued; but said that he was induced by hunger to commit the crime for which he suffered.
- John Crowe/Crow – 10 December 1793 – Hanged at Sydney for burglary.
- Archibald Macdonald – 14 July 1794 – Hanged at Sydney for burglary.
- John Hemming – 17 July 1794 – Hanged at Sydney for burglary from the house of Robert Spriggs.
- John Bevan – 6 October 1794 – Hanged at Sydney for burglary from the house of William Fielder.
- John Hill – 16 October 1794 – Hanged at Sydney for murder in the course of robbery. He had fatally stabbed Simon Burn in the left side of the chest at Parramatta.
- William Smith – 16 November 1795 – Hanged at Sydney for burglary from the house of William Parrish at Prospect Hill.
- John Fenlow – 8 August 1796 – Hanged at Sydney for the murder of his servant David Lane at Mulgrave, on the Hawkesbury.
- Francis Morgan – 30 November 1796 – Hanged at Sydney for the murder of Simon Raven. Following his execution his body was gibbeted on Pinchgut Island in Sydney Harbour. His skeleton was still hanging there four years after his execution.
- John Lawler/Lawor – 30 November 1796 – Hanged at Sydney for robbing the public stores.
- Martin McEwan – 30 November 1796 – Soldier, hanged at Sydney for robbing the public stores.
- Samuel Mobbs – 16 March 1797 – Hanged at Sydney for "robbing the public stores".
- John Rayner – 31 July 1797 – Hanged at Sydney for burglary.
- Johnathan Boroughbridge – April 1798 – Hanged at Sydney for piracy after he and accomplices stole two boats with the intent of escaping the colony.
- Michael Gibson – April 1798 – Hanged at Sydney for piracy after he and accomplices stole two boats with the intent of escaping the colony.
- Samuel Wright – February 1799 – Hanged at Sydney for burglary from the house of Simeon Lord in High St (Lower George St). Wright had been reprieved at the gallows in 1793, when previously sentenced to hang for burglary.
- Thomas Jones – 6 July 1799 – Publicly hanged in Sydney on the site of the crime for the murder of missionary Samuel Clode in the brickfields. A soldier in the NSW Corps, he had owed the missionary money but when the man came to collect he was murdered by Jones with his wife and two neighbours as accomplices. Clode was stabbed, his throat cut and his skull fractured with an axe. The Jones house was pulled down and burned on orders of the governor, the gallows were erected on its spot and he and two of his accomplices were hanged. Jones' corpse was later gibbeted.
- Elizabeth Jones – 6 July 1799 – Wife of Thomas Jones. Hanged at Sydney for her part in the murder of missionary Samuel Clode at the brickfields in Sydney. After being hanged her body was handed over for surgical dissection.
- William Elberry – 6 July 1799 – Hanged at Sydney for his part in the murder of Samuel Clode, executed where the murder took place then gibbeted.

==== Sydney 1800-09 ====
- William Meredeth – 4 July 1800 – Hanged at Sydney for escaping from custody.
- Thomas Thompson – 4 July 1800 – A corporal in the New South Wales Corps. Hanged at Sydney for forgery.
- James Riley - December 1800 - Hanged at Sydney for burglary. However another source indicates that he may not in fact have been executed.
- Charles Davis - February 1801 - Hanged at Sydney
- David Burton - 5 December 1801 - Hanged at Sydney for the murder of Mary Hailey
- Laughlan Doyle – 14 March 1803 – Hanged at Sydney for robbery of Thomas Neal of Richmond Hill.
- John Lynch – March 1803 – Hanged at Sydney for feloniously entering the house of Thomas Neal of Richmond Hill.
- John Francis Morgan – March 1803 – Hanged at Sydney for feloniously entering the house of Thomas Neal of Richmond Hill.
- Patrick Ross – March 1803 – Hanged at Sydney for feloniously entering the house of Thomas Neal of Richmond Hill.
- Thomas Shanks – March 1803 – Hanged at Sydney for feloniously entering the house of Thomas Neal of Richmond Hill.
- Michael Wollaghan – March 1803 – Hanged at Sydney for feloniously entering the house of Thomas Neal of Richmond Hill.
- Laurence Dempsey – 19 March 1803 – Hanged at Sydney for feloniously entering the house of Thomas Neal of Richmond Hill.
- Timothy Mulch/Mulcahy/Malahoy – 25 March 1803 – Hanged at Sydney for feloniously entering the house of Thomas Neal of Richmond Hill.
- John Brown – 26 March 1803 – Hanged at Sydney for feloniously entering the house of Thomas Neal of Richmond Hill.
- James Connors – 26 March 1803 – Hanged at Sydney for feloniously entering the house of Thomas Neal of Richmond Hill.
- Charles Crump – 20 February 1804 – Hanged in Sydney for the theft of nine pieces of chintzes and printed calicoes from William Tough in Sydney Cove.
- John Brannan – 10 March 1804 – Convict who participated in the Castle Hill Rebellion. Hanged at Sydney.
- Timothy Hogan – 10 March 1804 – Convict who participated in the Castle Hill Rebellion. Hanged at Sydney.
- James Bevan (known as 'Warminster') – 21 May 1804 – Hanged at Sydney for the rape of eight-year-old Elizabeth Douglas.
- John Green – 21 November 1804 – Hanged at Sydney for rape near Parramatta on 11 November 1804. Green was African-American, born in Pennsylvania.
- William Miller – 30 September 1805 – Hanged at Sydney for the murder of Bridget Kean at Hawkesbury.
- Herbert Keeling – 28 April 1806 – Hanged at Sydney for forging and uttering two promissory notes purporting to be drawn by Henry Kable.
- James Dabbs – 16 May 1806 – Hanged at Sydney for burglary from the home of Rowland Hassall at Parramatta.
- Elias Davis - 4 September 1806 - Hanged at Sydney for breaking and entering the dwelling house of Robert Broughton, Parramatta.
- William Organ – 11 October 1806 – Hanged at Sydney for stealing nine sheep from his employer John Palmer between the Hawkesbury and Sydney.
- Joseph Moreton – 27 November 1806 – Hanged at Sydney for burglary of Henry Williams near Castle Hill.
- William Mason – 27 November 1806 – Hanged at Sydney for breaking and entering the house of John Prosser and stealing a cart and an article of clothing.
- John Murphey – 27 November 1806 – Hanged at Sydney for breaking and entering the house of Michael Connor at North Boundary.
- James Halfpenny – 17 December 1806 – Hanged at Sydney for bushranging and theft of livestock, four muskets and a chest.
- Stephen Halfpenny – 17 December 1806 – Hanged at Sydney for bushranging and theft of livestock, four muskets and a chest.
- Joseph Eades – 3 July 1807 – Hanged at Sydney for robbing a cart of alcohol and clothing items.
- John Higgins – 3 July 1807 – Hanged at Sydney for robbing a cart of alcohol and clothing items.
- William Morgan – 3 July 1807 – Hanged at Sydney for robbing a cart of alcohol and clothing items.
- Robert Murray – 3 July 1807 – Hanged at Sydney for sheep stealing from the property of James Larratts.
- Benjamin Yeates – 3 July 1807 – Hanged at Sydney for sheep stealing from the property of James Larratts.
- John Brown – 30 May 1808 – Hanged at Sydney. A convict who escaped from custody and remained at large in the Van Diemen's Land wilderness for some 20 months. During this time, with John Lemon (Lemon was shot dead while resisting capture) he was involved in the murder of three soldiers, Corporal John Curry, Private Robert Grindstone and Private James Daniels. For his involvement in the crimes Brown was transported from Van Diemen's Land to Sydney to stand trial. His body was dissected and gibbeted.
- Alexander Wilson (alias Charles Boyle) – 18 June 1808 – Hanged at Sydney for burglary from the house of William Moad.
- John MacNeal – 18 June 1808 – Hanged at Sydney for burglary and robbery upon his master, having stolen two half casks and two quarter casks of gunpowder from the house of Robert Campbell.
- Mary Grady – 18 June 1808 – Hanged at Sydney for burglary from the house of Charles Stuart at Parramatta.
- Richard Broughton – 29 August 1808 – Hanged in Sydney for stealing two head of horned cattle from John Palmer at Hawkesbury.
- John Cheeseman – 29 August 1808 – Hanged in Sydney for stealing two head of horned cattle from John Palmer at Hawkesbury.
- Charles Flynn – 29 August 1808 – Hanged in Sydney for stealing from on board the ship Hero, lying in Sydney Cove, two spy glasses valued at 40 shillings and a table cloth valued at 10 shillings.
- Joseph Moreton – 29 August 1808 – Hanged in Sydney for forging and uttering a promissory note thereby defrauding Benjamin South of Richmond Hill the sum of £21.
- Thomas Doolan (Dowlan) – 26 August 1809 – Hanged at Sydney for burglary from the house of John Styles on the Hawkesbury.

==== Sydney 1810s ====
- John Campbell – June 1810 – Hanged at Sydney for burglary from the house of Elizabeth Macarthur.
- James Hutchinson – 26 February 1811 – Hanged at Sydney for stealing from the shop of Thomas Abbott. Hutchinson was originally condemned to death in June 1810 for burglary however he escaped from custody, upon being recaptured his sentence was reduced to hard labour. In February 1811 he was convicted along with James Ratty of stealing from commercial premises and both were hanged together.
- James Ratty – 26 February 1811 – Hanged at Sydney for stealing cloth, muslin etc. from the shop of Thomas Abbott.
- Martin Egan – 10 May 1811 – Hanged at Sydney for the murder of Thomas Cooney. After being executed his body was handed over to surgeons for dissection and anatomisation.
- Thomas Clough – 13 May 1811 – Hanged at Sydney for the murder of Thomas Cooney. After being executed his body was handed over to surgeons for dissection and anatomisation.
- John Gould – 9 March 1812 – A soldier of the 73rd Regiment of Foot. Hanged in Sydney for the murder of Margaret Finnie, the wife of a fellow soldier.
- Peter Gory – 21 January 1813 – Hanged at Sydney for robbery at arms of William Parish in Hobart, Van Diemen's Land.
- John McCabe – 21 January 1813 – Hanged at Sydney for robbery at arms of William Parish in Hobart, Van Diemen's Land.
- John Townsend – 21 January 1813 – Hanged at Sydney for robbery at arms of William Parish in Hobart, Van Diemen's Land.
- Matthew Kearns – 24 March 1813 – Hanged at Sydney for aiding and abetting the murder of Joseph Sutton, body handed over for dissection and anatomisation.
- John Kearns (the Elder) – 24 March 1813 – (Brother of Matthew Kearns). Hanged at Sydney for aiding and abetting the murder of Joseph Sutton, body handed over for dissection and anatomisation.
- John Kearns (the Younger) – 24 March 1813 – Hanged at Sydney for aiding and abetting the murder of Joseph Sutton, body handed over for dissection and anatomisation.
- Richard Berry – 31 March 1813 – Hanged at Sydney for cattle stealing.
- John Mahony – 31 March 1813 – Hanged at Sydney for cattle stealing (brother of Thomas Mahony who was hanged on 24 March 1813 in Paramatta for a separate offence).
- Angelo (Giuseppe) LeRose – 13 April 1814 – Hanged at Sydney for the assault and robbery of Samuel Larkin on Parramatta Road, Iron Cove.
- Francis Barry – 13 April 1814 – Hanged at Sydney for stealing three oxen that were the property of the crown.
- Richard Dowling – 13 April 1814 – Hanged at Sydney for stealing three oxen that were the property of the crown.
- Thomas John Turner – 12 July 1814 – Hanged at Sydney for the murder of his wife Elizabeth, whom he stabbed to death at Port Dalrymple, Van Diemen's Land. His body was given up for dissection and anatomisation.
- Bartholomew Foley – 14 July 1814 – Hanged at Sydney for sheep stealing at Launceston, Van Diemen's Land.
- John White – 22 July 1814 – Hanged for his part in the murders of Rowland Edwards and William Jenkins during a botched robbery of the house at the Parramatta Toll Gate. He was accompanied by Dennis Donovan (hanged for other offences on 12 July 1814); it was Donovan who fired the fatal shots. But for his part in the robbery John White was found equally guilty. His body was handed over for dissection and anatomisation.
- Patrick Collins – 20 December 1814 – Hanged at Sydney for his part in the murder of William Alder & Thomas White on the Hawkesbury. Body dissected and anatomised.
- John Shepherd – 20 December 1814 – Hanged at Sydney for the murder of Mary Bryant in The Rocks, Sydney. His body was handed over to surgeons for dissection and anatomisation.
- John Styles – 7 July 1815 – Hanged at Sydney for the murder of Thomas Roberts at Botany Bay. His body was handed over for dissection and anatomisation.
- Colin Hunter – 4 November 1816 – Hanged in Sydney for the murder at Canterbury of John Miller who was shot during a burglary of his home. Body was dissected and anatomised pursuant to sentence.
- Thomas Dooley – 4 November 1816 – Hanged in Sydney for aiding and abetting the murder of John Miller. The prisoner's body was handed over for dissection and anatomisation after he was executed.
- Michael Ryan (real name John Mahony) – 4 November 1816 – Hanged at Sydney for aiding and abetting the murder of John Miller. Body was dissected and anatomised pursuant to sentence.
- James Flavell – 15 November 1816 – Hanged at Sydney for burglary of the house of Thomas Reeds in Castlereagh St.
- William Tripp – 15 November 1816 – Hanged at Sydney for burglary of the house of Thomas Reeds in Castlereagh St.
- John Palmer – 15 November 1816 – Hanged at Sydney for stealing a bullock from the herd of Capt. Eber Bunker at Liverpool.
- Samuel Smith - 3 October 1817 - Hanged at Sydney for the murder of John Randall at George Town, Van Diemen's Land
- John Walker – 10 October 1817 – Hanged at Sydney for the murder of John Suddis at Wilberforce.
- Ralph Pearson – 10 October 1817 – Hanged at Sydney for the murder of John Suddis at Wilberforce.
- Thomas McGiff – 7 November 1817 – Hanged at Sydney for burglary of the house of John Parkes at Petersham.
- Thomas Brown – 7 November 1817 – Hanged at Sydney for stealing a mare, the property of Thomas Arkill.
- Patrick Ducey – 7 November 1817 – Hanged at Sydney for stealing a cow, the property of Patrick Devoy.
- Bartholomew Roach – 7 November 1817 – Hanged at Sydney for stealing two heifers, the property of John Croker.
- William Wallis – 27 February 1818 – Hanged at Sydney for robbery in the house of John Harris.
- Edward Haley – 27 February 1818 – Hanged at Sydney for stealing a horse, cart and other sundries near Parramatta.
- Samuel Pollock – 27 February 1818 – Hanged at Sydney for stealing a horse, cart and other sundries near Parramatta.
- James Fitzpatrick – 27 February 1818 – Hanged at Sydney for burglary in the house of John Brown at Portland Head.
- Pedro Aldanoes (also called Peter Adams) – 7 December 1818 – Hanged at Sydney for the murder of Joseph Yeates outside Parramatta.
- Timothy Buckley – 9 April 1819 – Hanged at Sydney for the murder of district constable William Cosgrove at South Creek.
- David Brown – 9 April 1819 – Hanged at Sydney for aiding and abetting the murder of William Cosgrove.
- Timothy Ford – 9 April 1819 – Hanged at Sydney for aiding and abetting the murder of William Cosgrove.
- Thomas Ray – 16 April 1819 – Hanged at Sydney for highway robbery.
- John Jones – 16 April 1819 – Hanged at Sydney for highway robbery.
- Thomas Smith – 16 April 1819 – Hanged at Sydney for highway robbery.
- John Green – 23 April 1819 – Hanged at Sydney for housebreaking and attempted murder at Cockle Bay.
- John Brennan – 23 April 1819 – Hanged at Sydney for housebreaking and attempted murder at Cockle Bay.
- John Petree (alias McIntosh) – 23 April 1819 – Hanged at Sydney for highway robbery outside Liverpool.
- Matthew Dace - 31 December 1819 - Hanged at Sydney for robbery of Dennis Guiney on the Parramatta Road.
- Robert Parsons - 31 December 1819 - Hanged at Sydney for robbery of Dennis Guiney on the Parramatta Road.

==== Sydney 1820 to 1821 ====
- William Taylor - 14 July 1820 - Hanged at Sydney for burglary in Castlereagh Street.
- James Ingley - 14 July 1820 - Hanged at Sydney for burglary in Castlereagh Street.
- James Garland - 14 July 1820 - Hanged at Sydney for forgery of store receipts at Parramatta.
- Thomas McGowran – 18 August 1820 – Hanged at Sydney for cattle stealing.
- Daniel (or David) Bell – 18 August 1820 – Hanged at Sydney for cattle stealing. Originally transported on the Friendship (1800) for his role in the Irish Rebellion.
- Annesley McGrath – 18 August 1820 – Hanged at Sydney for cattle stealing.
- George Rouse - 25 August 1820 - Hanged at Sydney for burglary from the residence of Lieutenant Hector Macquarie.
- Dennis Malloy - 25 August 1820 - Hanged at Sydney for stealing cattle.
- Thomas Ford (alias Ward) - 25 August 1820 - Hanged at Sydney for burglary from the residence of Anne Robinson on the Parramatta Road.
- John Kirby – 18 December 1820 – Hanged at Sydney for the murder of Burragong, also called Jack, an Indigenous tracker, in the Newcastle district.
- George Bowerman – 22 December 1820 – Hanged at Sydney for highway robbery at the eighteen-mile stone on the Windsor Road.
- James Bowerman – 22 December 1820 – Hanged at Sydney for highway robbery at the eighteen-mile stone on the Windsor Road.
- Solomon Bowerman – 22 December 1820 – Hanged at Sydney for highway robbery at the eighteen-mile stone on the Windsor Road.
- James Clancy (Clency) – 22 December 1820 – Hanged at Sydney for stealing from a house and violent robbery of a child.
- John Bagnell – 22 December 1820 – Hanged at Sydney for house-breaking and highway robbery.
- Nicholas Cooke – 22 December 1820 – Hanged at Sydney for stealing from the house of James Seville near Constitution Hill, and assaulting Constable Edward Dillon with a stone.
- Edward Luffin – 23 December 1820 – Hanged at Sydney for cattle duffing.
- Michael Tracey – 23 December 1820 – Hanged at Sydney for burglary at the house of John Waite.
- John Sullivan – 23 December 1820 – Hanged at Sydney for burglary.
- Daniel O'Brien – 23 December 1820 – Hanged at Sydney for robbery.
- John O'Brien – 23 December 1820 – Hanged at Sydney for cattle duffing.
- William Swift – 17 August 1821 – Hanged at Sydney for the murder of Maria Minton at Richmond.
- James Robinson – 17 August 1821 – Hanged at Sydney for the murder of his overseer Charles Linton. Robinson was from Angola.
- Francis Pascoe – 22 August 1821 – Hanged at Sydney for burglary from the house of Michael Donnelly.
- John Ryan – 22 August 1821 – Hanged at Sydney for highway robbery.
- Miles Jordan – 22 August 1821 – Hanged at Sydney for highway robbery in the Hawkesbury district.
- Pasco Haddycott – 22 August 1821 – Hanged at Sydney for burglary from the house of Michael Donnelly.
- William McGeary (Geary) – 24 August 1821 – Hanged at Sydney for a string of highway robberies on the Windsor Road.
- Thomas Smith – 24 August 1821 – Hanged at Sydney for highway robbery on the Windsor Road.
- John Whiteman – 24 August 1821 – Hanged at Sydney for highway robbery on the Windsor Road.
- William Kennedy – 24 August 1821 – Hanged at Sydney for burglary & theft of a hat, comb and razor from Henry McAlister near Prospect.
- John Mills – 24 August 1821 – Hanged at Sydney for highway robbery on the Windsor Road.
- Charles Young – 24 August 1821 – Hanged at Sydney for highway robbery on the Windsor Road.
- John Cochrane – 24 August 1821 – Hanged at Sydney for highway robbery on the Windsor Road.

==== Sydney 1822 to 1824 ====
- Francis Murphy – 6 April 1822 – Hanged at Sydney for burglary from the house of Nicholas Devine (former Superintendent of Convicts) at what is now Erskineville.
- William Harris – 6 April 1822 – Hanged at Sydney for robbery of James Cribb on the Parramatta Road.
- John Maloney – 1 May 1822 – Hanged at Sydney for robbing the house of John McKenzie at Pitt Town.
- William Varley – 1 May 1822 – Hanged at Sydney for robbing the house of John McKenzie at Pitt Town.
- Thomas Roach – 1 May 1822 – Hanged at Sydney for robbing the house of John McKenzie at Pitt Town.
- George Young – 5 July 1822 – Hanged at Sydney for highway robbery of a cart belonging to John Blaxland at South Creek.
- James Dowden – 5 July 1822 – Hanged at Sydney for burglary from the house of John Sunderland, south of Parramatta.
- Joseph Knowles – 5 July 1822 – Hanged at Sydney for burglary from John Price's residence at the Parramatta Toll-House.
- George Barke – 5 July 1822 – Hanged at Sydney for burglary from John Price's residence at the Parramatta Toll-House.
- Thomas Barry – 14 October 1822 – Hanged at Sydney for the murder of Samuel and Esther Bradley at Birchgrove.
- Valentine Wood – 8 November 1822 – Hanged at Sydney for robbing Sergeant Barlow on the Prospect Road.
- William Baxter – 8 November 1822 – Hanged at Sydney for attempted murder of Robert Hawkins on the Dog Trap Road.
- Thomas Till – 8 November 1822 – Hanged at Sydney for stealing a boat at Port Macquarie.
- William Poole – 22 May 1823 – Hanged at Sydney for returning from Port Macquarie in defiance of his commuted sentence. Originally sentenced to death for leading a party of convicts in escape into the hinterland, in the hope they could walk to Timor.
- Edward Gorman – 13 October 1823 – Hanged at Sydney for the murder of William Wells during a robbery at Minto. Gorman was recognisable for his "remarkable tooth".
- Robert Grant – 15 January 1824 – Hanged at Sydney for returning from Port Macquarie in defiance of his commuted sentence. Originally condemned to death in 1822 for horse theft.
- Thomas Harley – 4 March 1824 – Hanged at Sydney for returning from Port Macquarie in defiance of his commuted sentence. Originally sentenced to death in 1822 for burglary from the house of Robert Campbell in George St.
- Cornelius Fitzpatrick – 28 June 1824 – Hanged at Sydney for the murder of John Bentley outside Newcastle.
- John Donovan – 23 August 1824 – Hanged at Sydney for the murder of Tom Brown at Emu Plains.
- John Hand – 30 August 1824 – Hanged at Sydney for the murder of Michael Minton at Richmond.
- James Stack – 30 August 1824 – Hanged at Sydney for the murder of Michael Minton at Richmond.

==== Sydney 1825 to 1826 ====
- Martin Benson – 23 January 1825 – Hanged at Sydney for the murder of his master John Brackfield at South Creek near Windsor.
- Eliza Campbell – 23 January 1825 – Hanged at Sydney for the murder of her master John Brackfield at South Creek, near Windsor.
- James Coogan – 23 January 1825 – Hanged at Sydney for the murder of his master John Brackfield at South Creek, near Windsor.
- Anthony Rodney – 23 January 1825 – Hanged at Sydney for the murder of his master John Brackfield at South Creek, near Windsor.
- John Sprole – 23 January 1825 – Hanged at Sydney for the murder of his master John Brackfield at South Creek, near Windsor.
- Jeremiah Buckley – 4 April 1825 – Hanged at Sydney for burglary at Canterbury.
- Edmond Bates – 11 April 1825 – Hanged at Sydney for beating his wife Julia to death during a Christmas Day drunken rage at Kissing Point.
- James Wright – 30 May 1825 – Hanged at Sydney for the axe murder of his wife Mary Ann at the Hawkesbury.
- James Webb – 19 August 1825 – Hanged at Sydney for the murder of Robert Collett at Toongabbie.
- Patrick Moloney – 12 September 1825 – Hanged at Sydney for the murder of William Elliott at Port Macquarie.
- Daniel Leary - 12 December 1825 - Hanged at Sydney for rape of Mary Grainger at Wallis Plains.
- John Burke – 6 March 1826 – Hanged at Sydney for the murder of John Cogan at Mulgoa.
- William Corbett – 6 March 1826 – Hanged at Sydney for highway robbery on the Great Western Road.
- Duncan McCallum – 7 March 1826 – Hanged at Sydney for robbery at South Creek.
- Peter Roberts – 7 March 1826 – Hanged at Sydney for robbery at South Creek.
- William Patient – 7 March 1826 – Hanged at Sydney for robbery at South Creek.
- William Morrison – 7 March 1826 – Hanged at Sydney for robbery at South Creek.
- Andrew White – 1 May 1826 – Hanged at Sydney for the murder of Patrick Taggart at Grant's Creek, outside Bathurst.
- William Cusack – 3 July 1826 – Hanged at Sydney for burglary at Campbelltown.
- John Hossle – 3 July 1826 – Hanged at Sydney for burglary of John Blackman at Bathurst.
- Bridget Fairless – 12 July 1826 – Hanged at Sydney for highway robbery in what is now the Leichhardt section of Parramatta Road.
- John Connolly (Collins) – 12 July 1826 – Hanged at Sydney for highway robbery in what is now the Leichhardt section of Parramatta Road.
- Charles Butler – 3 August 1826 – Hanged at Sydney for the murder of Kitty Carman (Catherine Collins) at Portland Head.
- Joseph Lockett – 7 August 1826 – Hanged at Sydney for highway robbery on the Liverpool Road near Cabramatta.
- Isaac Smith – 11 September 1826 – Hanged at Sydney for the murder of Constable William Green at Captain John Brabyn's estate, Clifton, Windsor.

==== Sydney 1827 ====
- George Worrall (Fisher's Ghost Murder) – 5 February 1827 – Hanged at Sydney for the murder of Frederick Fisher at Campbelltown.
- William Leddington – 12 March 1827 – Hanged at Sydney for piracy on the brig Wellington at Norfolk Island
- James Smith – 12 March 1827 – Hanged at Sydney for piracy on the brig Wellington at Norfolk Island
- John Edwards – 12 March 1827 – Hanged at Sydney for piracy on the brig Wellington at Norfolk Island
- Richard Johnson – 12 March 1827 – Hanged at Sydney for piracy on the brig Wellington at Norfolk Island
- Edward Coulthurst – 12 March 1827 – Hanged at Sydney for piracy on the brig Wellington at Norfolk Island
- William Ward - 21 May 1827 - Hanged at Sydney for the armed robbery of Michael Foley at Bringelly
- Thomas Power - 21 May 1827 - Hanged at Sydney for the armed robbery of Michael Foley at Bringelly
- John Curry - 21 May 1827 - Hanged at Sydney for highway robbery of Joseph Cox on the road between Liverpool and Parramatta
- William Webb - 21 May 1827 - Hanged at Sydney for the armed robbery and putting in fear of the house of Timothy Beard at Carnes Hill
- John Lynch - 18 June 1827 - Hanged at Sydney for the burglary of the house of Thomas Parnell at Richmond. Lynch was also involved in the Wellington mutiny.
- Michael Coogan - 18 June 1827 - Hanged at Sydney for forgery. Coogan was an American who had also attempted piracy of a ship called The Liberty
- Thomas Quinn - 18 June 1827 - Hanged at Sydney for burglary from the house of Timothy Beard at Carnes Hill. Before the noose was fastened Quinn kicked off his boots "and they fell with a hollow sound on his coffin, which lay directly under".
- Patrick Geary - 18 June 1827 - Hanged at Sydney for burglary from the house of Timothy Beard at Carnes Hill
- John Goff - 24 September 1827 - Hanged at Sydney for murder while attempting escape on Norfolk Island.
- Edward Moore - 24 September 1827 - Hanged at Sydney for murder while attempting escape on Norfolk Island.
- William Watson - 24 September 1827 - Hanged at Sydney for murder while attempting escape on Norfolk Island.
- Black Tommy – 31 December 1827 – (sometimes called Jackey-Jackey) Wiradjuri man from Bathurst district, hanged at Sydney for the murder of Geoffrey Connell at Reedy Swamp, near Bathurst.
- William Lee – 31 December 1827 – Hanged at Sydney for stealing in the dwelling-house of John Coghill, and putting the inmates in bodily fear.
- Jon Carrington – 31 December 1827 – Hanged at Sydney for stealing in the dwelling-house of John Coghill, and putting the inmates in bodily fear.
- James Charlton – 31 December 1827 – Hanged at Sydney for stealing in the dwelling-house of John Coghill, and putting the inmates in bodily fear.
- William (or Michael) Pearce – 31 December 1827 – Hanged at Sydney for burglary and robbery in the house of Francis Forbes at Liverpool.

==== Sydney 1828 ====
- Charles Connor – 13 March 1828 – Hanged at Sydney for burglary from the house of James Mackenzie at Windsor.
- Lot McNamara – 17 March 1828 – Hanged at Sydney for the murder of Janet Mackellar, wife of Duncan Mackellar, Junior, at Minto.
- William Johnson – 24 March 1828 – Hanged at Sydney Gaol for the murder of Morris Morgan at Moreton Bay.
- George Kilroy (Kildray, Gilroy, Kilray) – 24 March 1828 – An associate of Jack Donahue. Hanged at Sydney for highway robbery of George Plomer on the Richmond Road.
- William Smith – 24 March 1828 – An associate of Jack Donahue. Hanged at Sydney for highway robbery of George Plomer on the Richmond road. On the first attempt the rope snapped and Smith fell to the ground. He was taken away until Kilroy and Johnson were declared dead and their corpses removed, then he was hanged again.
- William Regan – 5 May 1828 – Hanged at Sydney for the murder of James Davis in Castlereagh St.
- John Timmins – 11 June 1828 – Hanged at Sydney for robbery of Stephen Hunter at Cornwallis.
- Thomas Ford – 11 June 1828 – Hanged at Sydney for robbery of Stephen Hunter at Cornwallis.
- John Curtis – 16 June 1828 – Hanged at Sydney for the theft of a cow from the herd of William Wentworth, at Bringelly.
- James (or Joseph) Johnson (also called Philip Macauley, Phillip Gawley) – 16 June 1828 – Hanged at Sydney for highway robbery and assault of George Tills outside Liverpool.
- John Welsh – 20 October 1828 – Hanged at Sydney for the robbery and attempted murder of George Barber at Picton.
- Joseph Bradley – 20 October 1828 – Hanged at Sydney for forgery.
- Patrick Troy – 20 October 1828 – Hanged at Sydney for forgery.
- Patrick Kegney (sometimes Stegney) – 20 October 1828 – Hanged at Sydney for putting in fear and robbery.
- Joseph (John) Spicer – 20 October 1828 – Hanged at Sydney for putting in fear and robbery.
- John (James) Tomlins – 20 October 1828 – Hanged at Sydney for putting in fear and robbery.
- James Henry – 20 October 1828 – Hanged at Sydney for the theft of a cow at Stone Quarry Creek.
- Samuel Clarke – 20 October 1828 – Hanged at Sydney for putting in fear and burglary from the house of Stephen Hunter at Cornwallis.
- Thomas Quigley – 20 October 1828 – Hanged at Sydney for putting in fear and burglary from the house of Stephen Hunter at Cornwallis.
- Alexander Browne – 22 December 1828 – Hanged at Sydney for sodomy with William Lyster on the whaler Royal Sovereign.
- John Welch – 22 December 1828 – Hanged at Sydney for highway robbery and the armed assault of Constable William Wade at Bong Bong. Welch was about sixteen at the time of his execution. "He cried bitterly".
- William Bayne – 22 December 1828 – Hanged at Sydney for highway robbery and armed assault of Constable Wade at Bong Bong.
- Thomas Whisken (or Wiscott) – 22 December 1828 – Hanged at Sydney for the armed robbery of the home of James Hassall at Bathurst.
- William Owens – 22 December 1828 – Hanged at Sydney for the armed robbery of the home of James Hassall at Bathurst.
- James Holmes – 22 December 1828 – Hanged at Sydney for the armed robbery of the home of James Hassall at Bathurst.
- John Iron – 22 December 1828 – Hanged at Sydney for the robbery of John Browne at Botany.
- Thomas Ryan – 29 December 1828 – Hanged at Sydney for the murder of James McGrath just north of Richmond.

==== Sydney 1829 ====
- Michael Green – 12 January 1829 – Hanged at Sydney for burglary from the house of Susannah Smith at Windsor.
- John Payne (sometimes Paid) – 12 January 1829 – Hanged at Sydney for putting in fear and robbery from the house of Timothy Beard at Carnes Hill.
- Edward Whelan – 12 January 1829 – Hanged at Sydney for putting in fear and robbery from the house of Timothy Beard at Carnes Hill.
- George Skinner – 12 January 1829 – Hanged at Sydney for burglary from the house of Susannah Smith at Windsor.
- John Price – 12 January 1829 – Hanged at Sydney for burglary from the house of Susannah Smith at Windsor.
- Michael Lynch – 12 January 1829 – Hanged at Sydney for burglary from the house of Thomas Kendall at Pitt Town.
- Florence (or Henry) Driscoll – 12 January 1829 – Hanged at Sydney for burglary from the house of Isaac Cornwall at Richmond.
- Lot Molds – 12 January 1829 – Hanged at Sydney for burglary from the house of Thomas Kendall at Pitt Town.
- William Riddell – 23 March 1829 – Hanged at Sydney for the murder of John Heley in the Muswellbrook district. Riddell apparently desired Heley's wife; Heley was found dismembered in a stump hole. Riddell was an atheist, republican, radical, autodidact. He ran up the steps to the gallows, took snuff and said "I prefer death to living in chains and fetters in such a country as this".
- Charles White – 8 April 1829 – Hanged at Sydney for the murder of Thomas Murphy at Luskintyre.
- John Brunger (also called Brugan/Burgen) – 18 Apr 1829 – Hanged at Sydney for the murder of William Perfoot (also called Parfitt) at Moreton Bay.
- Thomas Matthews – 18 April 1829 – Hanged at Sydney for the murder of Connolly, a fellow work-gang member, at Moreton Bay.
- Thomas Allen – 18 April 1829 – Hanged at Sydney for the murder of Connolly, a fellow work-gang member, at Moreton Bay.
- Patrick Sullivan – 20 April 1829 – Hanged at Sydney for the murder of Michael Condron at Moreton Bay.
- William Bowen – 27 April 1829 – Hanged at Sydney for putting in fear and burglary from the house of Leslie Duguid at Wallis Plains (East Maitland).
- Peter Reilly – 27 April 1829 – Hanged at Sydney for putting in fear and burglary from the house of Ellis Hall at Wallis Plains.
- James Smart – 27 April 1829 – Hanged at Sydney for putting in fear and burglary from the home of John Thomas at Wallis Plains.
- James Gallagher – 27 April 1829 – Hanged at Sydney for putting in fear and burglary from the house of John Thomas at Wallis Plains.
- John Crowther – 27 April 1829 – Hanged at Sydney for putting in fear and burglary from the house of John Thomas at Wallis Plains.
- Thomas Slater – 27 April 1829 – Hanged at Sydney for assault on Betty Griffiths with a tomahawk in Cumberland St. Sydney.
- William Yemms (Jems) – 27 April 1829 – Hanged at Sydney for putting in fear and burglary from the government stores at Port Macquarie.
- James Gardiner – 27 April 1829 – Hanged at Sydney for putting in fear and burglary from the government stores at Port Macquarie.
- William Davison – 4 May 1829 – Hanged at Sydney for stealing cattle from James Laidley at Bathurst.
- John Whelan – 4 May 1829 – Hanged at Sydney for stealing cattle from James Laidley at Bathurst.
- John Shorter – 4 May 1829 – Hanged at Sydney for stealing cattle from James Laidley at Bathurst.
- George Smith – 4 May 1829 – Hanged at Sydney for burglary in the Illawarra district.
- John Allwright – 4 May 1829 – Hanged at Sydney for burglary in the Illawarra district.
- George McDonald – 4 May 1829 – Hanged at Sydney for burglary and putting in fear in the Illawarra district.
- James Naughton – 25 May 1829 – Hanged at Sydney for the murder of Elizabeth Watson. He was previously charged, with Edward Gorman, with murder in 1823.
- Timothy Murphy – 1 June 1829 – Hanged at Sydney for the axe-murder of fellow-convict John Monaghan at Mt York while they were working on the road to Bathurst.
- John Slack (alias York) – 22 June 1829 – Hanged at Sydney for putting in fear and burglary at the house of Timothy Beard at Cabramatta.
- George Groves – 8 July 1829 – Hanged at Sydney for burglary of the house of Richard Brooks at Denham Court.
- James McColville – 8 July 1829 – Hanged at Sydney for burglary of the house of Richard Brooks at Denham Court.
- John Salt – 8 July 1829 – Hanged at Sydney for highway robbery of Ben Crow in the Bargo Brush.
- Richard Peacock – 8 July 1829 – Hanged at Sydney for highway robbery of Ben Crow in the Bargo Brush.
- William Pitts – 8 July 1829 – Hanged at Sydney for highway robbery of Ben Crow in the Bargo Brush.
- John Neilson – 8 July 1829 – Hanged at Sydney for burglary at Windsor.
- James Barnes – 13 July 1829 – Hanged at Sydney for highway robbery of Joshua Moore on the Liverpool Road.
- Joseph Stephenson – 13 July 1829 – Hanged at Sydney for highway robbery of Joshua Moore on the Liverpool Road.
- Daniel Grier – 28 September 1829 – Hanged at Sydney for burglary.
- Charles Penson (Tinson, Tinsal) – 28 September 1829 – Hanged at Sydney for burglary
- Joseph Parker – 28 September 1829 – Hanged at Sydney for the murder of John "Kangaroo Jack" Hazeldine at Gibraltar Creek in the Cox's River district.
- George Williams – 22 October 1829 – Hanged at Sydney for the highway robbery, assault and battery of William Hickey
- John Sly – 28 December 1829 – Hanged at Sydney for forgery

==== Sydney 1830 ====
- Thomas Finley – 11 January 1830 – Hanged at Sydney for the murder of overseer Edward Walsh at Bathurst.
- Stephen Smith – 5 April 1830 – Hanged at Sydney for the axe-murder of fellow convict William Davis at Moreton Bay.
- John Hawes (alias Lloyd) – 5 April 1830 – Hanged at Sydney for the axe-murder of fellow convict William Davis at Moreton Bay.
- Henry Muggleton – 31 May 1830 – Hanged at Sydney for the murder of Mark King at Moreton Bay.
- Daniel Kirwan (Curwen) – 7 June 1830 – Hanged at Sydney for the murder of a constable on the Windsor Road.
- John Martin – 7 June 1830 – Known as 'Jack the Drummer'. Hanged at Sydney for the rape of seven-year-old Eliza Deering in a yard off George Street.
- Michael Toole – 7 June 1830 – Hanged at Sydney for burglary and putting in fear at Pitt Water.
- Thomas McCormick – 21 June 1830 – Hanged at Sydney for burglary and putting the occupants in fear.
- Jack Field – 23 June 1830 – Hanged at Sydney for highway robbery of John Pike between Parramatta and Toongabbie.
- Henry O'Neil – 23 June 1830 – Hanged at Sydney for highway robbery of John Pike between Parramatta and Toongabbie.
- Harry Cade – 23 June 1830 – Hanged at Sydney for highway robbery of John Pike between Parramatta and Prospect. Cade was transported at the age of fourteen and executed after he turned sixteen.
- William Dalton – 28 June 1830 – Hanged at Sydney for highway robbery of John Ellison near Parramatta.
- William Coleman – 13 December 1830 – Hanged at Sydney for robbing his master Samuel Terry. Coleman stole money and buried it in a bottle in Terry's garden.

=== Parramatta ===
Parramatta was named Rose Hill until June 1791.

- William Harris – 28 October 1790 – Broke into a house in Rose Hill and assaulted one of the occupants, stole three pounds of beef and one pound of flour, a frock and a book. He was publicly hanged at Rose Hill.
- Edward Wildblood – 28 October 1790 – A co-offender with the aforementioned William Harris, he was convicted of breaking into a house in Rose Hill, assaulting one of the occupants and stealing three pounds of beef and one pound of flour, a frock and a book. He was publicly hanged at Rose Hill.
- James Derry – 19 September 1796 – Hanged at Parramatta for robbing the public stores.
- Matthew McNally – 1 December 1796 – Hanged at Parramatta for robbing the public stores.
- Thomas Doyle – 1 December 1796 – Hanged at Parramatta for robbing the public stores.
- George Mitton – 1798 – Hanged at Rose Hill (Parramatta) for robbery.
- Simon Taylor – 20 May 1799 – Hanged at Parramatta for the murder of his wife Anne Taylor.
- Richard Weston – May or June 1800 – Hanged at Parramatta for vagrancy and theft.
- Charles Hill – 8 March 1804 – Freeman who participated in the Castle Hill Rebellion. Hanged at Parramatta
- Samuel Humes/Hughes – 8 March 1804 – Convict, a principal and informant who participated in the Castle Hill Rebellion. Executed at Parramatta, then gibbeted.
- John Place – 8 March 1804 – Convict who participated in the Castle Hill Rebellion. Hanged at Parramatta.
- Patrick McDermot – 19 May 1806 – Hanged at Parramatta for burglary from the house of Matthew Pearce at Seven Hills and theft of clothing items.
- John Kenny – 24 January 1807 – Hanged and gibbetted at the scene of the crime in Parramatta for the murder of Mary Smith.
- Michael Bagan – 20 June 1808 – Entered the house of Jane Codd near Parramatta, assaulted her and stole items from her home. Hanged at the Parramatta brickfields.
- Felix Donnelly – 20 June 1808 – Entered the house of Jane Codd near Parramatta, assaulted her and stole items from her home. Hanged at the Parramatta brickfields.
- John Dunn – 25 August 1811 – Hanged at Parramatta for the murder of Mary Rowe, his body was handed over to the medical officer at Parramatta General Hospital for dissection and anatomisation.
- Pearce Conden – 24 March 1813 – Publicly hanged at the site of the crime in George St Parramatta for the murder of Joseph Sutton. Body handed over for dissection and anatomisation.
- Thomas Mahony – 24 March 1813 – Publicly hanged at the site of the crime in George St Parramatta for the murder of Joseph Sutton. Body handed over for dissection and anatomisation.
- Matthew Craven – 16 October 1826 – Publicly hanged outside Parramatta for 'divers robberies'.
- Thomas Cavanaugh – 16 October 1826 – Publicly hanged outside Parramatta for armed robberies.
- Thomas (John) Ashton – 2 December 1829 – Hanged at Parramatta for rape of ten-year-old Elizabeth Price.

=== Castle Hill ===
- Patrick Gannon – 23 March 1803 – Hanged at Castle Hill for rape, attempted murder and robbery.
- Francis Simpson – 23 March 1803 – Hanged along with Patrick Gannon at Castle Hill for robbery.
- John Lynch – 27 September 1803 – Hanged at Castle Hill for the assault and robbery of Samuel Phelps at Hawkesbury.
- James Tracey – 27 September 1803 – Hanged at Castle Hill for the assault and robbery of Samuel Phelps at Hawkesbury.
- William Johnston – 9 March 1804 – Convict, a principal along with Phillip Cunningham in the Castle Hill Rebellion. Executed at Castle Hill, then gibbeted.
- John Neal – 9 March 1804 – Convict who participated in the Castle Hill Rebellion. Hanged at the Government Farm, Castle Hill.
- George Harrington – 9 March 1804 – Convict who participated in the Castle Hill Rebellion. Hanged at the Government Farm, Castle Hill.

=== Hawkesbury & Windsor ===
- Thomas McLaughlane (the elder) – 7 October 1803 – Hanged at Hawkesbury, for robbery with violence at the house of John Palmer at Hawkesbury.
- Phillip Cunningham – 5 March 1804 – Convict, leader of the Castle Hill Rebellion. Summarily hanged on the steps of the government storehouse at Greenhills (present day Windsor).
- James Davis – 19 June 1810 – Hanged at Portland Head (Hawkesbury) for burglary from the house of John Cox.
- Thomas Begley – 31 August 1829 – Hanged at Windsor for burglary at Mulgoa.
- Michael Rafter – 29 January 1830 – Hanged at Windsor for a litany of burglaries in the Portland Head district.
- John Smith – 29 January 1830 – Hanged at Windsor for rape of his seven-year-old daughter.
- John Tiernan – 25 August 1830 – Hanged at Windsor for highway robbery, horse theft and stealing. Aged seventeen, Tiernan objected to being interrupted in his prayers on the scaffold and wrestled the executioner over the edge of the platform.

=== Newcastle ===
- John Pagan – 7 January 1820 – Hanged at Newcastle for the murder of James White.
- William Smith – 7 January 1820 – Hanged at Newcastle for the murder of James White.

=== Burwood ===
- Daniel Watkins – 16 October 1826 – Publicly hanged at Burwood for the armed robbery of Thomas Bartie Clay at Burwood.
- Thomas Mustin (Muston) – 16 October 1826 – Publicly hanged at Burwood for robbery and putting in fear at the house of Richard Morgan on the Liverpool Road.
- John Brown – 16 October 1826 – Publicly hanged at Burwood for robbery and putting in fear at the house of Richard Morgan on the Liverpool Road.

=== Bankstown ===
- Patrick Sullivan – 18 October 1826 – Publicly hanged on gallows constructed in Bankstown ('Irish Town', now Bass Hill) for bushranging.
- James Moran – 18 October 1826 – Publicly hanged on gallows constructed in Bankstown ('Irish Town', now Bass Hill) for bushranging.

=== Campbelltown ===
- John Holmes – 21 August 1829 – Hanged at Campbelltown for setting fire to a barn belonging to James Bean at Campbelltown.
- Richard McCann – 6 February 1830 – Hanged at Campbelltown for theft, assault and putting in fear in the Goulburn district
- Thomas Beasley - 8 February 1830 - Hanged at Campbelltown for burglary with assault in the Airds district
- Joseph Moorbee (Mowerby, alias Nuttall) - 8 February 1830 - Hanged at Campbelltown for burglary with assault in the Airds district
- Mark Byfield – 8 March 1830 – Hanged at Sydney for the theft of a silver watch
- Broger – 30 August 1830 – Indigenous. Publicly hanged at Campbelltown for the murder of John Rivett at Kangaroo Valley
- Peter Dew (alias Saunders) – 31 August 1830 – Hanged at Campbelltown for burglary and putting in fear at Goulburn
- William Haggerty – 31 August 1830 – Hanged at Campbelltown for cattle theft from Francis Lawless in the Liverpool district
- John Spellary – 31 August 1830 – Hanged at Campbelltown for cattle theft from Francis Lawless in the Liverpool district
- James Welsh – 31 August 1830 – Hanged at Campbelltown for burglary from the house of David Reece at Burra Burra, near Taralga.

=== Maitland ===
- Michael Brown – 1 September 1829 – Hanged at Maitland for burglary and putting in fear at the house of William Forsyth.
- Patrick Corcoran – 1 September 1829 – Hanged at Maitland for burglary and putting in fear at the house of William Forsyth.
- Andrew Cullen – 1 September 1829 – Hanged at Maitland for burglary and putting in fear at the house of William Forsyth.
- Richard Turnstyle – 1 September 1829 – Hanged at Maitland for burglary and putting in fear at the house of William Forsyth.
- William Chandler – 1 September 1829 – Hanged at Maitland for horse theft from Peter Cunningham at Merton (near Denman).

=== Liverpool ===
- Jean Herman Maas – 1 September 1830 – Hanged at Liverpool for forgery.
- James McGibbon – 1 September 1830 – Hanged at Liverpool for forgery.

=== Bathurst ===
- Ralph Entwistle ("The Ribbon Gang") – 2 November 1830 – Hanged at Bathurst town centre for the murder of John Greenwood near present-day Georges Plains, bushranging and horse theft
- Thomas Dunne ("The Ribbon Gang")- 2 November 1830 – Hanged at Bathurst for the murder of John Greenwood, bushranging and horse theft
- Dominic Daley ("The Ribbon Gang") – 2 November 1830 – Hanged at Bathurst town centre for plundering houses, bushranging and horse theft
- James Driver ("The Ribbon Gang") – 2 November 1830 – Hanged at Bathurst town centre for plundering houses, bushranging and horse theft
- William Gahan ("The Ribbon Gang") – 2 November 1830 – Hanged at Bathurst town centre for the murder of John Greenwood, bushranging and horse theft
- Patrick Gleeson ("The Ribbon Gang") – 2 November 1830 – Hanged at Bathurst town centre for the murder of John Greenwood, bushranging and horse theft
- Michael Kearney ("The Ribbon Gang")- 2 November 1830 – Hanged at Bathurst town centre for the murder of John Greenwood, bushranging and horse theft
- John Kenny ("The Ribbon Gang") – 2 November 1830 – Hanged at Bathurst town centre for plundering houses, bushranging and horse theft
- John Shepherd ("The Ribbon Gang") – 2 November 1830 – Hanged at Bathurst town centre for the murder of John Greenwood, bushranging and horse theft
- Robert Webster ("The Ribbon Gang") – 2 November 1830 – Hanged at Bathurst town centre for plundering houses, bushranging and horse theft.

== 1830s ==
=== 1831 ===
- William Bubb – 10 January 1831 – Hanged at Sydney for the murder of Adam Oliver at Norfolk Island.
- John Cook – 10 January 1831 – Hanged at Sydney for the murder of Adam Oliver at Norfolk Island.
- James Murphy – 10 January 1831 – Hanged at Sydney for the murder of Adam Oliver at Norfolk Island
- John Mason - 15 January 1831 - Hanged at Sydney for armed robberies at Kingdon Ponds (near Scone) and Liverpool Plains
- Edward Bowen – 15 January 1831 – Hanged at Sydney for burglary and putting in fear in the house of John Town, Upper Hunter (Goulburn River).
- Hugh Duffy – 15 January 1831 – Hanged for burglary and putting in fear at the house of John Town.
- Patrick Feeney – 15 January 1831 – Hanged for burglary and putting in fear at the house of John Town.
- Lawrence Moore – 11 July 1831 – Hanged at Sydney Gaol for burglary and putting in fear, at the farm of Gregory Blaxland at Wollongong
- Thomas Kite – 11 July 1831 – Hanged at Sydney Gaol for burglary and putting in fear, at the farm of Gregory Blaxland at Wollongong
- Dennis Kelly – 11 July 1831 – Hanged at Sydney Gaol for burglary and putting in fear, at the farm of Gregory Blaxland at Wollongong
- Anthony Connor – 11 July 1831 – Hanged at Sydney Gaol for burglary and putting in fear, at the farm of Gregory Blaxland at Wollongong.
- David O'Hara – 11 July 1831 – Hanged at Sydney Gaol for burglary and putting in fear at the house of James Raymond.
- Thomas Woolley – 11 July 1831 – Hanged at Sydney Gaol for burglary and putting in fear at the house of James Raymond.
- John Welch – 11 July 1831 – Hanged at Sydney Gaol for attempted murder at Norfolk Island.
- Joseph Crampton – 11 July 1831 – Hanged at Sydney Gaol for highway robbery with violence of George Cubitt at Parramatta.
- Charles McManus – 18 July 1831 – Hanged at Sydney for the attempted murder of John Norman at Moreton Bay.
- John Thomas – 18 July 1831 – Hanged at Sydney for cattle stealing in the Menangle Park area.
- James Ready – 18 July 1831 – Hanged at Sydney for burglary at Annandale.
- William Webber – 18 July 1831 – Hanged at Sydney for highway robbery on the road from South Creek to Parramatta.
- John Roberts – 5 September 1831 – Hanged at Sydney for the murder of James McIlroy (James Michael Roy) at Patterson's Plains. Roberts was Welsh and spoke little English. His corpse was sent for dissection but the remains were crudely discarded and were found scattered in the Domain.
- John Leadbeater (alias Onions) – 23 September 1831 – Hanged at Sydney for the murder of John Maxwell at Patterson's Plains.
- Thomas Lucas – 23 September 1831 – Hanged for the murder of Constable Robert "Long Bob" Watersworth in the West Pennant Hills area.
- David Pegg – 26 September 1831 – Hanged at Sydney for burglary and putting in fear in the Hunter Valley.
- Richard Anscombe – 26 September 1831 – Hanged at Sydney for burglary and putting in fear in the Hunter Valley.
- Hugh Carberry – 26 September 1831 – Hanged at Sydney for theft of a horse and cattle.

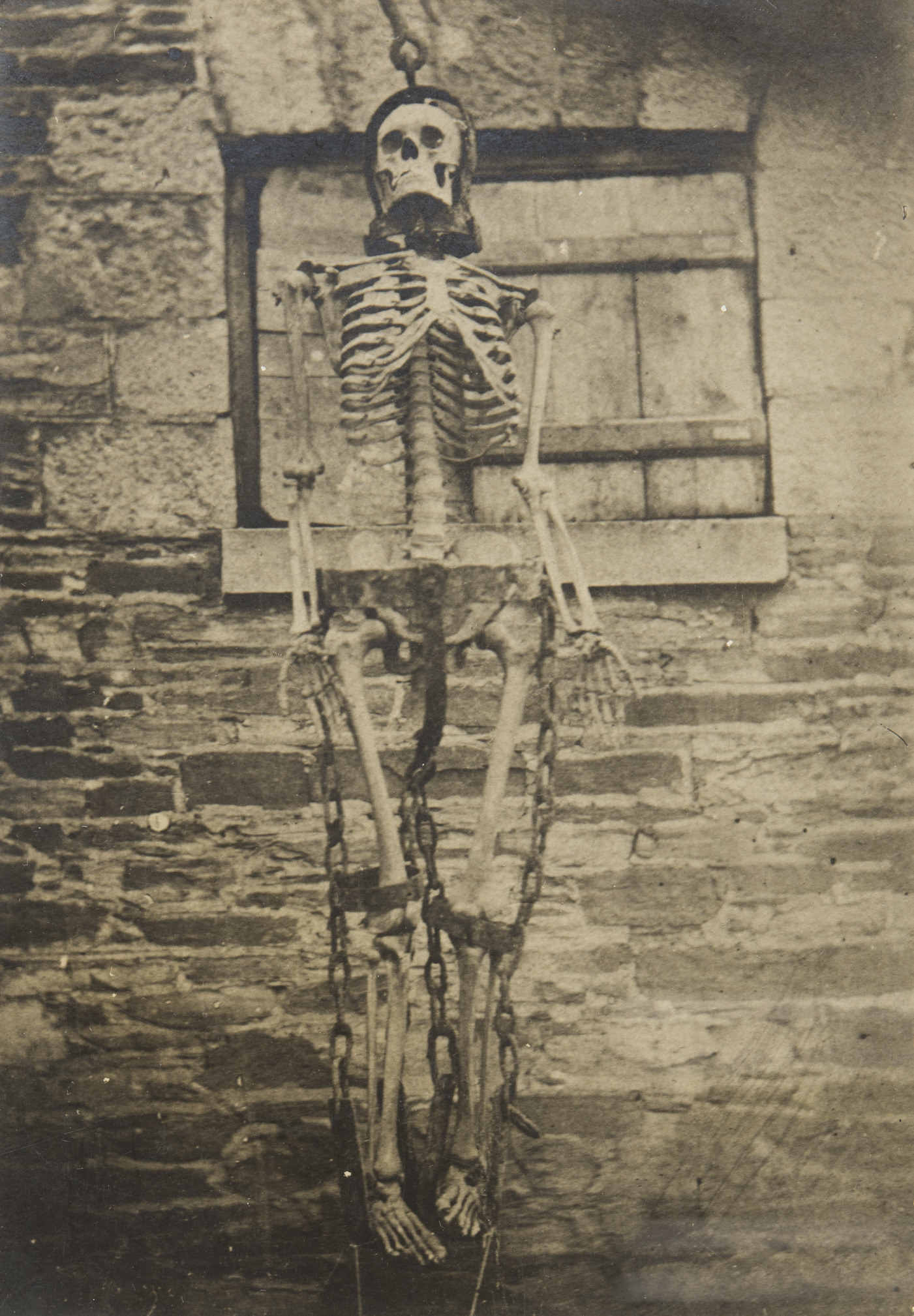
Skeleton and chains used to gibbet a man (William Mooney or John White) convicted of murder and hung at Goulburn in 1831 (Mitchell Library, State Library of New South Wales)

- William Mooney – 16 November 1831 – Publicly hanged on the outskirts of Goulburn for the murder of his overseer Maurice Roach near Crookwell. Body hung in gibbet until ordered buried by Governor Bourne in 1833.
- John White – 16 November 1831 – Publicly hanged on the outskirts of Goulburn for the murder of his overseer Maurice Roach near Crookwell. Body hung in gibbet until ordered buried by Governor Bourne in 1833.
- Edward Slingsby – 21 November 1831 – Hanged at Sydney Gaol for the murder of William Payne at Dunn's Plains, outside Rockley.
- Michael Lynch – 21 November 1831 – Hanged at Sydney Gaol for aiding and abetting the murder of William Payne.
- Denis O'Brien – 21 November 1831 – Hanged at Sydney Gaol for aiding and abetting the murder of William Payne.

=== 1832 to 1833 ===
- Charles Smithwick – 27 February 1832 – Hanged at Sydney for the murder of George Miller at Razorback.
- Patrick McGuire – 5 March 1832 – Hanged at Sydney for the murder of fellow convict Matthew Gallagher at Moreton Bay.
- Thomas Wood (alias Carberry) – 8 March 1832 – Hanged for highway robbery outside Parramatta.
- Patrick Burke – 14 March 1832 – Bushranger. Publicly hanged at the scene of his crime for highway robbery at Appin.
- Thomas Brennan – 6 April 1832 – Shot by military firing squad at Dawes Battery, Sydney. A private soldier of His Majesty's 39th Regiment of Foot, Brennan had fired at his sergeant with the intent of killing him.
- John Hammell – 7 May 1832 – Hanged at Sydney for the murder of his overseer George Williamson with a spade at Grose Farm (today Sydney University).
- John Fitzsimmons – 14 June 1832 – Hanged at Sydney for arson. (Fitzsimmons set ablaze a stack of wheat at Penrith).
- John Troy – 18 August 1832 – Hanged at Sydney for highway robbery and burglary at Canterbury.
- Thomas Smith – 18 August 1832 – Hanged at Sydney for highway robbery and burglary at Canterbury.
- Edward Kennedy – 23 August 1832 – Hanged at Sydney for divers highway robberies at Parramatta and Cabramatta.
- Edward Fordham – 5 November 1832 – Hanged at Sydney for the murder of Thomas Bradford at Lower Minto.
- Russell Crawford – 8 December 1832 – Hanged at Sydney for highway robbery of George Suttor on the Windsor Road.
- James Lockhard – 4 February 1833 – Hanged at Sydney for the murder of Murdoch Campbell in the Narellan area.
- Patrick Brady – 11 February 1833 – Hanged at Sydney for the murder of Daniel Stewart at Webb's Creek, Windsor.
- John Walsh – 11 February 1833 – Hanged at Sydney for the murder of Henry Kenyon at Bathurst.
- James Dwyer – 11 February 1833 – Hanged at Sydney for the murder of Henry Dawkins at Bathurst.
- John Bowen – 7 March 1833 – Hanged at Sydney for burglary and putting in fear at Inverary.
- Joseph Coleman – 18 March 1833 – Hanged at Old Banks, Paterson Plains for the attempted murder of Edward Cory.
- William Carney – 20 May 1833 – Hanged at Sydney for the murder of Michael Keith at Penrith.
- William Jones – 23 May 1833 – Hanged at Sydney for highway robbery on the Liverpool Road.
- Robert Mullins – 23 May 1833 – Hanged at Sydney for highway robbery on the Liverpool Road.
- Patrick Neagle (Nangle, Naigle)– 23 May 1833 – Hanged at Sydney for highway robbery on the Liverpool Road
- Edward Green – 27 May 1833 – Hanged at Sydney for the murder of Edward Edwards at a shop in Pitt St.
- Richard Long – 11 July 1833 – Hanged at Sydney for highway robbery on the Dog Trap Road.
- Henry Cook – 11 July 1833 – Hanged at Sydney for highway robbery on the Dog Trap Road.
- John Richardson – 5 August 1833 – Hanged at Sydney for highway robbery at Maitland.
- Henry Beard – 5 August 1833 – Hanged at Sydney for highway robbery at Maitland.
- William Johnstone – 6 August 1833 – Hanged at Sydney for highway robbery at Prospect Hill.
- Joseph Clifford – 6 August 1833 – Hanged at Sydney for highway robbery at Prospect Hill.
- Terence Byrne – 12 August 1833 – Hanged at Sydney for the murder of Ann Davis at Lane Cove.
- Edward Giles – 12 September 1833 – Hanged at Sydney for robbery at Sutton Forest.
- Jonathan Jones – 12 September 1833 – Hanged at Sydney for robbery of an elderly lady, Mary Larkin, of silver, handkerchiefs and jewellery on the Liverpool Road.
- John ("Flash Kiddy") Elliott – 12 September 1833 – Hanged at Sydney for robbery of a butcher named Mason in Liverpool St.
- George Giddons – 28 November 1833 – Hanged for attempted murder of Thomas Millbourne at Port Macquarie.
- Anthony Hitchcock ("Castle Forbes Gang") – 21 December 1833 – Hanged at Castle Forbes for shooting with intent to kill John Larnach at Patrick's Plains, Hunter Valley.
- John Poole ("Castle Forbes Gang") – 21 December 1833 – Hanged at Castle Forbes for shooting with intent to kill John Larnach at Patrick's Plains, Hunter Valley.
- James Riley ("Castle Forbes Gang") – 21 December 1833 – Hanged at Sydney for shooting with intent to kill John Larnach
- John Perry ("Castle Forbes Gang") – 21 December 1833 – Hanged at Sydney for shooting with intent to kill John Larnach
- James Ryan ("Castle Forbes Gang") – 21 December 1833 – Hanged at Sydney for shooting with intent to kill John Larnach.
- Michael Kearns – 21 December 1833 – Hanged at Sydney for highway robbery and assault on the person of James Podman at Bathurst.

=== 1834 ===
- Bryant Kyne – 13 January 1834 – Hanged at Sydney for the murder of James Gavarin (Gevan, Gavan, Gavanagh, Govarin) at the Balmain residence of the solicitor-general, John Plunkett.
- Patrick Gallagher – 23 January 1834 – Hanged at Sydney for the rape of Ellen Walsh in the vicinity of St Mary's Rd, Domain.
- William Elliott - 6 March 1834 - Hanged at Sydney for attempted murder of Corporal James McNally, a Mounted Policeman, on the Parramatta Road near Concord.
- Edward Gill (or Gills) - 6 March 1834 - Hanged at Sydney for "assaulting with intent to kill his master", Donald McIntyre, at Invermein, near Scone.
- William Johnson (alias 'Blue Stockings') - 6 March 1834 - Hanged at Sydney for the robbery of David Ramsay's dwelling-house at the Fish River in the Bathurst district.
- John Elliott - 14 March 1834 - Hanged at Sydney for the rape of Frances Cunningham at Sutton Forest
- Michael Carey – 19 May 1834 – Hanged at Sydney for sexual assault on ten-year-old Michael Minton (son of Michael Minton, murdered in the Richmond district in 1824) on the Parramatta Rd. Minton and his younger friend (who was witness to the crime) were ordered by the magistrate to attend the hanging.
- William Chapman - 18 August 1834 - Hanged at Sydney for the murder of Samuel Chapman (alias Priest) at Snails Bay in 1831
- Henry Mills - 18 August 1834 - Hanged at Sydney for the murder of Samuel Chapman (alias Priest) at Snails Bay in 1831
- Thomas Tattersdale – 10 November 1834 – Hanged at Sydney for the murder of Dr Robert Wardell in the Marrickville-Petersham area.
- John Jenkins – 19 November 1834 – Hanged at Sydney for the murder of Dr Robert Wardell.
- Michael Gallagher – 11 December 1834 – Hanged at Sydney for attempted murder of John Hinton in the Bargo Brush.
- John Edwards – 11 December 1834 – Hanged at Sydney for attempted murder of Corporal John Cock of the Mounted Police in the Lake Bathurst area.
- John Walton – 11 December 1834 – Hanged at Sydney for aiding and abetting the attempted murder of Corporal Cock.

=== 1835 ===
- Edward McManus – 9 February 1835 – Hanged at Sydney for the murder of sly-grog providore Alice Cooper (Bunton) at Emu Plains.
- William Weatherwick – 13 February 1835 – Hanged at Sydney for the murder of John Smith on the North Shore.
- William Phineas Bowles – 16 February 1835 – Hanged at Sydney for the murder of his wife Sarah in Bathurst St.
- Charles Norford – 20 February 1835 – Hanged at Sydney for the attempted murder of Patrick Lynch. Norford was shaving Lynch when he suddenly cut his throat.
- Mickey Mickey – 28 February 1835 – Indigenous. Hanged at Sydney for the rape of Margaret Hanswall at Watagan.
- John McCarthy – 4 May 1835 – Hanged at Sydney for the murder of Constable Duncan Kennedy near Carcoar.
- Patrick Kilmartin – 11 May 1835 – Hanged at Sydney for the murder of James Hamilton on the Botany Road.
- Henry Barlow – 26 May 1835 – Hanged at Sydney for the highway robbery of Captain Clarke and Edye Manning on the Liverpool Road at Punchbowl.
- John Carter – 26 May 1835 – Hanged at Sydney for the highway robbery of Captain Clarke and Edye Manning on the Liverpool Road at Punchbowl.
- John Bryant – 26 May 1835 – Hanged at Sydney for the highway robbery of Captain Clarke and Edye Manning on the Liverpool Road at Punchbowl.
- James Barton – 26 May 1835 – Hanged at Sydney for highway robbery on the Liverpool coach at Penrith.
- William Scannell (alias Daniel Hughes) – 26 May 1835 – Hanged at Sydney for the highway robbery of Captain Clarke and Edye Manning on the Liverpool Road at Punchbowl.
- John Molloy – 2 June 1835 – Hanged at Sydney for highway robbery and assault of Alexander Paine.
- John Stocking – 2 June 1835 – Hanged at Sydney for highway robbery and assault of Alexander Paine.
- Lawrence Whelahan – 2 June 1835 – Hanged at Sydney for assault on Mary Kelly at Canterbury.
- Joseph Keys – 2 June 1835 – Hanged at Sydney for the attempted murder of Charles Fisher Shepherd at Long Flats, Monaro.
- James Masterman – 5 June 1835 – Hanged at Sydney for highway robbery at Ultimo (Stonemason's Arms).
- William Salter (Sawder, Solder) – 5 June 1835 – Hanged at Sydney for highway robbery at Ultimo.
- James Thompson – 5 June 1835 – Hanged at Sydney for highway robbery at Ultimo.
- James Green – 5 June 1835 – Hanged at Sydney for shooting at Constable James Brown in the Braidwood district.
- John Gould (Joseph Gold) – 24 August 1835 – Hanged at Sydney for the murder of his wife at Bar Point. "One of the children of this unfortunate man was carried on the shoulders of a spectator, to witness the dying struggles of his parent."
- Charley – 4 September 1835 – Gringai man, actual name not recorded. Hanged at Dungog for his involvement in the murder of five white settlers at Rawdon Vale as part of the frontier conflict in the Barrington River district ("The Mackenzie Murders"). In Charley's case, he was named specifically for being responsible for the death of Fred Simmons.
- George Bagley – 15 September 1835 – Hanged at Newcastle for the attempted murder of Hugh McIntyre near Maitland.
- Patrick Cassidy – 15 September 1835 – Hanged at Newcastle for the attempted murder of Hugh McIntyre near Maitland.
- William O'Neill – 15 September 1835 – Hanged at Sydney for burglary and robbery.
- Thomas Solder – 15 September 1835 – Hanged at Sydney for burglary.
- Hugh Caffey – 15 September 1835 – Hanged at Sydney for burglary.
- Peter Doyle – 15 September 1835 – Hanged at Sydney for the assault and robbery of William Akers outside Bathurst.
- Martin Byrne – 15 September 1835 – Hanged at Sydney for the assault and robbery of William Akers outside Bathurst.
- William Jeffries – 9 November 1835 – Hanged at Sydney for the murder of Richard Somerville at Port Macquarie.
- Richard Bayliss – 8 December 1835 – Hanged for burglary at sundry houses at Field of Mars and elsewhere.
- John Williams – 8 December 1835 – Hanged for burglary at sundry houses at Field of Mars and elsewhere.
- Thomas Connolly – 8 December 1835 – Hanged for burglary at sundry houses at Field of Mars and elsewhere.
- John Maher – 8 December 1835 – Hanged at Sydney for the attempted murder of Peter Robinson at Maitland.

=== 1836 ===
- Thomas Arundell – 8 February 1836 – Hanged at Sydney for the murder of Margaret Fitzpatrick at Lewis Ponds, near Bathurst.
- Edward Jones – 8 February 1836 – Hanged at Sydney for the murder of Margaret Fitzpatrick at Lewis Ponds, near Bathurst.
- William Doyle – 8 February 1836 – Hanged at Sydney for the murder of John Molloy near Mount York.
- William Baker – 8 February 1836 – Hanged at Sydney for the murder of his wife Mary at Penrith.
- Robert Duffy – 15 February 1836 – Hanged at Sydney for the stabbing murder of his wife Mary Duffy in Phillip St.
- John Whitehead – 4 March 1836 – Hanged at Sydney for highway robbery at Lane Cove.
- John Hare – 4 March 1836 – Hanged at Sydney for the attempted murder of Major William Elrington at Bathurst.
- John Treish (Frisk, Fish, Trish, Frish) – 4 March 1836 – Hanged at Sydney for highway robbery at Lane Cove.
- John Smith – 4 March 1836 – Hanged at Sydney for burglary in the Hunter Valley.
- William Kitchen – 9 May 1836 – Hanged at Sydney for the murder of his wife Ann in Harrington St.
- John Wales (also called Watt) - 10 May 1836 – Hanged at Sydney for the assault and putting in bodily fear of Constable Daniel Riley near Bong Bong.
- Timothy Pickering – 10 May 1836 – Hanged at Sydney for the assault and putting in bodily fear of Daniel Riley near Bong Bong.
- Joseph Free – 11 May 1836 – Hanged at Sydney for the murder of Edward Brown at Invermein.
- James Tobin – 16 May 1836 – Hanged at Sydney for the murder of Patrick Fox at Marks' Farm, Illawarra.
- Michael Maloney – 17 June 1836 – Hanged at Sydney for burglary from the house of Richard Hamlyn at Goulburn.
- James Hare – 17 June 1836 – Hanged at Sydney for burglary from the house of Richard Hamlyn at Goulburn.
- Terence Lavell – 21 June 1836 – Hanged at Sydney for burglary from the house of Honora Davey at Williams River.
- James Sproule (alias Fraser) – 21 June 1836 – Hanged at Sydney for burglary from the house of Honora Davey at Williams River.
- John Gore – 10 August 1836 – Hanged at Sydney for aiding and abetting the murder of Thomas Wood at Cassilis.
- William Walker – 10 August 1836 – Hanged at Sydney for the murder of Thomas Wood at Cassilis.
- John Gregg – 2 September 1836 – Hanged at Sydney for highway robbery in the Penrith district.
- James Smith – 14 November 1836 – Hanged at Sydney for the murder of Jack Haydon between Marulan & Bungonia. Smith was the first non-Indigenous Australian-born person to be executed.
- Thomas (or James) Walker - 18 November 1836 - Hanged for murder of fellow bushranger John Poole in the Hunter Valley.
- John Mead – 29 November 1836 – Hanged at Sydney for the rape and sodomy of Julius Rudder, aged ten, on the Old Botany Road.
- William (or James or Thomas) Cook – 29 November 1836 – Hanged at Sydney for the rape of Alice Kent in the Upper Hunter Valley.

=== 1837 to 1838 ===
- Andrew Gillies – 15 February 1837 – Hanged at Sydney for the murder of James Kelly near Yass.
- George Capsey – 7 March 1837 – Hanged at Sydney for the robbery and assault of Henry Jarvis near Berrima.
- John Jones – 8 May 1837 – Hanged at Sydney for the murder of Private Thomas O'Brien, a soldier of the 50th Regiment, on the highway outside Berrima.
- John Cooper – 9 June 1837 – Hanged at Sydney for attempted murder on Dominic Gannon at Port Macquarie.
- William Taylor – 9 June 1837 – Hanged at Sydney for aggravated highway robbery of Mr Thomas Hyacinth Macquoid on the road between Berrima and Mittagong.
- Michael Cagney (or Cogner) – 1 September 1837 – Hanged at Sydney for the murder of Edward Hughes at Maitland.
- Louis Williams – 1 September 1837 – Hanged at Sydney for the murder of John McCormick at the Gwydir River.
- Philip Hennessy – 5 September 1837 – Hanged at Sydney for highway robbery of Alexander Hamilton in the Hunter Valley.
- Dennis Broslughan (sometimes Brossley) – 5 September 1837 – Hanged at Sydney for highway robbery of Alexander Hamilton in the Hunter Valley.
- John Cary Willis – 8 December 1837 – Hanged at Sydney for the murder of Dennis Maloney at Port Macquarie.
- Edward Doyle – 8 December 1837 – Hanged at Sydney for robbery and putting in fear at the house of James Wright, Bay of Islands, New Zealand.
- George Woolf – 8 December 1837 – Hanged at Sydney for shooting and wounding with intent to kill Patrick Sheedy, a police corporal who was attempting to arrest him at Bathurst.
- William Moore – 22 February 1838 – Publicly hanged in High St, Maitland for the murder of his master John Hoskyns.
- Patrick Cuffy – 20 March 1838 – Hanged at Sydney for robbery and assault on William Vivers at Bureen.
- John Toole – 20 March 1838 – Hanged at Sydney for robbery and assault on William Vivers at Bureen.
- Edward Tufts – 29 April 1838 – Hanged at Sydney for the murder of John Jones at Taree.
- George Comerford – 30 May 1838 – Bushranger. Hanged at Sydney for the murder of Constable Matthew Thompkins at Deep Creek, near Eganstown in the Port Phillip District. Comerford had murdered (or been involved in the murder of) at least seven men.
- Bryant Flannigan – 15 June 1838 – Hanged at Sydney for the murder of John Nagle, "Big Mary" Nagle and Patrick Riley at Bunbejong, near Mudgee.
- Daniel Maloney – 15 June 1838 – Hanged at Sydney for the murder of Thomas Mahoney at Hassan's Walls.
- Dennis Haberlin (Haverden) – 15 June 1838 – Hanged at Sydney for robbery at the house of John and Sarah Rawles and the attempted rape of Sarah Rawles, at Woodford Bay, Longueville.
- Thomas Ribbands – 15 June 1838 – Hanged at Sydney for putting in fear and burglary from the house of Ann Jones, at Taree. Ann's husband John had been stabbed to death by one of their servants, Edward Tufts, earlier that year.
- William Wilkins – 4 September 1838 – Hanged at Sydney for assault and robbery of Thomas Humphries near Maitland.
- William Worthington ("Bumblefoot") – 4 September 1838 – Hanged at Sydney for the axe murder of Jack Swan at Port Macquarie.
- William Hawkins – 18 December 1838 – Hanged at Sydney Gaol for his part in the Myall Creek Massacre.
- John Johnson – 18 December 1838 – Hanged at Sydney Gaol for his part in the Myall Creek Massacre.
- Edward Foley – 18 December 1838 – Hanged at Sydney Gaol for his part in the Myall Creek Massacre.
- Jim Oates – 18 December 1838 – Hanged at Sydney Gaol for his part in the Myall Creek Massacre.
- James Parry – 18 December 1838 – Hanged at Sydney Gaol for his part in the Myall Creek Massacre.
- Charlie Kilmeister – 18 December 1838 – Hanged at Sydney Gaol for his part in the Myall Creek Massacre.
- John Russell – 18 December 1838 – Hanged at Sydney Gaol for his part in the Myall Creek Massacre.
- William Price – 21 December 1838 – Hanged at Sydney for the murder of John "My Lord" Dunn in Sorrell Street Parramatta. The victim was well known in the district at the time; he was seventy years old, a convict who had been in the colony thirty years, "very deformed" and less than a metre tall.

=== 1839 ===
- Timothy O'Donnell – 7 June 1839 – Hanged at Sydney for the murder of Alexander McEdwards at Mt Campbell.
- Michael Walsh – 7 June 1839 – Hanged at Sydney for the murder of Alexander McEdwards at Mt Campbell.
- Edward Hall – 7 June 1839 – Hanged at Sydney for the murder of Patrick Fitzpatrick at Currawang.
- James Mayne – 7 June 1839 – Hanged at Sydney for the murder of Patrick Fitzpatrick at Currawang
- James Magee – 7 June 1839 – Hanged at Sydney for the murder of his wife Catherine at Cowpastures (Camden)
- Thomas Sumner – 23 June 1839 – Hanged at Sydney for robbery with violence at the house of William Woods and rape of Ann Amlin at King's Plains (Blayney)
- George Cooke – 23 June 1839 – Hanged at Sydney for robbery with violence at the house of William Woods and rape of Ann Amlin at King's Plains (Blayney)
- Ryder Gorman – 23 June 1839 – Hanged at Sydney for robbery with violence at the house of William Woods and rape of Ann Amlin at King's Plains (Blayney)
- Dennis Dacey – 23 June 1839 – Hanged at Sydney for robbery with violence at the house of William Woods and rape of Ann Amlin at King's Plains (Blayney)
- Thomas Finney – 20 August 1839 – Hanged at Sydney for the murder of his wife Elizabeth at Cockfighter's Creek (Wollombi)
- Patrick Quilken – 6 September 1839 – Hanged at Sydney for the murder of William MacLaren at Barrington Tops
- William Morris – 26 November 1839 – Hanged at Sydney for murder of Thomas Renton at the Bargon River
- Peter Scullion (Scallyen) – 26 November 1839 – Hanged at Sydney for the robbery and murder of Andrew Shanley at Sutton Forest
- Joseph Saunders – 26 November 1839 – Hanged at Sydney for aiding and abetting the murder of Andrew Shanley
- George Carey – 26 November 1839 – Hanged at Sydney for having stolen property in possession and abetting the murder of Shanley
- George (John) Gorman – 26 November 1839 – Hanged at Sydney for the murder of Ann Daly at Maitland
- James Davies – 29 November 1839 – Hanged at Sydney for the murder of James Maher at Black Creek (Branxton)
- Alexander Telford – 29 November 1839 – Hanged at Sydney for aiding and abetting the murder of James Maher
- Archibald Taylor – 29 November 1839 – Hanged at Sydney for aiding and abetting the murder of James Maher
- Llewellyn Powell – 29 November 1839 – Hanged at Sydney for the murder of Abraham Meares near Gilgandra
- James Lynch – 29 November 1839 – Hanged at Sydney for aiding & abetting the Meares murder
- Charles Clipp – 29 November 1839 – Hanged at Sydney for aiding & abetting the Meares murder.

== 1840s ==
- John (or James) Hunt ("The Doctor") – 10 March 1840 – Hanged at Sydney for murder of Dan McCarthy at Regentville
- Thomas Whitton – 19 March 1840 – Publicly hanged at Goulburn for the murder of John Hawker and arson at Oak Park, Crookwell. Whitton had earlier murdered John Kennedy Hume, brother of the explorer Hamilton Hume
- William Newman – 8 December 1840 – Hanged at Sydney for the murder of Harry Hodgson at Rosemount station, Patrick's Plains (Singleton).
- James Martin – 8 December 1840 – Bushranger. Hanged at Sydney for the murder of Jack Johnston at Gammon Plains
- James Mason – 8 December 1840 – Bushranger. Hanged at Sydney for being an accessory to the murder of Jack Johnston
- Michael Monaghan (sometimes recorded as Hinnigan, Minighan) – 11 December 1840 – Hanged at Sydney for the murder of his overseer Robert Archer at Glendon
- Enoch Bradley – 11 December 1840 – Hanged at Sydney for the murder of George Woodman at Yass
- John Francis Legge – 11 December 1840 – Hanged at Sydney for the rape of Sarah Brooks, his wife's four-year-old child
- Edward Davis (or Davies) ("Teddy the Jew Boy") – 16 March 1841 – Hanged at Sydney for his role in the murder of John Graham. The "Jew Boy" Gang terrorised the Hunter River district with numerous robberies.
- John Shea ("Jew Boy Gang") – 16 March 1841 – Hanged at Sydney for the murder of John Graham at Scone.
- Robert Chitty ("Jew Boy Gang") – 16 March 1841 – Hanged at Sydney for his role in the murder of John Graham.
- James ('Ruggy') Everett ("Jew Boy Gang") – 16 March 1841 – Hanged at Sydney for his role in the murder of John Graham.
- John Marshall ("Jew Boy Gang") – 16 March 1841 – Hanged at Sydney for his role in the murder of John Graham.
- Richard Glanville ("Jew Boy Gang") – 16 March 1841 – Hanged at Sydney for his role in the murder of John Graham.
- Michael Bradley – 5 April 1841 – Hanged at Newcastle for the murder of Catherine Harrison near Morpeth
- Charles Cannon – 25 May 1841 – Hanged at Bathurst for the murder of Robert Bulmer at Cherry Tree Hill, near Carcoar
- Michael Lynch – 4 June 1841 – Hanged for murder of Matthew Sullivan near Jamberoo. Lynch is assumed to be the last person hanged on the gallows at the Old Sydney Gaol, George Street
- Patrick Curran – 21 October 1841 – Bushranger. Hanged at Berrima for attempted murder of constable Patrick McGuire at the Black Range, Molonglo, and rape of Mary Wilsmore at Bungendore
- Robert Hudson – 29 October 1841 – Publicly hanged outside Darlinghurst Gaol for murdering fellow convict Dean West at the hospital, Macquarie St
- George Stroud (Stroode) – 29 October 1841 – Publicly hanged outside Darlinghurst Gaol for murdering his wife Sarah at Concord. Stroud and Hudson were the first men executed at Darlinghurst Gaol
- Thomas Horner – 5 April 1842 – Hanged at Newcastle for the murder of his overseer James Stone near Shannon Vale. Stone was the former wrestler known as "Little Elephant"
- Patrick Kleighran (Clearehan, Clerehan, Clearham) – 22 April 1842 – Hanged at Berrima for the murder of Timothy Murphy on the Murrumbidgee.
- John Lynch (alias Dunleavy) – 22 April 1842 – Hanged at Berrima for the murder of Kearns Landregan near the Ironstone Bridge on the edge of Berrima. Confessed to ten murders.
- John Walsh – 3 May 1842 – Hanged at Bathurst for the murder of Catherine Collitt at Mt Victoria.
- Henry Sears – 8 November 1842 – Hanged at Darlinghurst for piracy and assault with intent to murder, off Norfolk Island.
- John Jones – 8 November 1842 – Hanged at Darlinghurst for piracy and assault with intent to murder, off Norfolk Island.
- Nicholas Lewis (alias Head) – 8 November 1842 – Hanged at Darlinghurst for piracy and assault with intent to murder, off Norfolk Island.
- George Beavor – 8 November 1842 – Hanged at Darlinghurst for piracy and assault with intent to murder, off Norfolk Island.
- Stephen Brennan – 9 November 1842 – Hanged at Darlinghurst Gaol for the murder of Pat Lynch on Norfolk Island.
- George Wilson – 24 April 1843 – Hanged at Newcastle for the malicious wounding of Francis Bigge at the Peel River.
- Thomas Forrester ("Long Tom") – 24 April 1843 – Hanged at Newcastle for aiding and abetting the malicious wounding of Francis Bigge at the Peel River.
- Matthew Whittle – 2 May 1843 – Bushranger. Hanged at Bathurst for the attempted murder of Patrick Grady near Oberon.
- Lucretia Dunkley – 16 October 1843 – Hanged at Berrima Gaol for the murder of her husband, Henry Dunkley, near Gunning.
- Martin Beech – 16 October 1843 – Hanged at Berrima Gaol for the murder of Henry Dunkley near Gunning.
- Benjamin Harris – 17 October 1843 – Hanged at Newcastle for the murder of Constable John Rutledge near Denman.
- Therramitchie – 24 October 1843 – Indigenous. Confessed to at least two murders. Publicly hanged at Port Macquarie for the murder of John Pocock.
- Harry – 8 November 1843 – Indigenous. Hanged at Maitland Gaol for the murder of a baby named Michael Keoghue near Glendon.
- Melville – 8 November 1843 – Indigenous. Hanged at Maitland for the murder of a baby named Michael Keoghue near Glendon.
- John Knatchbull – 13 February 1844 – Former Royal Navy captain, publicly hanged in front of Darlinghurst Gaol for the murder of shopkeeper Ellen Jamieson with a tomahawk in Margaret Street.
- Mary Thornton – 17 April 1844 – Hanged at Newcastle for the murder of her husband John Thornton near Mulbring.
- Joseph Vale – 17 April 1844 – Hanged at Newcastle for the murder of John Thornton near Mulbring.
- Frederick (or Abraham) Gasten (or Gaston) – 31 October 1844 – Hanged at Bathurst for the murder of Elizabeth Price near Kanimbla.
- George Vigors – 13 August 1844 – Hanged at Darlinghurst for the murder of James Noble in Clarence St.
- Thomas Burdett – 13 August 1844 – Hanged at Darlinghurst for the murder of James Noble in Clarence St.
- Henry Atkins – 8 October 1844 – Hanged at Berrima for the murder of John Daly near Tumut.
- Benjamin Stanley – 7 November 1844 – Hanged at Newcastle for the murder of Robert Campbell at Williams River.
- John Vidall – 7 February 1845 – Hanged at Darlinghurst for the murder of Thomas Warne in George St.
- John Ahern – 12 August 1845 – Publicly hanged at Darlinghurst for the murder of his niece Mary-Anne Clark in the area that subsequently became Railway Square.
- James Fitzpatrick – 24 October 1845 – Hanged at Newcastle for the murder of Peter McCormick, a fellow-convict at the Newcastle Stockade.
- William Shea – 17 April 1846 – Hanged at Newcastle for the murder of Andrew Menzies at Hillsborough.
- John Kean (Liddell) – 30 April 1847 – Hanged at Darlinghurst for the murder of Ellen Hyndes near Campbelltown.
- Peter Pigeon – 4 November 1847 – Hanged at Newcastle for the murder of William "Coachey" Taylor at Morpeth.
- William Fyfe (Foyle in Prison Records) – 4 July 1848 – Publicly hanged at Darlinghurst for murder of Robert Cox at Kangaroo Point, Moreton Bay.
- Francis Dermott (or Diamond or Durham) – 22 September 1848 – African-American. Hanged at Darlinghurst for the rape of Mary Green on the Shoalhaven.
- Patrick Bryan – 1 November 1848 – Hanged at Newcastle for the murder of Eliza Neilson at Clarence Town.
- Charles Henry Mackie – 10 November 1848 – Hanged at Bathurst for the rape of a nine-year-old girl.
- George Waters Ward – 19 March 1849 – Hanged at Maitland for the murder of Richard Connolly (or King) at Muswellbrook.
- James Richardson – 7 May 1849 – Hanged at Darlinghurst for the murder of his wife Elizabeth Richardson at Campbelltown. He had also murdered Elizabeth's daughter and nine-month-old grandchild and attempted to murder a four-year-old grandchild.
- Owen Molloy – 18 September 1849 – Publicly hanged at Darlinghurst for the murder of John Leonard at Moreton Bay.
- Patrick Walsh – 26 October 1849 – Publicly hanged in front of Bathurst Gaol for the murder of Benjamin Fox on the Turon River.

== 1850s ==
- Mogo Gar – 5 November 1850 – Bundjalung man, hanged at Darlinghurst for the murder of Daniel Page at the Bellinger River.
- James Whelan – 5 November 1850 – Hanged at Darlinghurst for the murder of Catherine Byrnes near Kent St.
- William Hayes – 26 April 1851 – Hanged at Maitland Gaol for the murder of Benjamin Cott near present-day Gillieston.
- Michael Collihane (alias "Mickey Bad-English") - 8 October 1851 – Publicly hanged at Maitland for the rape of Anne Milsom at Aberdeen.
- Patrick McNamara – 29 March 1852 – Hanged at Maitland for the murder of his wife Rose McNamara at Aberglasslyn.
- Thomas Wilmore – 14 April 1852 – Hanged at Goulburn Gaol for the murder of Phillip Alger in the Wellington District.
- Francis Thomas Green – 21 September 1852 – Publicly hanged outside Darlinghurst Gaol for the murder of John Jones at Buckley's Creek. This was the last public hanging in NSW.
- Timothy Sullivan – 30 September 1852 – Hanged at Bathurst for the murder of Daniel Harrington at King's Plains, near Carcoar. This execution was badly botched.
- John Newing – 30 September 1852 – Hanged at Bathurst for the murder of Hing, another Chinese man, on 17 October 1851, at Brown's Station on the Castlereagh
- Paddy – 8 April 1853 – Wiradjuri man, hanged at Bathurst for the rape of Catherine Schmidt at Oakey Creek in the Mudgee district.
- Patrick McCarthy – 8 April 1853 – Hanged at Bathurst for the murder of Henry Williamson at Bookimbla.
- Billy Palmer – 9 May 1854 – Hanged at Bathurst for the murder of Jane Bradley near Obley.
- James McLaughlan – 9 May 1854 – Hanged at Bathurst for the murder of Sarah Atkins at Kikiamah, near Grenfell.
- James Talbot – 30 May 1854 – Hanged at Goulburn for the murder of James Barry at Kangaloola Creek, near Yass.
- Daniel Gardiner – 4 April 1854 – Hanged at Maitland for the murder of his wife Catherine at Rocky River.
- Christopher Walsh – 28 September 1854 – Hanged at Maitland for the murder of his wife Mary Walsh at Lidney Park, near Millers Forest.
- William Ryan – 28 February 1855 – Hanged at Darlinghurst for the murder of his wife Catherine near the corner of Hay and Castlereagh Sts.
- William Rodgers – 5 July 1855 – Hanged at Darlinghurst for the murder of Joseph Allsopp at Baulkham Hills.
- Samuel Wilcox – 5 July 1855 – Hanged at Darlinghurst for the murder of Johanna Smith in Liverpool St, Sydney.
- Mary-Ann Brownlow − 11 November 1855 – Hanged at Goulburn Gaol for the murder of her husband George Moore Brownlow at Gundaroo.
- Henry Curran – 12 May 1857 – Hanged at Bathurst for the rape and violent assault of Bridget Watkins at Dirty Swamp (Locksley).
- Addison Mitchell – 12 May 1857 – Hanged at Bathurst for the murder of William Ablett between Carcoar and Cowra.
- Patrick Walsh – 4 November 1857 – Hanged at Goulburn for the murder of William Graham at Balranald.
- James Moyes – 7 September 1858 – Hanged at Darlinghurst for the murder of William Alden on board the Oliver Jordan, berthed at Sydney.
- John Arrow – 11 May 1859 – Hanged at Bathurst for the murder of Catherine Leary at Summer Hill Creek, Orange.
- Thomas Ryan (alias William Martin) – 11 May 1859 – Hanged at Bathurst for the rape of Leah England in the Wellington Valley.
- Harry – 18 May 1859 – Indigenous. Hanged at Goulburn for the rape and attempted murder of fifteen-year-old Margaret McMahon at Coolamatong near Berridale.
- John Norris – 22 July 1859 – Hanged at Darlinghurst for the rape of six-year-old Harriet Curren near Prospect.
- Robert Davis – 3 November 1859 – Hanged at Bathurst for the murder of Roger Flood (or Robert Quinn) at Dubbo.
- William Ross – 22 November 1859 – Hanged at Maitland for the murder of Jack Hamilton at Walcha.
- Jemmy – 22 November 1859 – Hanged at Maitland for the murder of Sam Pong at Gunnedah.

== 1860s ==
- John Jones – 26 April 1860 – Hanged at Maitland for the murder of Rebecca Bailey outside Maitland.
- Jim Crow – 26 April 1860 – Indigenous. Hanged at Maitland for the rape of Jane Delantry at Thalaba, outside Dungog.
- Ellen Monks – 8 May 1860 – Hanged at Goulburn for the hammer murder of her husband Thomas Monks at Longnose Creek, near Crookwell.
- Frederick Clarke – 8 May 1860 – Hanged at Goulburn for the murder of Walter Angel in the Moppity Range, near Murringo.
- William Goodson – 16 May 1860 – Hanged at Darlinghurst for the murder of his wife Mary Goodson at Kissing Point.
- Black Harry (also called Sippey Shippy, Sippy, Sheepy, Lippy) – 6 November 1861 – Indigenous. Hanged at Maitland for the murder of Mary Mills at Hall's Creek, near Merriwa.
- William Johnson (Baldwin) – 3 December 1861 – Hanged at Goulburn for the rape of Alice Hutchings at Rossiville, outside Goulburn.
- Jackey Bullfrog (alias 'Flash Jack') – 25 April 1862 – Indigenous. Hanged at Bathurst for the murder of William Clark near Condobolin.
- John Peisley – 25 April 1862 – Bushranger. Hanged at Bathurst for the murder (fatal wounding) of William Benyon at Bigga. An associate of the Ben Hall - Frank Gardiner Gang.
- Henry Keene – 5 May 1862 – Bushranger. Hanged at Goulburn for the murder of James Lawrie on Billabong Creek.
- Benjamin Allerton – 5 May 1862 – Bushranger. Hanged at Goulburn for the robbery and wounding with intent of David Elliott at Wakool.
- John Smith (alias Regan) – 4 June 1862 – Hanged at Goulburn for attempted murder on Alfred Bishop at Tipperary Gully, near Young.
- Jackey – 23 October 1862 – Indigenous. Hanged at Bathurst for the rape of Louisa Brown at Winburndale.
- Alexander Ross – 18 March 1863 – Bushranger. Hanged at Darlinghurst for highway robbery and the attempted murder of Harry Stephens at Caloola, near Blayney.
- Charles Ross – 18 March 1863 – Bushranger. Hanged at Darlinghurst for highway robbery and the attempted murder of Harry Stephens at Caloola, near Blayney.
- Henry Manns – 26 March 1863 – Bushranger. Hanged at Darlinghurst for his part in the highway robbery of the gold escort at Eugowra Rocks. An associate of the Ben Hall - Frank Gardiner Gang.
- Charles Robardy – 20 May 1863 – Hanged at Goulburn for the murder of Daniel Crotty on the Boorowa-Murringo Road, near Willawong Creek.
- Mahommed Cassim – 2 June 1863 – Circus Juggler, born in India. Hanged at Goulburn for the murder of a fellow juggler (name lost) at Sawpit Gully, near Queanbeyan.
- Henry Wilson – 2 October 1863 – Bushranger. Hanged at Maitland for the murder of Peter Clarke near Murrurundi.
- Thomas McCann – 1 February 1864 – Hanged at Darlinghurst for highway robbery and the attempted murder of William Saville near Cordeaux Creek, Berrima.
- James Stewart – 22 November 1864 – Hanged at Bathurst for the murder of Charles Verdhun near Bourke.
- George Gibson (alias Paddy Tom) – 20 May 1865 – Bushranger. Hanged at Bathurst for the murder of Alec Musson at Pyramul.
- Sam Poo – 19 September 1865 – Bushranger. Hanged at Bathurst for the murder of Snr Constable John Ward at Barney's Reef near Birriwa.
- Ah Luan – 21 November 1865 – Hanged at Bathurst for the murder of Nee Jack at Bald Hills Creek.
- John Dunn – 19 March 1866 – Bushranger, member of the Ben Hall Gang. Hanged at Darlinghurst for robbery and the murder of Constable Sam Nelson at Collector
- James Crookwell – 14 April 1866 – Bushranger. Hanged at Darlinghurst for the murder of Constable William Raymond in the Bargo Brush.
- Michael Green – 11 June 1866 – Hanged at Darlinghurst for the murder of Andrew Shearer at Rushcutter's Bay.
- Spider – 26 November 1866 – Indigenous. Hanged at Bathurst for the rape of Elizabeth Anderson at Canonbar, near Nyngan.
- Michael Maher – 3 December 1866 – Hanged at Bathurst for the murder of Richard Higgins at Garrawilla, near Coonabarabran.
- Harry Suis – 10 December 1866 – Hanged at Goulburn for the murder of Ah Wong at Goulburn.
- William Henry Scott – 18 March 1867 – Hanged at Darlinghurst for the murder of Anne Ramsden (Scott) in Sussex St.
- Thomas Clarke – 25 June 1867 – Bushranger. Hanged at Darlinghurst for the attempted murder of Constable William Walsh at Jinden.
- John Clarke – 25 June 1867 – Bushranger. Hanged at Darlinghurst for the attempted murder of Constable William Walsh at Jinden.
- William Peters – 19 June 1867 – Hanged in Bathurst Gaol for the attempted murder of eight-year-old Faith Perkins at Orange.
- Henry James O'Farrell – 21 April 1868 – Hanged at Darlinghurst Gaol for the attempted assassination of Prince Alfred Duke of Edinburgh on 12 March 1868 at Clontarf.
- Albert Barnes – 26 May 1868 – Hanged in the old gaol at Bathurst for the murder of James Casey at Hassan's Walls.
- John McEvitt – 26 May 1868 – Hanged in the old gaol at Bathurst for the murder of a boy named Francis Evans at Clark's Creek.
- John Munday (alias Collins)- 2 June 1868 – Hanged at Goulburn for the murder of John Conroy, Bridget Conroy, Thomas Smith, a shepherd surnamed White and another shepherd, name not recorded, near Bowning.
- Ah Sung – 24 November 1868 – Hanged at Bathurst for the murder of Ralph Lee and Amelia Lee (aged five), near Avisford.

== 1870s ==
- John Baker - 1871 - Bushranger hanged at Bathurst for murder and other crimes. A partner of Wiliam Bertam, who was hanged at Toowoomba on 29 August 1870. They stuck up Mount Murchison Station, Cobham's station and a Poolamacca resident and stole horses, etc. Also committed other robberies on the road and entered homes; in Oct 1869 on the Barrier Ranges they bailed up a hawker, Charles Young, whom they murdered.
- Robert Campbell (alias Palmer) – 10 January 1871 – Hanged at Wagga Wagga for the murder of John and Louis Pohlman at Yanco.
- Chong Gow – 6 June 1871 – Hanged at Deniliquin for the murder of Tommy Ah Gun at Hay.
- Michael McMahon – 12 December 1871 – Hanged at Maitland for the murder of Jack Jones at Hall's Creek.

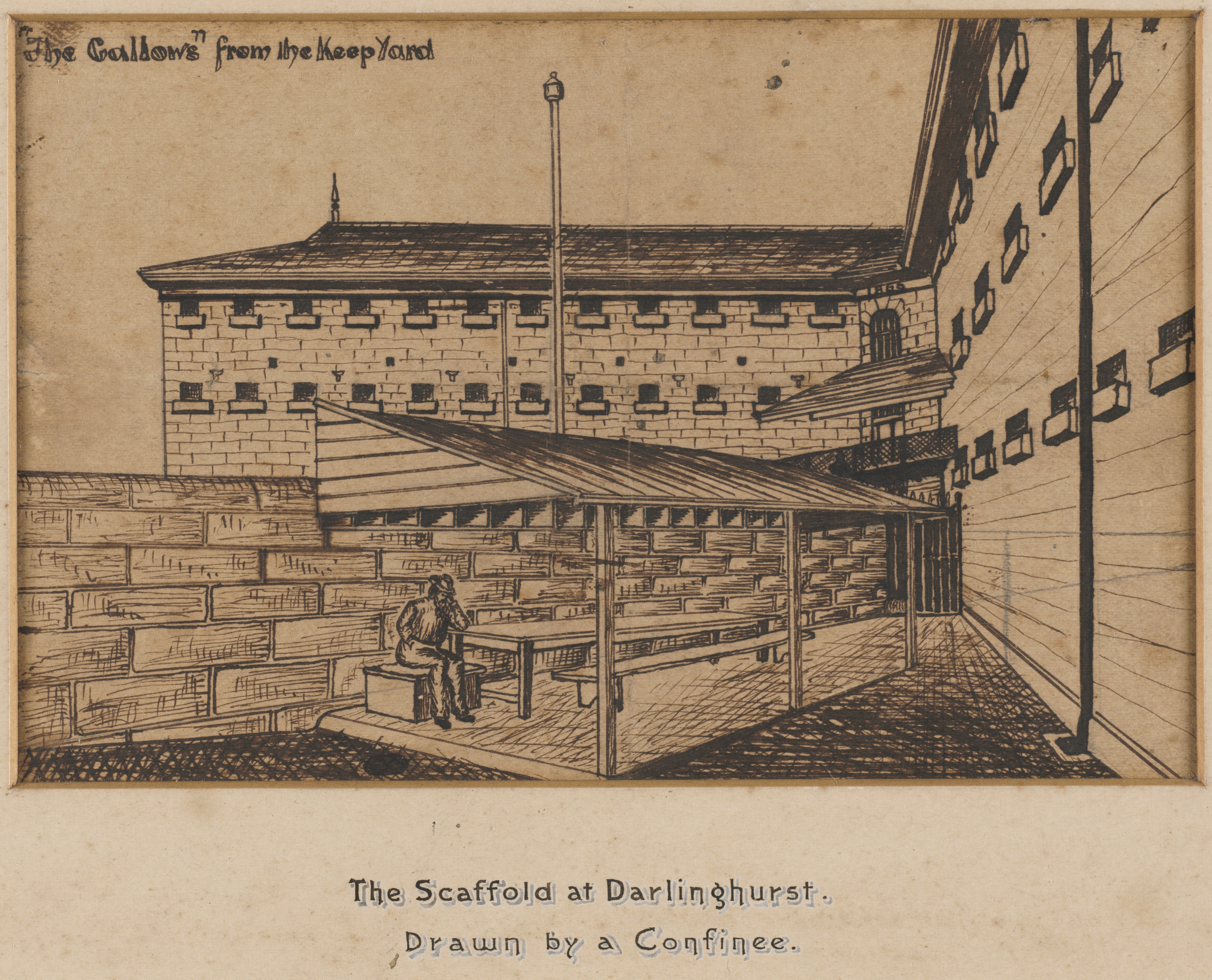
A view of the permanent gallows at Darlinghurst Gaol (drawn by an inmate from the yard below).

- Thomas Kelly – 2 January 1872 – Hanged at Darlinghurst for the attempted murder of William McLaren, superintendent of stone-masons, at Parramatta Gaol. Kelly's execution was first to be carried out upon the new "improved" gallows at Darlinghurst Gaol, erected in 1869.
- George Robert Nichols (The Parramatta River Murders) – 18 June 1872 – Hanged at Darlinghurst for the murder of William Percy Walker (and John Bridger) in upper Sydney Harbour.
- Alfred Lester (alias Froude) (The Parramatta River Murders) – 18 June 1872 – Hanged at Darlinghurst for the murder of William Percy Walker (and John Bridger) in upper Sydney Harbour.
- John Conn – 11 June 1872 – Hanged at Bathurst for the murder of Aveline Littler near Wyndeyer.
- William McCrow – 8 April 1873 – Hanged at Darlinghurst Gaol for the murder of Margaret Ward at a residence on the corner of Crown and Stanley streets, Woolloomooloo.
- John Scource – 8 April 1873 – Hanged at Darlinghurst Gaol for the murder of Elizabeth Lee on Sydney Harbour.
- Julius Krauss (also called William Cross) – 1 July 1873 – Hanged at Darlinghurst Gaol for the murder of Captain John Longmuir on board HMS Rifleman.
- Henry Vincent Jarvis – 23 December 1873 – Hanged at Darlinghurst Gaol for the murder of James Muggeridge on the Orange-Bathurst Road near Evans Plains Creek.
- John Hawthorne (alias Perry, real name Sherrin) – 19 May 1874 – Bushranger. Believed to have committed at least four murders. Hanged at Goulburn for the robbery & attempted murder of James Slocombe near Wheeo.
- John Glover – 19 May 1874 – Hanged at Goulburn for the murder of William Piety at Bolaro, near Adaminaby.
- Gottlieb Eichhorn – 23 June 1874 – Hanged at Armidale Gaol for the rape of seventy-two-year-old Eliza Chapman at Saumarez Ponds. Mrs Chapman died from the injuries received. Eichhorn was sixteen at the time of the crime.
- John McGrath – 10 September 1875 – Indigenous. Hanged at Darlinghurst Gaol for rape of Sarah Murfin at Warragubra, near Bega.
- George Rope – 7 December 1875 – Hanged at Mudgee Gaol for the murder of his sister-in-law Hannah Rope at Lawson's Creek.
- Ah Chong – 18 April 1876 – Hanged at Darlinghurst Gaol for the murder of Po Tie at Parramatta Gaol.
- George Pitt – 21 June 1876 – Hanged at Mudgee for the murder of Ann Martin at Guntawang.
- Michael Connelly – 28 June 1876 – Hanged at Tamworth Gaol for the murder of his wife Mary Connelly at Carroll Gap.
- Daniel Boon – 19 July 1876 – Hanged at Wagga Wagga for the murder of Alexander McMullan at North Wagga.
- Thomas Newman – 29 May 1877 – Hanged at Old Dubbo Gaol for the murder of a child, Mary-Ann McGregor, near Coonabarabran.
- Peter Murdick (alias Higgins) – 18 December 1877 – Hanged at Wagga Wagga for the murder of Henry Ford near Cartwright's Hill.
- Ing Chee – 28 May 1878 – Hanged at Goulburn Gaol for the murder of Li Hock in Goulburn.
- Alfred – 10 June 1879 – Indigenous. Hanged at Mudgee for the rape of Jane Dowd at Three Mile Flat, Maryvale, near Wellington.

== 1880s ==
- Andrew George Scott ('Captain Moonlite') – 20 January 1880 – (bushranger) Hanged at Darlinghurst Gaol for the murder of Senior-constable Edward Webb Bowen, after a confrontation with police at McGlede's farm near 'Wantabadgery' station.
- Thomas Rogan – 20 January 1880 – (bushranger) A member of Moonlite's Gang, hanged at Darlinghurst Gaol for the murder of Senior-constable Bowen.
- Albert – 26 May 1880 – Indigenous police-tracker, hanged at Dubbo Gaol for the shooting murder of an Aboriginal man named 'Nugle Jack' (and the wounding of 'Sally') at their camp-site near Baradine.
- Dan King (a Chinese man) – 11 June 1880 – Hanged at Tamworth Gaol for the murder of Lizzie Hart (alias Rolk, alias Betts) at Tamworth.
- William Brown – 29 March 1881 – Hanged at Darlinghurst Gaol for the rape of his twelve-year-old daughter Ann at Yappa Brush, The Bight, across the Manning River from Wingham township.
- Henry Wilkinson – 1 June 1881 – Hanged at Albury Gaol for the murder of Mary Pumpa at Lyster's Gap, near Jindera.
- John McGuan – 22 November 1882 – Hanged at Armidale for the murder of a bootmaker named Thomas Smith near Inverell.
- Charles Cunningham – 29 November 1882 – Hanged at Goulburn Gaol for the attempted murder of the prison warder John Izard at Berrima Gaol. Although he was a young man, Cunningham had spent most of his adult life in prison and exhibited an intense hatred of authority.
- Henry Tester – 7 December 1882 – Hanged at Deniliquin for the murder of seven-year-old Louisa Preston at Moira.
- George Ruxbourne – 23 May 1883 – Hanged at Armidale for the murder of Jimmy Young at Armidale.
- William Rice- 23 April 1884 – Hanged at Darlinghurst for the murder of James Griffin at 59 Phelps St, Surry Hills.
- Joseph Cordini – 13 June 1884 – Hanged at Deniliquin Gaol for the murder of George Mizon on the Hay road outside Deniliquin.
- Charles Watson – 14 April 1885 – Hanged at Darlinghurst for the murder of William Matthews in the vicinity of 'Wyadra' and 'Cowl Cowl' stations near Hillston.
- Thomas Williams (alias Frank Johns) – 14 July 1885 – A member of Moonlite's gang of bushrangers; hanged at Darlinghurst Gaol for the attempted murder of a fellow prisoner, William Roberts, at Parramatta Gaol.
- Matthew Friske – 10 December 1885 – Hanged at Grafton Gaol for the murder of "his mate and countryman" Matts Matteson near Coffs Harbour.
- William Liddiard – 8 June 1886 – Hanged at Grafton for the murder of Patrick Noonan near Wardell.
- Alfred Reynolds – 8 October 1886 – Hanged at Darlinghurst for the murder of his wife Rhoda at Gowrie St, Newtown.
- Robert Read – 7 January 1887 – Hanged at Darlinghurst for his involvement in the Mount Rennie rape case.
- George Duffy - 7 January 1887 – Hanged at Darlinghurst for his involvement in the Mount Rennie rape case.
- William Boyce - 7 January 1887 – Hanged at Darlinghurst for his involvement in the Mount Rennie rape case.
- Joseph Martin - 7 January 1887 – Hanged at Darlinghurst for his involvement in the Mount Rennie rape case.
- John Creighan (alias Grace) – 29 May 1888 – Hanged at Armidale for the murder of Jack Stapleton at Hillgrove.
- Robert Hewart – 11 September 1888 – Hanged at Darlinghurst for the murder of Thomas Park in a cell at the Central Police Court.
- Louisa Collins – 8 January 1889 – Hanged at Darlinghurst Gaol for the poisoning murder of her second husband, Michael Collins, at Botany. She was the last woman hanged in New South Wales.
- James Morrison – 19 July 1889 – Hanged at Darlinghurst for the murder of Constable David Sutherland in Macleay St, Potts Point.
- Thomas Reilly – 6 November 1889 – Hanged at Wagga Wagga for the murder of Christian Eppel on the Wagga Common. Reilly was a cousin of Ned Kelly.

== 1890s ==
- Albert Smidt – 18 November 1890 – Hanged at Wagga Wagga for the murder of John Young Taylor near Alfredtown; he was believed to have also murdered Jacob Rick (and possibly one other person).
- Lars Peter Hansen – 2 June 1891 – Hanged at Dubbo Gaol for the murder of Charles Duncker on the Peak Hill road.
- Maurice Dalton – 17 November 1891 – Hanged at Darlinghurst for the murder of his wife Catherine at 1 Foveaux St Surry Hills.
- Harold Dutton Mallalieu – 26 November 1891 – Hanged at Dubbo Gaol for the murder of Jerome Casey on the Moonagee Road near Nyngan.
- Jimmy Tong – 29 November 1892 – Hanged at Armidale for the murder of Harry Hing at Walcha.
- Edward Smedley – 13 June 1893 – Hanged at Darlinghurst for the murder of his wife Phoebe at Quirindi.
- George Archer – 11 July 1893 – Hanged at Darlinghurst for the rape and murder of Emma Harrison at a house in Bourke street, Darlinghurst. Archer's execution was mishandled and he died by strangulation on the rope.
- John Makin – 15 August 1893 – ("The Macdonaldtown Baby Farmer"). Hanged at Darlinghurst for the murder of the infant Horace Murray.
- Woy Hoy (Jimmy Ah Hoy) – 24 November 1893 – Hanged at Mudgee for the murder of Ah Fook in Lewis St, Mudgee.
- Edwin Hubert 'Bertie' Glasson – 29 November 1893 – Hanged at Bathurst for the murder of John William Phillips and Frances Letitia 'Fanny' Cavanough at Carcoar on 23 September 1893. The first prisoner executed at Bathurst Gaol on its present site (opened 1888).
- Charles Montgomery – 31 May 1894 – Hanged at Darlinghurst for the attempted murder of Constable Fred Bowden near the corner of Bridge and Macquarie streets.
- Thomas Williams – 31 May 1894 – Hanged at Darlinghurst for the attempted murder of Constable Fred Bowden near the corner of Bridge and Macquarie streets. Montgomery's death was instantaneous, but Williams died from suffocation after the rope was initially caught under his arm during the drop.
- Alec Lee (alias Joseph Anderson) – 20 July 1894 – Hanged at Tamworth for the murder of William McKay at the Commercial Bank at Barraba.
- John Cummins – 20 July 1894 – Hanged at Tamworth for the murder of William McKay at the Commercial Bank at Barraba.
- Frederick Dennis (alias Frederick Paton) – 11 December 1894 – Hanged at Bathurst Gaol for the murder of John Hall at Fifield on 6 May 1894.
- Alfred Grenon (alias Leporte and Michell) – 7 February 1895 – Hanged at Darlinghurst for the attempted murder of a watchman named Thomas Heavey in Elizabeth Bay Road in Sydney's eastern suburbs. Grenon was the last person to be executed for attempted murder in Australia.
- Thomas Meredith Sheridan – 7 January 1896 – Hanged at Darlinghurst for the murder of Jessie Nicholls, who died at Castlereagh Street from the effects of an illegal abortion. Her mutilated body was found within a packing crate near the water's edge at Wooloomooloo Bay.
- Charles Hines – 21 May 1897 – Hanged at Maitland after being convicted of raping his step-daughter, Mary Emily Hayne, at Ellerston (north-east of Scone in the Hunter Valley). The rapes had been perpetrated at various times between 1891 and 1896, starting when Mary was 13.
- Thomas Moore – 24 June 1897 – Hanged at Dubbo for the murder of Edward Smith at Brennan's Bend on the Darling River near Bourke, on 3 November 1896. The execution at Dubbo Gaol did not go well, with the prisoner being decapitated by the fall.
- Frank Butler – 17 July 1897 – ("The Glenbrook Murders") Hanged at Darlinghurst for the murder of Captain Lee Weller at Glenbrook, in the Blue Mountains near Sydney. After he was sentenced to death, Butler confessed to Weller's murder, as well as the murders of Charles Burgess and Arthur Preston.
- Wong Min – 13 December 1898 – Hanged at Dubbo for the murder of Joe Mong Jong at Warren, New South Wales on 16 August 1898. Also stabbed Alice Spong during same incident.
- Stuart Wilson Christopher Briggs – 5 April 1899 – Hanged at Darlinghurst for the murders of Margaret Dutt and her grandmother, Margaret Millar, at their home in Douglas Street in Petersham.

== 1900s ==
- John Sleigh (alias Ward) – 6 December 1900 – Hanged at Goulburn for the murder of Frank "Bones" Curran at Back Creek, near Bombala.
- Jackie Underwood – 14 January 1901 – Indigenous. Hanged at Dubbo for the murder of Percival Mawbey at Breelong. He and Jimmy Governor also killed Helen Josephine Kerz, Mrs Sarah Mawbey, Grace Mawbey and Hilda Mawbey in the same incident.
- Jimmy Governor – 18 January 1901 – Indigenous. Hanged at Darlinghurst for the murder of Helen Josephine Kerz at Breelong. In the same incident he and Jackie Underwood also killed Mrs. Sarah Mawbey, Grace Mawbey, Percival Mawbey and Hilda Mawbey. Jimmy and his brother Joe also killed Alexander McKay near Ulan, Elizabeth O'Brien and her baby son at Poggie, near Merriwa, and Keiran Fitzpatrick near Wollar.
- Joseph Campbell – 20 December 1901 – Hanged at Darlinghurst for the rape of nine-year-old Violet Oldfield at Queanbeyan. He had also raped another nine-year-old at Ramsay's Bush (Haberfield)
- Thomas Moore – 14 April 1903 – Indigenous. Hanged at Darlinghurst for the rape and murder of ten-year-old Janet Irene Smith at Ramsay's Bush, Leichhardt (now Haberfield).
- Digby Grand – 7 July 1903 – Hanged at Darlinghurst for the murder of Police Constable Samuel Long at Auburn.
- Henry Jones – 7 July 1903 – Hanged at Darlinghurst for the murder of Police Constable Samuel Long at Auburn.
- Ah Chick (or Check) – 28 June 1904 – Hanged at Dubbo for the murder of William Tregaskis at Peak Hill, New South Wales.
- John Raymond Brown – 11 December 1906 – Hanged at Grafton Gaol for the murders of Daniel O'Keefe, Margaret O'Keefe and Patrick Gillick at German Creek, near Ballina (now called Empire Vale).
- Peter Sadeek – 11 June 1907 – Hanged at Broken Hill Gaol for the murder of Mary Cooney (or Jewson) at White Cliffs.
- Nicholas Baxter – 29 October 1907 – Hanged at Darlinghurst for the murder of Mary MacNamara at 2 Sarah St Enmore.
- George Toffts – 26 November 1907 – Hanged at Tamworth Gaol for the murder of Eliza Maud Fletcher at Quirindi.

== 1910s to 1930s ==
- William Frederick Ball – 17 June 1912 – Hanged at Armidale Gaol for the murder of his wife, Lois Ball, near Bingara.
- Frank Franz – 20 December 1916 – Hanged at Bathurst for the murder of Police Constable George Joss Duncan at Tottenham.
- Roland Nicholas Kennedy – 20 December 1916 – Hanged at Bathurst for the murder of Police Constable George Joss Duncan at Tottenham.
- James Wilson – 31 May 1917 – Hanged at Long Bay Gaol for the murder of George Pappageorgi at Haymarket, Sydney.
- Christian William Benzing – 16 June 1917 – Hanged at Long Bay for the rape and murder of eleven-year-old Dorothy Myra Small at Rockdale.
- Edward Williams – 29 April 1924 – Hanged at Long Bay for the murder of his three children, five-year-old Rosalie, three-year-old Mary and two-year-old Cecillia at Underwood St Paddington.
- William George Gordon Simpson – 10 December 1924 – Hanged at Long Bay for the murders of Guy Chalmers Clift and Police Constable James Flynn at Appin.
- William Cyril Moxley – 17 August 1932 – Hanged at Long Bay for the murders of Dorothy Ruth Denzel and Frank Barnby Wilkinson at Moorebank.
- Edwin John Hickey – 14 May 1936 – Hanged at Long Bay for the murder of former Conciliation Commissioner Montague Henwood on the train between Faulconbridge and Linden. Hickey was 17 at the time of the crime, making him the last juvenile offender to be executed in Australia.
- James Leighton Massey – 15 June 1936 – Hanged at Long Bay for the murder of Norman Samuel McLaren Stead at Darlinghurst.
- Alfred Spicer – 26 May 1938 – Hanged at Long Bay for the rape and murder of six-year-old Marcia Hayes at Windsor.
- John Trevor Kelly – 24 August 1939 – Hanged at Long Bay for the murder of Marjorie Constance Sommerlad at Tenterfield. He was the last person to be judicially executed in the state of New South Wales.

== Abolition of the death penalty ==
In October 1954 the New South Wales State Cabinet of the Cahill Labor government decided to amend the Crimes Act to abolish the death penalty. Until that date judges in New South Wales were bound to impose death sentences to persons convicted of murder, rape and other serious crimes. After August 1939 the Executive Council had automatically commuted death sentences to a term of imprisonment. In 1955, with the Labor party in control of both houses of the State Parliament, New South Wales abolished the death penalty for crimes such as murder and rape. Crimes such as treason and piracy remained as legislated capital offences until 1985.
