= Ann Davis (convict) =

Woman executed in New South Wales (1758–1789)

- Born: c. 1758
- Died: 23 November 1789 (aged 30–31); Sydney
- Known for: First woman legally executed in New South Wales
- Convictions: Theft (1786); Creating a disturbance (February 1789); Theft (November 1789)
- Penalty: Transportation (1786); Flogging (February 1789); Hanging (November 1789)

Ann Davis (c. 1758–1789) was the first woman to be legally executed in the Colony of New South Wales. She arrived in Sydney as a convict on board the First Fleet in January 1788 and was executed on 23 November the next year after being convicted of stealing clothing. The trial that led to Davis's execution was the first to involve a civilian jury in the colony, with twelve women being empanelled to assess whether she was pregnant after a jury of male military personnel found her to be guilty.

== Biography ==
=== Transportation ===
Davis was born in 1758. She married William Davis. In April 1786 she was convicted of stealing eight pairs of silk stockings at a trial held at the Old Bailey in London. The stockings had a value of 8 shillings. Davis was sentenced to transportation for a period of seven years.

In May 1787 Davis departed England on board the Lady Penrhyn, one of the ships of the First Fleet that was tasked with establishing a penal colony in Australia. The ship arrived at Sydney in January 1788.

Davis was accused of committing further crimes during the second year of the colony at Sydney. In January 1789 she faced trial on charges of stealing a shirt from a female convict and was acquitted. The next month she was convicted of creating a disturbance and was sentenced to 25 lashes of a whip.

=== Execution ===
On 14 November 1789 Davis was arrested for breaking into a male convict's house and stealing clothing, with the items being found in her possession. She claimed that another woman had given her the clothes, but this was soon dismissed.

Davis faced trial in front of David Collins, the Judge Advocate of New South Wales, on 21 November 1789. The trial was completed that day, with Davis being found guilty by a jury comprising only military personnel; such juries were the norm in the colony at the time.

After the judge sentenced Davis to death, she stated that she was pregnant in an attempt to avoid execution. This led to twelve female convicts who had given birth being empanelled as a jury of matrons to assess the claim. After examining Davis, the forewoman—who was aged between 60 and 70—told the court "Gentlemen, She is as much with child as I am". The women who examined Davis were the first civilians to serve as jurists for a criminal trial in New South Wales. Juries to assess claims of pregnancy were the most important role women were allowed to undertake in the British legal system at the time, continuing arrangements that had been in place for over 400 years.

Davis was executed by hanging on 23 November 1789. She was drunk at the time of her hanging and two women needed to help her to stand upright. Collins recorded that Davis "died generally reviled and unpitied by the people of her own description". Writing in 2020 for the Dictionary of Sydney, Rachel Franks described Davis's execution as a "sad end".
