= Mount Rennie rape case =

1886 Australian legal case

The Mount Rennie rape case was a gang rape in Sydney, Australia, in the 1880s that led to a full conviction of at least some of the participants involved in the crime—young larrikins of the "Waterloo Push". The attack is sometimes referred to as the "Mount Rennie Outrage" or the "Waterloo Outrage". The crime was a pivotal point in New South Wales history, coming after a history of failure of other gang-rape trials in that time period.

== Crime ==
The gang rape occurred on 9 September 1886. Sixteen-year-old Mary Jane Hicks had been educated at the Bathurst convent school, then worked as a domestic servant at Katoomba, and at a hotel and private houses in Sydney. While walking to a city employment registry, she was offered a lift by Charles Sweetman, the driver of a hansom cab, who instead drove her in his cab to what is now the Moore Park area, then an isolated piece of bushland in the suburb of Waterloo and called Mount Rennie. He attempted to molest her in the cab but she screamed for help. Two young men approached and took her out of the cab, purporting to save her from disgrace. At this point, Sweetman departed with his cab.

The young men walked Hicks to a different isolated location, where they were joined by several others, some of whom began to take turns in raping her. The girl's screaming was heard by a passerby, William Stanley, who attempted to rescue her but was driven off by the gang with bricks, stones, and bottles. Stanley ran to distant Redfern police station, where he reported the crime at about 4 p.m. When the police arrived on the scene at 5 p.m., they interrupted the crime, which was still in progress, but were unable to apprehend any of the fleeing offenders. Following inquiries, twelve men were identified and eventually arrested, including Charles Sweetman, the cabman. At least one reporter formed the view that Sweetman had deliberately planned to deliver a girl to the Push members, who were assembled and waiting for the purpose.

The victim, Mary Jane Hicks, testified that she had fallen into and out of consciousness during the ordeal, but gave evidence that at least eight men held her down and took turns raping her, and that many others were present, including some who had not been apprehended.

== Public reaction ==
The rape caused a media frenzy of outrage and sensation in Sydney. The Sydney press focused on the brutal nature of the perpetrators. The Sydney Daily Telegraph newspaper described the crime as one "which no parallel can be found in the crimes of civilized life or in the savageries of barbarism". The Sydney Bulletin instead argued that Hicks was an "unfortunate", or in other words, a prostitute. It focused on her lack of virginity. Crucially, however, it ignored Hicks's claim that she had been raped at the age of fourteen by a married man. Geoffrey Partington notes that the Bulletin likened the incident to British oppression of the Irish. He notes that the Bulletin accused the then-Governor of New South Wales, Lord Carrington, of "dragging from the grave the skeletons of the poor wretched ignorant boys whom he sent to the gallows in deference to the laws of a convict colony that has not even yet emerged from beneath the shadow of the gaol wall". However, in an editorial leader, The Sydney Morning Herald maintained that the youths had received a fair trial, and that capital punishment for rape had been confirmed by legislation only three years earlier. Therefore, the sentences should be carried out unless there were legitimate grounds for reprieve in any individual case.

== Trials ==
The trial of the accused youths was conducted over six consecutive days, 22–27 November inclusive. Detailed reports were printed in the Herald and are available online. William Hill, George Duffy, William Newman, Michael Donnellan, Joseph Martin, William Boyce, Hugh Miller, George Keegan, Robert Read, Thomas Oscroft, and Michael Mangan were tried for the crime. Justice Windeyer declared it a "most atrocious crime, a crime so horrible that every lover of his country must feel that it is a disgrace to our civilization". The first nine men were convicted and sentenced to death; the last two were acquitted. All but one were reportedly under 20 years of age.

After a separate trial, Charles Sweetman received a 14-year prison sentence for his part, plus 50 lashes, to be handed out on two occasions.

== Appeals for clemency ==
A public campaign was waged, advocating that execution was too harsh for the nine condemned youths. Before the end of the year, the state's Executive Council reviewed all the sentences and commuted three to life imprisonment on the grounds of "mitigating circumstances".

A public meeting was convened at the Sydney Town Hall on 29 December, with the purpose of petitioning the governor to exercise his power to reprieve all the condemned youths. A deputation of 150 citizens attended the governor in support of the hanging. They succeeded in having two more of the sentences commuted to life imprisonment, albeit their first three years were to be served in fetters. The remaining four—Read, Duffy, Martin, and Boyce—were to be hanged at Darlinghurst Gaol on 7 January 1887. Those who had been reprieved were all released from prison in November 1896, exactly ten years after their convictions.

== Executions ==
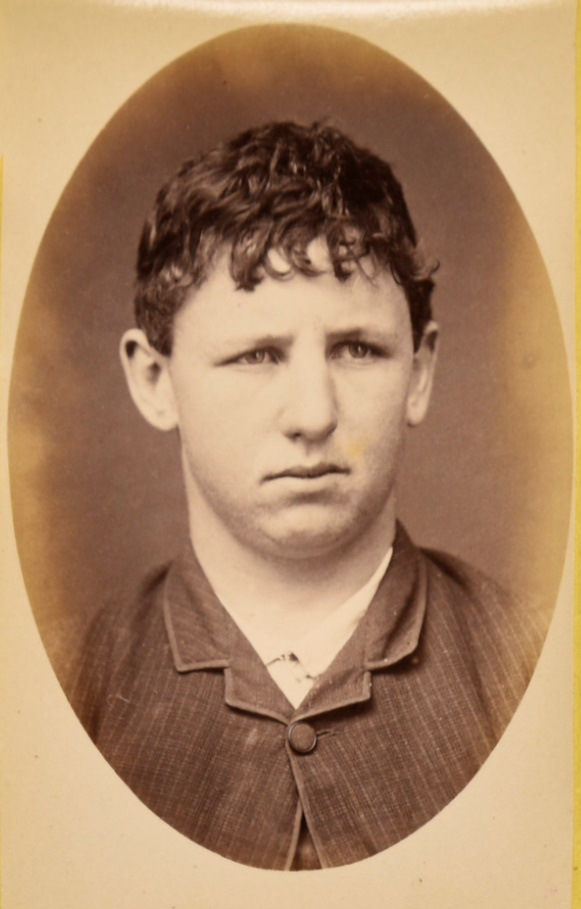
George Duffy, aged 18 years

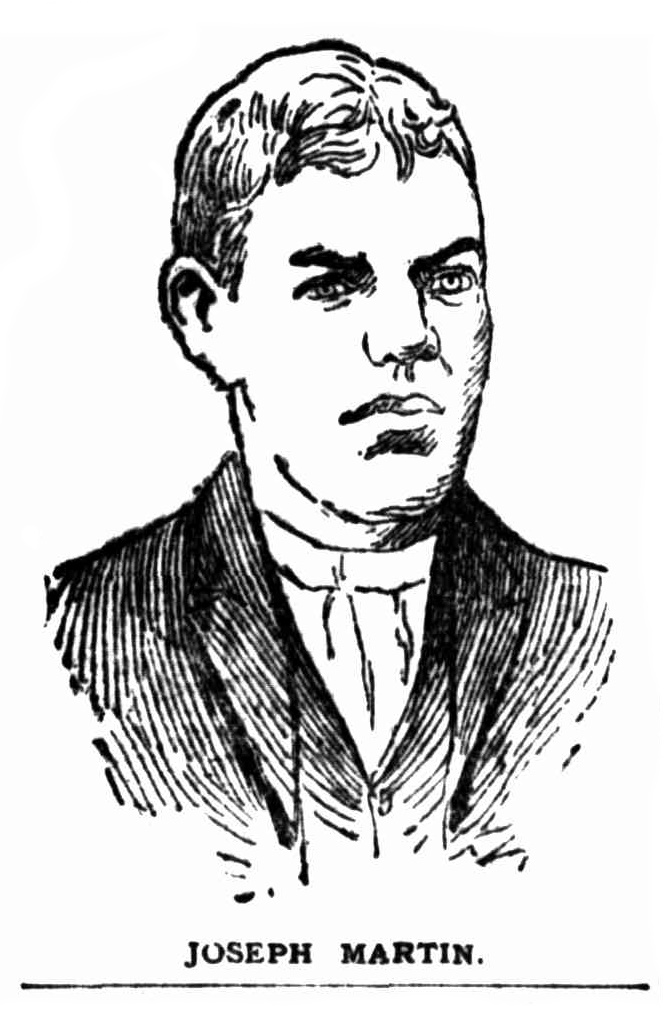
Joseph Martin, aged 17 years

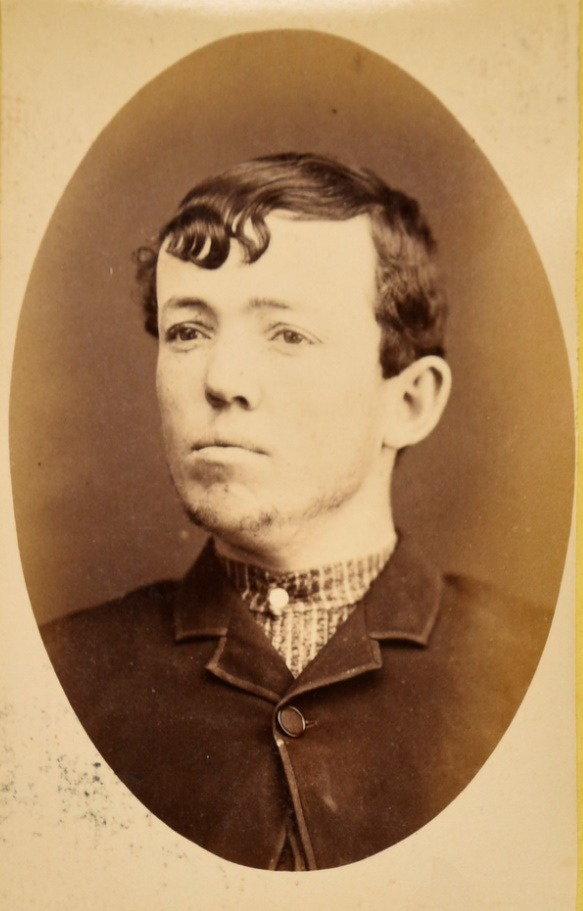
William Boyce, aged 20 years

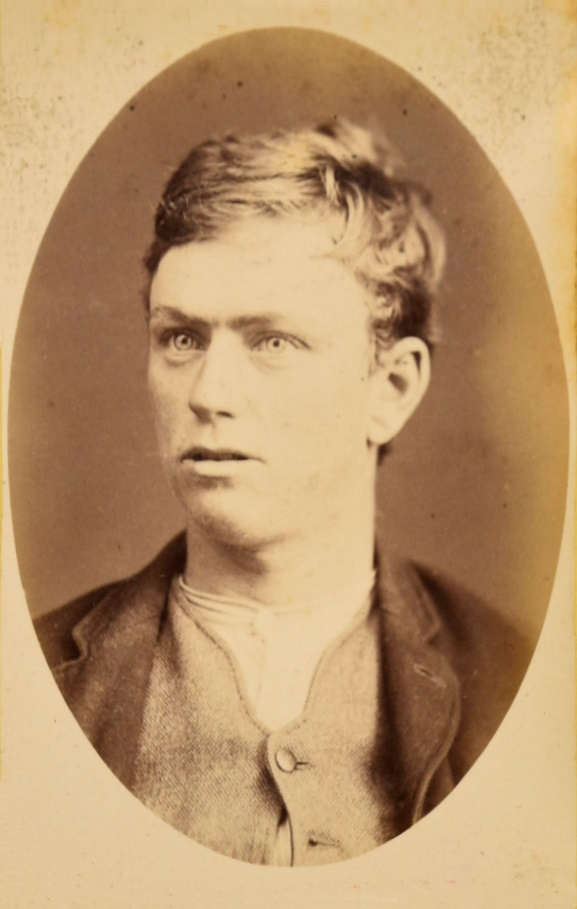
Robert George Read, aged 19 years

The four convicts in the Mount Rennie rape case who were executed

Some two thousand people were estimated to have massed outside the prison on the day, but only those with reputable credentials were admitted to witness the executions. The executioner, Robert Howard, botched the hangings when he miscalculated the drop necessary for the youths. One died instantly but the remaining three struggled for several minutes.

== Aftermath ==
The trial was dramatised in a 2012 ABC docudrama, the first of a three-part series entitled Australia on Trial. Presented by historian Michael Cathcart, the script was based on official court transcripts of the trial.

Historian Brett Hinch traced the life of Mary Jane Hicks after the trial and documented that she moved to New Zealand, where she died six years later, aged 22.

== Sources ==
- Barker, Anthony (2001). What Happened When: A Chronology of Australia from 1788. Allen & Unwin. p. 52. ISBN 1-86508-426-3.
- Cossins, Anne (2000). Masculinities, Sexualities and Child Sexual Abuse. Martinus Nijhoff Publishers. ISBN 90-411-1355-X.
- Gleeson, Kate. From Centenary to the Olympics, Gang Rape in Sydney.
- Partington, Geoffrey (July 1999). The Samuel Griffith Society — Chapter Eight: Republicanism and the Repudiation of post-1788 Australia. Proceedings of the Eleventh Conference of The Samuel Griffith Society. Archived from the original on 23 September 2008.
- Peers, Juliet. Accept any Woman's Word? Rape and Republicanism. The Body Beneath the Foundation Stone. Journal of Australian Studies 47 (1996) 123–146.
- Simon, Rita James (2001). A Comparative Perspective on Major Social Problems. Lexington Books. p. 18. ISBN 0-7391-0248-6.
