= Duncan Mackellar, Junior =

Australian Royal Navy officer (1795–1838)

Lieutenant Duncan Mackellar or Duncan Mackellar, Junior (1795–1838) was an officer in the Royal Navy and, subsequently, a colonial settler, of New South Wales. With his uncle, Captain Duncan Mackellar, he is associated with the early days of colonial settlement of the district around what is now Braidwood.

== Biography ==
Duncan Mackellar, Junior, was born in Sydney, during the time that his father, Neil Mackellar (1769–1802) was stationed there, as an ensign of the New South Wales Corps. His father was a nephew of Colonel Patrick Mackellar (1717–1778) and a first cousin of Colonel Mackellar's eldest son, John, later Admiral Sir John Mackellar (1768–1854). His mother was a convict woman, Sarah Cooley. In 1800, his father had reached the rank of Captain and became secretary and aide-de-camp to Governor Philip Gidley King. His father sailed to New Bedford, en route to England bringing dispatches, in the American schooner Caroline. After August 1802, no news had been heard of that vessel, and he was presumed to have been lost at sea.

Mackellar joined the Royal Navy, on 1 June 1808, joining the crew of HMS Porpoise in Sydney. Porpoise was the ship which had carried William Bligh to take up his appointment as Governor of New South Wales. It is likely that his father's former position and the circumstances of his father's death influenced Bligh to assist Mackellar to begin a naval career. However, by the time that Mackellar actually joined the navy, the colony was already under a rebel de facto government, following the Rum Rebellion, which had occurred on 26 January 1808. Porpoise played a significant role in the aftermath of the rebellion, taking Bligh, who had been held under house arrest, to Hobart, in early 1809.

Mackellar went to England, aboard Porpoise, in 1810. He was a Midshipman, aboard HMS Guadeloupe, on 27 June 1811, when, outgunned and outnumbered, over an hour and 35 minutes, the brig successfully fought off the French corvette Tactique and armed xebec Guêpe, off the French town of Port-Vendre.

In 1815, he served on Salisbury, commanded by Captain John Mackellar, his first cousin once-removed, who would eventually rise to the rank of Admiral and be knighted.

He was promoted to Lieutenant, in May 1816, on his last naval ship, HMS Variable, soon afterwards retiring on half pay, in August 1816. As a former Lieutenant of only eight years service in the navy, he was not permitted to retain or use his military rank in civilian life.

His sister Lilias was involved in a scandal, in Hobart in 1817, culminating in her trial and acquittal on a charge of murdering a child who was conceived as a result of her adulterous relationship with John Drummond, husband of her sister, Elizabeth. Drummond and a servant woman, Mary Evers, were also charged, tried and acquitted. By order of Governor Macquarie, at Drummond's request, details of the trial were suppressed, by not being published in the Sydney Gazette, to avoid embarrassing Drummond's family in Britain.

In 1825, he returned to Australia, with his wife and two children aboard the City of Edinburgh, a ship commanded by his uncle, also Duncan Mackellar, and owned by The Australian Company, of Edinburgh and Leith, in Scotland.

Mackellar's wife (Janet Jane née Leitch) was murdered, by an assigned convict, in the district of 'Upper Minto' (which extended as far south as modern-day Appin), near the Cowpastures, in 1828, while her husband was away at "the New Country". The New Country probably refers to the newer areas of settlement, at the time, which would include Braidwood where Mackellar was preparing to move onto the land granted to him. As a consequence of his loss and the earlier destruction of his house in a fire, Mackellar was given a second land grant by Governor Darling.

Mackellar took up, with his uncle, Duncan Mackellar, a combined total of 3250 acres of land, near what is now the town of Braidwood, in 1829. His uncle's land, 'Strathalan', was sold, in 1836, to another sea captain who became a settler, Captain John Coghill, former captain of the East India Company's convict transport ship Mangles. Coghill later built 'Bedervale'. Mackellar, Junior's, own two land grants, Jinglemoney and Gingamona, of 640 acres each, were west of the Shoalhaven River, in the vicinity of Bombay, in the County of Murray. He also had the right to graze on another 3000 acres of adjacent land that had not been granted or sold yet, or was otherwise not in immediate use, in return for an annual rental payment.

A "Duncan McKellar", of the County of Murray, died in Sydney on Friday, 2 November 1838. After his death, Mackellar's landholdings were held in trust for his three sons. His uncle had previously returned to Scotland, in 1837, and was living there, in 1839.

One of his sons was Alexander Mackellar (1821–1904), who was associated with the Australian Jockey Club and the foundation of Randwick Racecourse.

It is likely that two streets in Braidwood, Duncan Street and Mackellar Street, are named after Mackellar and his identically named uncle.

== See also ==
- History of Braidwood, New South Wales
