= History of Braidwood, New South Wales =

Braidwood and Its Setting
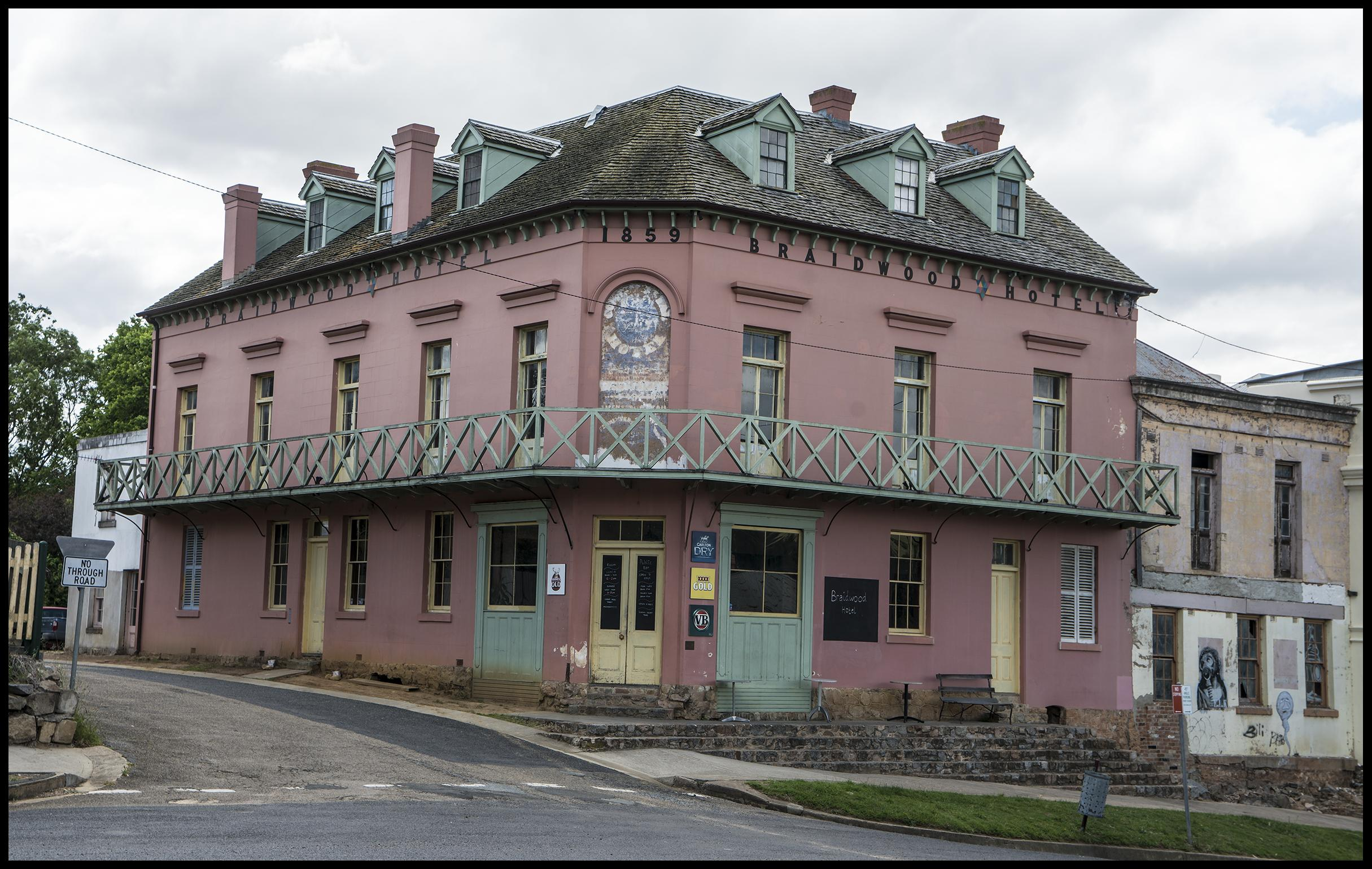
- Braidwood Hotel, 2017

- Location within New South Wales Location within Australia
- 35.4435°S 149.8056°E
- Location: Braidwood, Queanbeyan-Palerang Region, New South Wales, Australia

History
- Built: 1839–

Site notes
- Architect(s): Original survey and plan by James Larmer; 1839
- Owner: Alexandra Rea; Braidwood Hotel

New South Wales Heritage Register
- Official name: Braidwood and Its Setting; Braidwood; Braidwood Farm; Jellamatong
- Type: state heritage (conservation area)
- Designated: 3 April 2006
- Reference no.: 1749
- Type: Townscape
- Category: Urban Area

The history of Braidwood, New South Wales in Australia dates back to the early nineteenth century. The historic nature of the town has been recognised with the listing of the entire town on the former Register of the National Estate on 21 October 1980 and the New South Wales State Heritage Register on 3 April 2006.

== History ==
=== Early European settlement 1822–1839 ===
==== Exploration ====
Europeans first entered the upper Shoalhaven River basin in 1822 under instruction from the new Governor, Thomas Brisbane, to investigate the possibility of a track between the Limestone Plains and Batemans Bay. The reports of good country would have stimulated land selection in the area.

==== Land ====
The system of land grants available in the 1820s were attractive to settlers. A free grant of 640 acres of land (one square mile) was given to a selector for every £500 of money or stock held, with a limit of 2000 acres, shortly afterwards increased to 2560 (four square miles). Captain Duncan Mackellar, one of the earliest settlers in the area, was granted 2000 acres in 1822 with which he selected the property "Strathallan". However it appears he didn't move onto the land until about 1829.

==== County and parish settlement model ====
When Governor Darling succeeded Governor Brisbane in 1825 he brought from London a new set of Instructions providing for the colony to be settled according to the English pattern of counties (approx 40 miles by 40 miles). The county boundaries were to generally follow natural features such as streams and ranges and were to have a county town and be divided again into hundreds (11 square miles) and parishes (25 square miles). The parishes were to be, as they were in England, a support for the Church of England that would eventually have a church, burial ground and parsonage in each parish. When the number of people allowed, parish local government of the English kind could be adopted.

The Church and Schools corporation was to have one seventh of the land in each county for support of the Church of England. However it soon became apparent that the sparse populations in outer-lying areas would not support such a system, unlike in the densely populated areas such as Sydney.

==== Early survey instructions to Hoddle ====
Survey of the County of St Vincent had commenced in 1824 in the most northerly area. By December 1827 Assistant Surveyor Robert Hoddle (who later surveyed Melbourne) reported that the Shoalhaven had been traced to its source. Earlier in October that year Surveyor General of New South Wales John Oxley instructed Hoddle to mark out land grants for intending settlers in the County of St Vincent.

The Anglican Church received priority treatment being allocated one seventh of the whole county consisting of the best land on the east bank of the Shoalhaven River. The Church and School Estate comprised approx 42,000 acres on the east side of the Shoalhaven River with a straight north–south boundary as the estate's east edge. This boundary line had significant ramifications for the subsequent land settlement pattern with Strathallan, Braidwood Farm and Coghill's land all granted east of this line. Even though the Church and School Estate was resumed c. 1835 the legacy of its land allocation remains clearly visible in the landscape today. Other settlers authorised to take possession of land were:

Dr Wilson RN 2560 acres grant,
Mr D Mackellar 2000 acres grant,
Mr Coghill 2000 acres grant
Mr Coghill 4000 acres purchase
Mr Ryrie 2560 acres grant
Mr Francis Dixon 2000 acres grant
Mr Francis Dixon 2000 acres purchase
Mr George Bunn 2560 grant
Mr D Mackellar Junior 640 grant

Oxley's instructions stated "These are the only settlers who have any title to land in the vicinity of Mt Solus (Mt Gillamatong)".

According to the census of October 1828 there were approximately 90 Europeans living in the area however few property owners were resident on their grant. After 1831 free grants of land ceased but the remaining land suitable for pastoral development was soon sold.

==== Early European Settlers ====
Captain Duncan Mackellar

Three property holders feature significantly in Braidwood's establishment. Captain Duncan Mackellar and family joined his identically-named nephew, Duncan Mackellar, Junior, at Strathallan in about 1829 and to their combined land grants of 3250, added another 4000 by purchase. Mackellar had one of the larger and more centrally located properties in the 19th County (St Vincent) and played a key role in the area until he sold the property in 1836. The bulk of the land was sold to John Coghill who owned the property on which Bedervale now stands. A small portion of land adjoining the "Jellamatong" (spellings vary) village reserve was sold to Dr Thomas Braidwood Wilson whose land adjoined Strathallan to the south.

Thomas Braidwood Wilson

Wilson had selected 2560 acres earlier, but it was not until 1836 that he settled on "Braidwood Farm" with his wife and two children. Wilson had been a Surgeon Superintendent of ships taking convicts to NSW and Van Diemen's Land. He was first granted land in Van Diemen's Land in 1824, which he exchanged for land near Lake George in 1825. In addition he was given 2560 acres which he selected in the "new country" on 2 tributaries of the Shoalhaven, Monkittee and Flood creeks. Surveyor Hoddle was instructed in 1827 to survey it before all other grants promised in the area.

In 1833 the western end of Wilson's grant was resumed and reserved for a future village and a similar area added to the eastern end in compensation. Wilson was a humane and progressive thinker and it would seem that his settling in the area was encouraged by the administration. Wilson visited "Braidwood Farm" when he was in the colony but it was not until late 1836 that he settled there with his wife and family. He became a community leader and amongst other things contracted to build the first courthouse in 1837–38. In 1840 Wilson petitioned the government to build a road from Braidwood to Huskisson (The Wool Road) to enable faster and cheaper shipping of the wool clip to Sydney and, with Col John Mackenzie, supplied the materials and labour for the Braidwood to Nerriga section.

In 1841 Braidwood Farm had 141 residents, twice the number on Coghill's combined properties of Bedervale and Strathallan. Although the drought had broken in 1840, the subsequent depression sent Wilson bankrupt and he died in November 1843. His land was sold to John Coghill for (Pounds)2,000 who now owned all the land on the south, east and north of the town. Before his death, Wilson had purchased the block immediately to the north of Braidwood. He was buried on this block, high on the hill overlooking the town. A memorial and large pine tree clearly mark the site, from which there are superb views of the town.

John Coghill

John Coghill was an astute businessman and manager. He had also managed a property for John Oxley, Surveyor General, near Camden, from which he ran a merchandising depot. Coghill had acquired the Bedervale property c. 1827-28 and visited frequently. He occasionally sat as a magistrate on the bench with Duncan Mackellar and made submissions to the colonial secretary on matters that affected the future of the area. In the mid to late 1830s Coghill engaged John Verge, well known colonial architect, to draw up house plans, and the house was completed by about 1842. It was also in the mid to late 1830s that Coghill purchased Strathallan.

While on a trip overseas John Coghill's daughter Elizabeth married Robert Maddrell, who came from the Isle of Man and was studying medicine at Heidelberg University. They returned to Australia and inherited Bedervale on Coghill's death in 1853. The property included Braidwood Farm which Maddrell renamed Mona, the original name for his birthplace, the Isle of Man. Under Robert Maddrell's management the estate expanded to 33,000 acres, much of it farmed by tenant farmers. By 1860, Robert Maddrell had 84 tenants on the three large Maddrell properties that surrounded Braidwood. Portions of these farms were eventually sold to the tenants, but in 1882 Robert Maddrell still had 52,000 acres.

Most significantly however, the ownership of the land on the north, east and south of the town by one family resulted in the town boundary on these sides remaining virtually intact and the landscape remaining large open paddocks, although there has been some recent subdivision and modification to this cultural landscape.

==== Nineteen Counties ====
The Colonial Office in London attempted to impose a policy of closer settlement in the Instructions given to the incoming Governor Darling in 1825. The size of free grants was limited to 2,560 acres and purchases to 9,600 acres. Settled land was to be surveyed, and land was not to be granted before the area was surveyed. The arrival of these orders threw the administration into confusion. It had no such surveyed area ready, and no surveyors available. On the other hand, it had promised land to many recently arrived settlers who could not now be denied it or kept long in waiting. To meet its promises it had a line, the "Limits of Location", drawn around the outlying patches of settlement. Within this line settlers could select their land without prior survey. The area within the "Limits of Location" was subdivided into nineteen counties, however further division into "hundreds" was abandoned outside the County of Cumberland. Parish boundaries continued to be surveyed until 1830. Each county was to have a county town being the chief market, and administrative centre, with major courts for civil and criminal justice. However most counties did not have sufficient population to support such a town. The Nineteen Counties were not finally proclaimed until 1835.

==== Survey Grid ====
The preferred method of land survey at the time was effectively to lay a rectangular grid over the land surface, preferably in advance of settlement so that selected blocks could be accurately located. This was the system adopted earlier in the United States and such a survey system commenced in NSW in 1821. However, Governor Darling's instructions from London of 1825 required that the natural boundaries of the counties (rivers and ranges) be surveyed for valuation purposes before any more land could be alienated. Consequently, the few available surveyors were set to mapping rivers and ranges directly, rather than by plotting them in the course of extending a series of grid lines as was done in much of the United States.

In NSW grid lines, often of one square mile, were drawn on the maps that had been made from surveying natural features, and transferred to the ground piecemeal and as required by persons selecting isolated areas for purchase. At the time, there was a shortage of skilled surveyors and equipment and irregularities appeared. Rather than determine true north, surveyors usedmagnetic bearings, which changed each year, and locally, according to compass deviation. This was further complicated by worn equipment and as a consequence of this piecemeal approach certain boundary lines failed to meet at right angles. This probably explains why Braidwood's town boundary does not run parallel to the street grid, particularly on the eastern side.

==== Village reserves set aside ====
In the settlement model of the time, there was to be a village to each parish (twenty-five square miles) and so surveyors allowed for village reserves approximately 5 miles apart. Hoddle set aside reserves for future townships including one near Kurraduckbidgee (Arn Prior), one centrally located (the present site of Braidwood) and another further south where Jembaicumbene Creek enters the Shoalhaven. The central village reserve, known as "Jillamatong" after the nearby mountain, was sited on Thomas Braidwood Wilson's land grant adjacent to the church reserve. Wilson's block was extended on the east boundary to compensate for the loss of the reserved land.

==== Police districts ====
The Colonial Office in London had instructed Governor Darling to establish a settlement and administration pattern based on the English model with the church playing a major role. However, the system of effective local government that emerged in the penal colony in the 1830s was one of police districts with a professional paid police magistrate as the local administrator. Police district boundaries as drawn by Governor Gipps in 1840 varied from the county boundaries, and counties and parishes survived only in the land survey as a means of describing allotments in deeds and, for much of the century, also as statistical areas for collecting population and agricultural data. Braidwood became the centre of the "Braidwood Police District".

==== Convictism ====
In the official 1828 census, of the 18 landholders listed in the County of St Vincent only five had their proprietor in residence. The official population of the area in that year was about 90, of whom fifty percent were convicts serving their sentence, eleven percent were ex convicts and seven percent had tickets of leave. A settler could apply for 8 convict servants for every 640 acres and an extra convict for each additional 160 acres. The convicts were an essential part of the labour force, particularly in the newly opened and remote areas. The rapid spread of settlement raised concerns, especially back in London, of the colonial administration's ability to control and service the broad and sparsely populated area.

NSW in the 1820s and 30s was still primarily a penal colony. The British Government was determined that it should be seen as a place of punishment and so act as a deterrent against crime, and frequent directives to the NSW Governor attempted to make the administration in the colony more severe and effective. Transportation itself was the primary punishment, but a series of secondary punishments were thought to be necessary to control the large convict population in a "jail without walls".

At the same time convicts also had rights under the law. No settler was supposed to punish his own assigned men. Minor offences were to be brought before a bench of one or two magistrates. In the 1820s magistrates were local settlers and figures of authority. Before 1832 a magistrate hearing cases by himself could order a maximum of 150 lashes. After 1832 this was reduced to a maximum of 50 lashes. More serious cases were taken before the quarter session of a Supreme Court at Bungonia or Berrima. The police district evolved as the form of local government in the 1830s, superseding the parish and country model.

==== Need for local court and lockup ====
Prior to the town of Braidwood being established, Captain Duncan Mackellar of Strathallan was appointed to the bench (1833) and allocated a policeman and a scourger (flogger) to assist in his administration, and he became the most important magistrate in the area. The other senior appointed magistrate, Major Elrington (reportedly known locally as "the flogging Major"), was further to the south and he too had a constable. The fact that there were only two unmounted constables in the vast Braidwood district, and no lockup, was the subject of constant complaint to the Colonial Secretary by the settlers.

==== Courthouse influences the town's location ====
The magistrate carried out most functions of government and required a courthouse and a lockup gaol. This was often the reason behind the planning of a town since the surveyor general would resist the idea of choosing sites for official buildings without reference to the town plan as a whole. The town created a promising commercial site, especially as the Surveyor General usually consulted residents as to which village reserve would most effectively serve their needs.

When the Government agreed to build a courthouse and lockup in the district they recognised that it would form the nucleus of a future town and considered representations from local land-holders. Coghill suggested the more southerly village reserve on the junction of Jembaicumbene Creek and Shoalhaven River primarily because of the more reliable water supply. However Mackellar, as the local senior magistrate, wanted it closer to Strathallan. Consequently, the "Jillamatong" reserve was chosen, and the courthouse and lockup built by the enterprising Thomas Braidwood Wilson in 1837–38.

In addition to the lockup at the rear of the court, a barracks for 6 mounted police and horses was constructed on the north side of Monkittee Creek on the edge of the police paddock. The courthouse, lockup, barracks and pound keepers hut are the only structures shown on the map that Larmer drew prior to his survey of the village which was gazetted on 24 April 1839. The plan was a standard grid with streets one and a half chains wide (99 feet). First land auction was 9 July 1840 with blocks half an acre in size.

Various factors led to the cessation of convict transportation in NSW in 1840. However the policy of assigning convicts to settlers as cheap labour ended by mid 1839 and by the late 1840s there were only a few convicts left in the region, as even those commuted to life sentence in 1839 were eligible for a ticket of leave by 1847. The judicial system necessary for managing the "jail without walls" was directly responsible for the district town being located in the "Jillamatong" village reserve, and for the first buildings erected in the town. Ironically however, at about the time the courthouse and lockup were completed, and the town gazetted, the convict era had virtually ended.

=== Establishment of the town ===
==== Early town planning in NSW ====
An official passion for rectangular order extended to the new country towns in NSW. Few were laid out before 1830, but Governor Darling promulgated planning regulations in his anxiety to bring all aspects of colonial administration into a rigid system. His new regulations, which were published in the Sydney Gazette in May 1829, emphasised uniformity and regularity as their guiding principles. Officials disagreed on the best width for town streets in hot climates such as NSW. Surveyor General TL Mitchell preferred the narrow shady streets of Spain where he had served in the Peninsular War. Some who had served in India argued that wide streets were preferable as they allowed the circulation of breezes.

Governor Darling was of the India faction and fixed the main streets at 120 feet, including 10-foot pedestrian paths on each side, with cross streets of 84 feet. The main and cross streets formed a rectangular grid enclosing blocks of half acre allotments. Builders were required to set houses back fourteen feet from their front boundaries. Although there was opportunity to vary the plan to accommodate form and natural features, often this did not occur. While Surveyor General Mitchell explored the opportunities of town planning within the grid system (e.g. Maitland), most surveyors applied the plan in a conventional manner.

Braidwood is a very good surviving example of a colonial Georgian town plan with its simple grid still largely intact. Several people influenced its shape. Hoddle defined the outer perimeter (and presumably selected the location) of the "Jillamatong" reserve by resuming the western half-mile of T B Wilson's property. James Larmer prepared the draft plan in accordance with Governor Darling's model. In 1839 Wilson wrote to the colonial secretary asking that the original plan of Braidwood village be altered to include a park opposite the courthouse (which he had just built). He thought the reserve would enhance the building and be valued by the residents as a market place and for recreation. Surveyor General Mitchell was clearly progressive and far-sighted in his thinking, and among other things, appeared keen for a town plan to be adapted to the physical and social dimensions of a place. Mitchell instructed Larmer to amend the town plan in accordance with Wilson's suggestion.

The "Reserve for Public Recreation" initially set aside by Larmer was in the south east of the town, but larger than its present size. The reserve may have been reduced to its present size to compensate for the land set aside for the reserve at the intersection of Wilson and Wallace Streets. Eventually the "Jillamatong" Village Reserve became known as Braidwood, presumably after Wilson's adjacent homestead Braidwood Farm.

==== Early development in the town ====
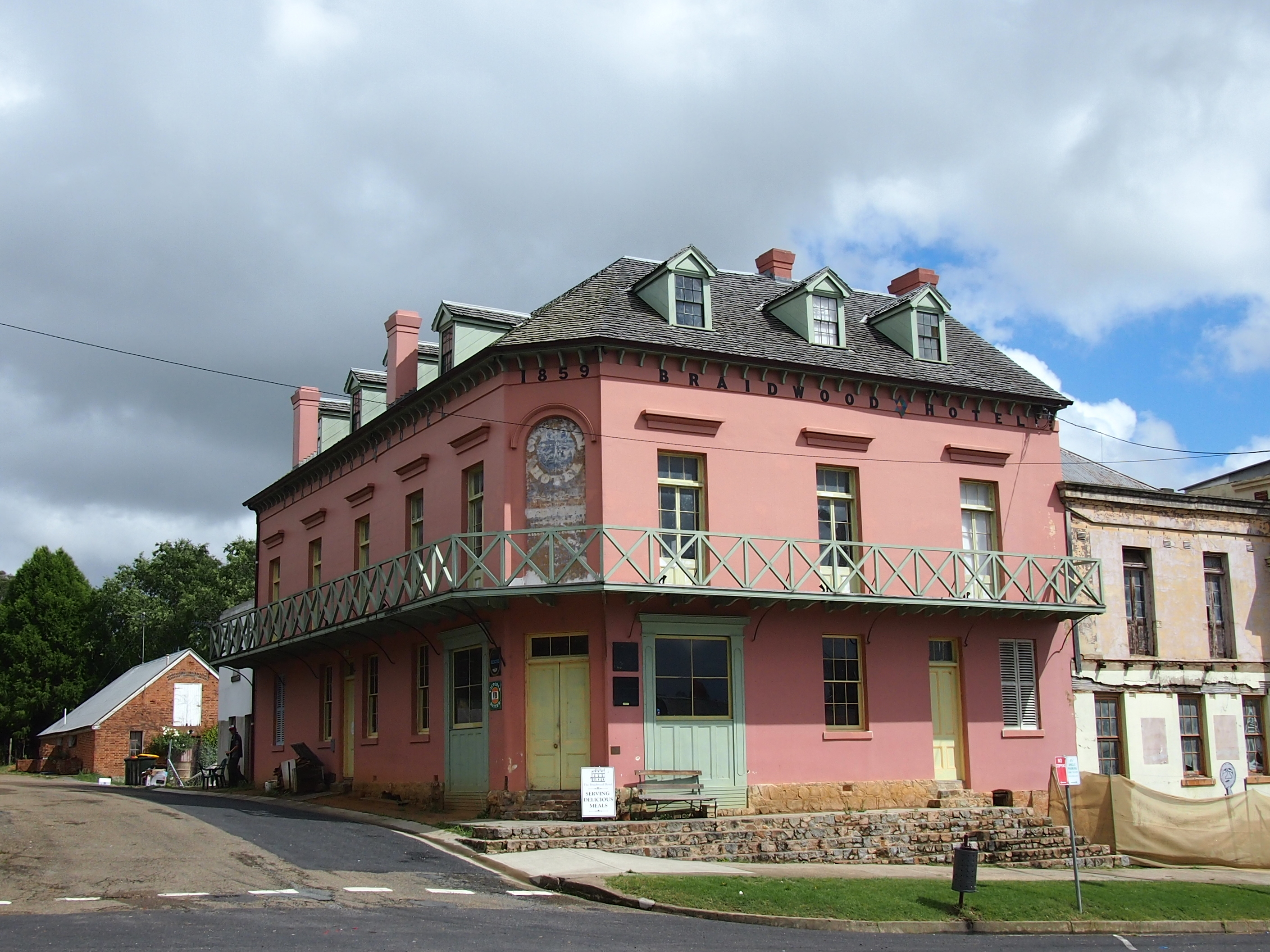
The Braidwood Hotel, which was established in 1859

Several buildings were erected c. 1840/41, including the first Doncaster Inn (1841–1907). The economic depression of the early 1840s slowed development for a few years but gradually a business centre developed along Mackellar Street adjacent to Monkittee Creek and on the north-facing slope of Wallace Street. Proximity to creek water was obviously an incentive to spread along Mackellar Street as was, apparently, the disincentive of ascending the "Jew's Hill" (Benjamin Moses is shown as the owner of the block on the south east corner of Mackellar and Wallace streets). Surveyor Larmer purchased land and built the Royal Hotel c. 1845 (the present Museum). In Mackellar Street the three-storeyed Albert Buildings, later converted to a steam-driven flourmill, were used as shops by Hendricks and Jacobs ( still standing). On the corner of Mackellar and Wallace Streets was the Post Office and store (still standing). A District Council had been established in 1843.

The first steam mill was erected in 1846 at the junction of Monkittee Creek and Mona Creek near the site of Dr Wilson's first house at Braidwood Farm (the footings are still evident).

The population grew from 1100 in the 1841 census to a total of 1429 in the Braidwood Police District in 1851, 212 of who lived in the town. With the discovery of gold in Araluen in mid 1851, and throughout the region soon after, Braidwood's role as the primary town in the district strengthened. Braidwood's business centre eventually crept over the hill and to the south end of Wallace Street following the survey of the road to Nelligen, and the continuing business from the goldfields to the south.

Braidwood's "National School" was opened in 1849 in Wilson Street opposite the present site. The government granted part of the present site in 1851 and a permanent building was finished in 1852. A brewery was opened in 1851 along with numerous other businesses and small industries. The Joint Stock Bank was built 1855 in response to the gold boom, with others following. By 1857 there were three tanning factories in the town. The 1856 census shows 3045 people in Braidwood police district and in 1861 there were 959 people in the town and 8199 in the surrounding goldfields. The town's population climbed to 1197 by 1871.

A small brick Anglican Church and rectory was erected in Wilson Street in 1856. A larger church in Elrington St was dedicated in 1892 and the tower finally added 1899, all from granite quarried on Wilson's Hill and Mt Gillamatong. One third of the local population was Catholic and by 1865 St Bedes was completed. The Wesleyan Church in Duncan Street was built 1856 and the Presbyterian Church erected in 1861 on the corner of Duncan and Monkittee.

The Commercial Hotel, which is currently being restored by John Mitchell, was built in 1859. In 1866 there were eleven other hotels in Braidwood besides the Doncaster, the Royal and the Commercial. The Court House Hotel still stands as a two-storey brick building in Wallace Street as does the Gold Diggers Home, which became Nomchong's hardware and now a bottle shop diagonally opposite St Bedes. Nomchong, who came from China to the goldfields, moved from Mongarlowe to Braidwood in 1879 and his family became well known locally. In the late 1860s, 1870s and 80s, many of the less substantial buildings were demolished and brick and granite structures took their place.

In 1861 a substantial two-storey gaol and gaoler's residence was erected at northern end of Wallace Street where the barracks for the mounted police had been built 25 years earlier. By 1862 the old mounted police barracks were uninhabitable. The building was repaired to provide extra accommodation for the increased number of police who were sent to the district to control bushranging activity. Repairs and extensions were also made to the courthouse. In 1866 Colonial Architect James Barnet visited Braidwood to review the public buildings. A brick police barracks and stables was constructed next to the courthouse in 1865 and is still in use today. The telegraph station (the current postmaster residence) was constructed in 1864. In 1869 post and telegraph services were merged and the post office moved to its present location, which was preferred, as it was more central to the town.

A reservoir had been formed by the construction of a causeway on Monkittee Creek where the road entered the township to provide water.

By 1885 the transition of the main business district over the hill to the southern slope of Wallace Street was complete. Shortly after, the present Royal Hotel was erected, as were some adjacent two-storey shops (all still standing). The town had been optimistic in the 1870s and 80s that it would be connected to the rail and, rather hopefully, named a street on the northern edge of town Station Street, and constructed the Railway Hotel where Wallace Street crosses Monkittee Creek. However, the golden years were over, and drought and depression struck in the 1890s with a series of droughts from 1895 to 1911. Construction in Braidwood's business area virtually ceased.

=== After 1900 ===
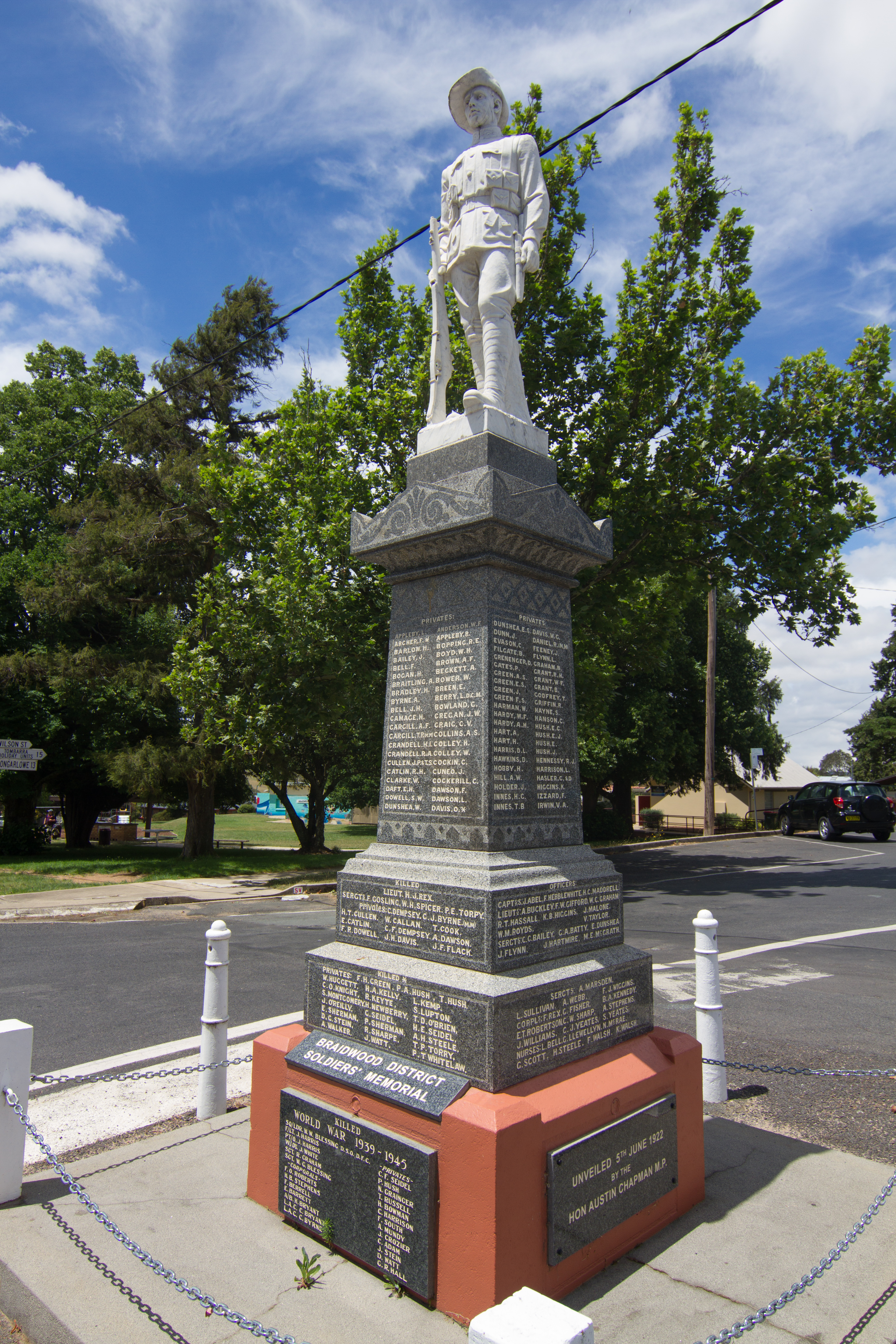
The Braidwood District Soldiers' Memorial

The first car entered the town in 1903. In 1913 Ryrie Park, which was known as Market Square in 1866, was leased for grazing and, as a result, stock damaged the trees and fences. In 1925 the Municipal Council organised the Back to Braidwood Celebrations commemorating 100 years of European Settlement, which was made the occasion of cleaning up and beautifying Ryrie Park. School children collected rubbish, the Forestry Department and the Botanic Gardens donated trees and shrubs.

In 1928 the Linwood Lighting Company commenced building a generating plant on the Corner of Wallace and Solus streets. A solid concrete basement was constructed to house a freezing works and ice making factory that would carry the water tanks above to provide steam for the generator, however the company collapsed in the depths of the depression in 1931. Eventually electric lighting of the main street was connected in Feb 1936. Braidwood was connected to the state grid in 1957. Reticulated water was available in 1955, but a sewerage system not installed until 1966.

Braidwood's population peaked in 1901. By the 1920s growth in the town had stagnated with a minor depression in 1920–21. This was followed by the great depression commencing in 1929, and a severe drought with a grasshopper plague in 1931. A rabbit freezing works was located in Duncan St. The trough of depression had passed by 1936 when the avenue of Lombardy and Golden poplars was planted at the northern entrance to town to celebrate the 25th year of King George V's reign. Braidwood Country Women's Association also dates from c. 1936 as does the amalgamation of the Municipality of Braidwood (9 sq. miles established in 1891) and the Tallaganda Shire (gazetted 1906).

The 1950s saw economic growth with the post WWII population increase and the mid-1950s wool boom, when wool was a "pound (£) a pound (lb)". The north, east and south of the town was still "landlocked" by the pastoralists and so the town followed earlier growth to the western side. The extension of Duncan Street was patriotically named Coronation Street and the RSL Club built at its end in 1954. The swimming pool, one of the few civic structures dating from the 20th century, was opened in 1965.

== Description ==
The heritage listing includes the township of Braidwood bounded by the historic 1839 town plan, together with surrounding landscape areas essential to the retention and appreciation of its significance.

The integrity of Braidwood's town plan is evident in comparative analysis with other regional town's including Bungendore, Queanbeyan, Gundaroo, Goulburn, Berrima and Yass all of which either never consolidated their 19th century built form, or lost their integrity as a result of extensive 20th century development. In several cases the town plans have been split by road and rail. While some towns beyond the region retain high integrity, e.g. Grenfell, they post-date Braidwood by several decades, and do not demonstrate Georgian grid planning to the same degree.

== Heritage listing ==
Braidwood and its setting are of state significance as an excellent surviving example of a Georgian period town plan, dating from the late 1830s. The plan, which retains high integrity, reflects colonial administration as applied to the outer reaches of the Nineteen Counties from the 1820s, following earliest European settlement in the area. The surviving historic elements in the surrounding landscape strengthen the town's significance.

The town buildings reflect key phases of development, commencing with the initial construction period in the 1840s, and consolidation in the later half of the century following the gold boom. The integrity of Wallace Street as a fine collection of 19th century buildings makes it particularly significant. The high proportion of 19th century buildings throughout the town contributes further to its heritage value and creates fine streetscapes often with delightful views to the pastoral surrounds.

The abrupt transition at the town boundary between built and pastoral landscapes highlights significant historical settlement patterns, specifically the large land grants on the north, east and south sides of the town obtained by McKellar, Wilson and Coghill, and passed on to the Maddrells and eventually others. The juxtaposition of a cohesive town set within an historic pastoral landscape on the north, east and south sides is also significant. The closer settlement on the western side reflects the subdivision of the former Church and School Estate.

In NSW, colonial towns that retain significant historic form and fabric to the extent that Braidwood does, are rare.

Some 20th century elements in the town reflect later phases of development. Construction c. 1936 is significant for its association with the emergence from the Great Depression and amalgamation of the Municipality of Braidwood with the Tallaganda Shire. Development in the 1950s, particularly to the west of town is significant for its association with post WWII population growth and the mid-1950s wool boom. 20th century development is reflected in most towns in NSW and, in the context of Braidwood, is considered to be of local significance only.

Braidwood and Its Setting was listed on the New South Wales State Heritage Register on 3 April 2006 with amidst local opposition and little consultation. Financial support failed to accompany the Heritage Act to help with ongoing maintenance or renovations which require heritage architects. The Act includes a possibler six month imprisonment for homeowners who fail to abide by the terms of the Act.

having satisfied the following criteria.

The place is important in demonstrating the course, or pattern, of cultural or natural history in New South Wales.

Braidwood is a coherent and well preserved 19th century township set within a rolling pastoral landscape. The town, which dates from 1839, is historically linked to the first European settlement of the area in the 1820s through the influence of land grants, surveying practice, settlement ideals, convictism, civil and judicial administration and the strength of character of the early settlers. Located in the southernmost of the nineteen counties, the town emerged as the centre of the Braidwood Police District by the 1840s.

The Georgian town-plan remains large intact, as do a significant number of early buildings. The fine collection of pre 1850s buildings north of Wilson Street attest to the town's focus towards the north during its first decade. The mid to late Victorian buildings south of Wilson Street reflect the impact of the gold discoveries from 1851.

The views to and from the surrounding pastoral landscape and road approaches to the north, east and south of the township are integral to the conservation and appreciation of its significance.

The initial land grant to the Church and School Estate, combined with the pastoral holdings of Mackellar, Wilson, Coghill and Maddrell created a distinctive land tenure pattern that remains clearly legible in terms of property subdivision, rural housing density, vegetation patterns, boundary fence divisions and road patterns.

The place has a strong or special association with a person, or group of persons, of importance of cultural or natural history of New South Wales's history.

Thomas Braidwood Wilson, after whom the town is named, was one of the first people to be granted land in the area. It was from his selection that the village reserve was resumed and the width of his property defined the town's length. Wilson was also responsible for recommending a reserve be set aside, that eventually became Ryrie Park. A cottage from Wilson's original homestead still remains at Ardstrath.

Regional surveyor James Larmer retired to Braidwood and constructed a hotel at the northern end of Wallace Street that is still standing. Within the town are several particularly attractive streetscapes, including the Wallace Street vista up Jew's Hill, the Wallace Street vistas north and south, some of the side streets, in particular those that retain soft edging to their roadside verge, period buildings and attractive landscaping.

A number of streetscapes frame vistas to the pastoral landscape beyond and this combination of historic streetscape in the foreground with pastoral landscape in the distance, particularly where this transition is abrupt, has been recognised in earlier studies as having high aesthetic value.

Aesthetic views of the town include: the approach from Canberra, where the town is framed by a row of Poplars; the view from Thomas Braidwood Wilson's grave; the approach to the town on the Mongarlowe Rd from approximately "Mona Homestead"; the view from the Araluen Rd as it approaches the town, and the view from Mt Gillamatong.

Some individual buildings in the town have aesthetic value, and images from the town that draw on the aesthetic values have appeared in a number of books, and have been used as the backdrop to several films.

The place is important in demonstrating aesthetic characteristics and/or a high degree of creative or technical achievement in New South Wales.

Within the town are several particularly attractive streetscapes, including the Wallace Street vista up Jew's Hill, the Wallace Street vistas north and south, some of the side streets, in particular those that retain soft edging to their roadside verge, period buildings and attractive landscaping.

A number of streetscapes frame vistas to the pastoral landscape beyond and this combination of historic streetscape in the foreground with pastoral landscape in the distance, particularly where this transition is abrupt, has been recognised in earlier studies as having high aesthetic value.

Aesthetic views of the town include: the approach from Canberra, where the town is framed by a row of Poplars; the view from Thomas Braidwood Wilson's grave; the approach to the town on the Mongarlowe Rd from approximately "Mona Homestead"; the view from the Araluen Rd as it approaches the town, and the view from Mt Gillamatong.

Some individual buildings in the town have aesthetic value, and images from the town that draw on the aesthetic values have appeared in a number of books, and have been used as the backdrop to several films.

The place has strong or special association with a particular community or cultural group in New South Wales for social, cultural or spiritual reasons.

Although not formally surveyed, it is assumed that there are strong social and community values held by various communities. It is reasonable to assume that these could include churches, the RSL/golf club, the cemetery, Mt Gillamatong, Dr Wilson's grave and the historic and aesthetic ambience and character of the town

The place has potential to yield information that will contribute to an understanding of the cultural or natural history of New South Wales.

Because of Braidwood's integrity, setting and its evolution since European arrival, the area has considerable potential to assist an understanding of NSW's cultural history. The interplay between society, the individual and place since the early colonial period, can be discerned in the Braidwood landscape today. From early 19th century attitudes to health and well-being, as exemplified by Dr Thomas Braidwood Wilson (Surgeon Superintendent with the Royal Navy) to the role and deployment of mounted police in the colony, the evolution of town planning or the impact of drought on mid 19th century rural growth (for example), Braidwood and setting provides an excellent field for study.

Dennis Jeans discusses early settlement in his book Historical Geography of NSW and comments: the interaction of expanding enterprise with diverse environments and the problem of distance created a complex regional geography which influenced the form of the advancing frontiers long after 1830. In this period also the essential elements of an officially determined cultural landscape were beginning to form. Braidwood and setting provide an excellent example of Jeans' officially determined cultural landscape and may well prove a valuable benchmark for historical, geographical and other analysis.

The place possesses uncommon, rare or endangered aspects of the cultural or natural history of New South Wales.

Few towns from within the 19 counties retain the density of 19th century features found in Braidwood and its setting. Settlement within the Limits of Location benefited from the attention of the colonial administration through survey, town planning, police administration etc. Through the 19th century much of its immediate rural landscape was effectively "locked up" from subdivision, however its urban form was substantially reinforced by the local gold boom. Its distance from major transport networks and urban centres coupled with droughts and depression resulted in limited growth in the 20th century. As a town that displays a wealth of intact 19th century features, Braidwood stands out in comparison with most other regional centres.

The place is important in demonstrating the principal characteristics of a class of cultural or natural places/environments in New South Wales.

Braidwood is an excellent example of a 19th-century rural town plan. The rectangular Georgian plan of 1839 sits well in its landscape and has not been split by subsequent rail or road realignments, or overlaid by more recent planning models or block amalgamations. It reflects a range of key planning determinants of the day including Governor Darling's approach to order, layout and block and road dimensions. The plan also reflects the importance of the judiciary and police system by inclusion of a substantial area for police horse paddocks, as befitted the centre of a police district. The evidence of the town's perimeter, and the abrupt transition between the town and surrounding pastoral area reinforces its significance.
