= William Sandys Elrington =

Early colonial settler in Australia

Major William Sandys Elrington (1780–1860) was a British military officer, veteran of the Peninsula War, and colonial settler of New South Wales, Australia. He is associated with the locality of Farringdon and the village of Majors Creek, both near Braidwood.

== Family background, early life and military career ==
Elrington was born in Devon. He was the eighth child of Captain Thomas Elrington (1722—1809), at the time of Elrington's birth commander of a company of the Corps of Invalids at the Royal Citadel at Plymouth, and his wife Rebecca (1742—1823) née Goodall.

Elrington came from a long line of soldiers, and was descended—at least, so he believed—from William the Conqueror. His father had fought in both the suppression of the Jacobite rising of 1745, at Culloden, and in the Seven Years War in North America. Before and after his father's time at Plymouth, Elrington's family lived at Low Hill House, at White Ladies Aston, Worcestershire. His father was buried at the local church, St John the Baptist, as are two other military relatives, his brother Major-General Richard Goodall Elrington (1776—1845), and his brother-in-law, married to his sister Ellzabeth Mary, Major-General John Montresor Pilcher.

Elrington followed his family's tradition of employment and joined the army in 1795, taking a commission in a regiment raised for the West Indies. He had a 29-year military career, including service in the Peninsula War (from August 1809 to January 1813) with the 11th Regiment of Foot. before selling his commission, in 1826, and migrating to Australia.

== New South Wales ==
=== Migration ===
Elrington left Plymouth, in November 1826, and arrived in Sydney aboard Elizabeth, in April 1827, with his second son, Richard, and a much older woman, Mary Smith, who acted as their housekeeper. Early settlers would remember Elrington as a tall, red-headed, blue-eyed man, of soldierly bearing, carrying a scar on his forehead from being slashed with a sabre.

He had migrated to New South Wales during the administration of Governor Ralph Darling. Darling had been appointed with the objective of restoring discipline to the penal colony, after what was seen by the British government of the time as the relatively lax rule of Governor Macquarie and Governor Brisbane. Darling tended to rely upon like-minded military men to staff his administration, and he favoured many such men with grants of land.

Before Elrington had left England, he already had a land grant in New South Wales. He was appointed as a magistrate in 1828. In 1830, he was one of a number of prominent colonists, who were appointed as justices-of-the-peace, by Governor Darling.

=== Mount Elrington and other landholdings ===
After settler colonisation, the area now known as Farringdon lay within the Nineteen Counties that were open to settlement. Elrington took up his land grant of 2560 acres there, which became known as 'Mount Elrington', in 1827. His new estate lay, in the upper part of the valley of the Shoalhaven River, on a left-bank tributary now known as Mount Creek. Early settlers said that the native name for the area was Jingro, Jinero, or Jineroo. It lay on the traditional lands of the Walbanga people, a group of the Yuin, from whom it was taken by the land grant. In its early years, Mount Elrington was the location of an annual distribution of government blankets to the surviving Aboriginal people.

Mount Elrington was one of the earliest colonial settlements, in the area south of what would later, in 1839, become the town of Braidwood, Three other early settlers—Duncan Mackellar, John Coghill, and Thomas Braidwood Wilson—also took up land around Braidwood.

By 1828, using convict labour, he had cleared 500 acres of land and the estate was soon self-sufficient. Around 600 acres of the land was rich, alluvial, river-flat country, much of which may not have needed significant clearing. Although at the time the land was remote, it was arable and well-watered.

In 1829, William Tarlington (1804—1893), with three Aboriginal guides, starting at Braidwood, followed the rivers into the Bega Valley, where he found good land and later settled as a squatter at Cobargo. Like other Braidwood landholders, Elrington took up two blocks there, as a squatter, in the early 1830s, but he did not settle there.

Unlike a number of other landholders in the Braidwood district, Elrington does not appear to have been a supporter or financial backer of The Wool Road, to Jervis Bay. In fact, around the same time, in 1842, he seems to have been involved in raising subscription funding for a rival private road, from Bellalaba to the port of Broulee. Such a road would have connected Mount Elrington to a seaport on the coast. The road was have followed part of a cart route blazed by Charles Nicholson, from Broulee to the Monaro, in 1841.

By August 1844, then 64 years old and seeking to retire, Elrington was trying to sell his land. By then, his landholding consisted of three large pieces of land; 'Mount Elrington' (2560 acres), 'Smithleagh' (1865 acres, on two titles of 1220 and 645 acres, its northern boundary adjoining Mount Elrington, and its eastern boundary being the Shoalhaven River) and 'Stork' (2560 acres, four miles east of 'Smithleagh'.) The names of the latter two properties, are significant; it is almost certain that 'Smithleagh' was named for Mary Smith—whose name seems to have been on its two title deeds, as purchaser— and the oddly-named 'Stork' refers to the heraldic animal on the Elrington family coat of arms. There were also a large number of horses, sheep and cattle, some grazing on other land, as far away as the Monaro. By that time, Elrington was breeding fine horses. It appears that Elrington's land came with some pre-emptive rights, to adjoining government land, and that the total landholding was around 9300 acres. Although he may have used land around what is now Majors Creek for grazing, he seems not to have had title over that area.

His home at Mount Elrington was described as, "a substantial ten-roomed verandah dwelling, with stone store, and kitchen, a garden of six acres, well stocked with the choicest fruit trees, and vegetables, stables, cart sheds, sheep shed, forge, men's huts, saw pits, &c."

=== Colonial magistrate ===
In May 1828, Elrington was appointed as a magistrate, joining Captain John Coghill and, slightly later, Captain Duncan Mackellar, as the local Police Magistrates. All were local land-owners, using assigned convict labour. In 1838, he would be joined, by a newly-appointed magistrate for the Braidwood district, another ex-military man and landowner, Lieutenant Colonel John Mackenzie of Nerriga. Mercifully, each magistrate was prohibited from trying their own assigned convicts, and for more serious offences were required to adjudicate in pairs.

When the liberal-minded Richard Bourke replaced Ralph Darling as Governor in late 1831, he was horrified at the severity and arbitrary application of punishments being given to convicts. In August 1832, he had passed the Offenders Punishment and Summary Jurisdiction Act, which for the first time both codified and limited the penalties that could be imposed on convicts. There was resistance from existing magistrates, but the reforms were implemented, and improved, if only relatively, the treatment of convicts.

As might be expected from a martinet like Elrington, he was an advocate of summary punishment and greater powers for single magistrates. Hearings were held at his home at Mount Elrington, which given the absence of a nearby town, at the time, was more reasonable than it first might appear. A constable was stationed at Mount Elrington.

Local lore has it that two gum trees, on the Shoalhaven River near Mount Elrington, which were cut down in the 1920s, had been used as makeshift gallows, and hangings were carried out there. This local legend seems unlikely, as magistrates could not impose the death sentence, although they certainly could, and did, impose penalties involving flogging or imprisonment. It is said that, locally, Elrington was known as 'the flogging Major'.

Remoteness from large towns with prisons had consequences. One particularly egregious case was that of a fifteen year old, free-born, orphaned servant girl, Martha Emily Cadman. She had been sentenced by Elrington to three months, in 1836, 'for improper conduct in her hired service', an offence under the draconian Masters and Servants Act (1828). Subsequently, she was raped by one of the ex-convict constables escorting her, during the 200 mile journey made on foot, to the 'House of Correction'. Instead of being allowed, as planned, to stay overnight at an inn at Sutton Forest, she had been made to share a hut with the men, where the rape occurred. The constable, Patrick Brady, and another constable, George Nutter—as an accomplice—were found guilty of rape and sentenced to death, but then the judge ruled that 'in consequence of inquiries he had made respecting the character of the female, their punishment would be commuted'. Despite her personal courage in reporting the offence and later giving evidence, it did not end well for Martha; her reputation had been besmirched publicly by the judge, and, reportedly, she was later the 'kept mistress' of one of the jurors at Brady's trial. By 1845, she was drinking heavily and apparently living as a prostitute. Even at the time, these appalling outcomes were seen as consequences of Elrington's harsh sentencing of Martha, for running away from her employer, who she said had ill used her, and remaining at large for just two days. She had run away, after her employer—Henry Clay Burnell (1806 - 1888), the first settler at Araluen in 1831—and his wife Sarah, née Gray) had forcibly cut off her hair, a punishment of humiliation inflicted upon female convicts for 'vile offences'.

Elrington resigned as a magistrate, unexpectedly, around May 1839. He did not comment publicly on the reason for his sudden resignation, other than to say it was "influenced by the purest of motives." It seems that the cause was a disagreement with Governor Gipps. Elrington had refused to endorse the ticket-of-leave application of one of his former convict stockmen, Patrick Neill, whom he suspected was a cattle thief, but Gipps granted the ticket-of-leave. His resignation can be viewed in the broader context of the disagreement over the future course of the colony, between the reforming governor—preparing the colony for an end to transportation and for self-government—and those opposed to reform—the reactionary faction of landholders known as 'the Exclusives', who relied upon assigned convict labour for their low-cost workforce, and the squatters, who would later form the Pastoral Association of New South Wales.

=== Convict servants ===
As part of the convict system, male and female convicts were assigned to landowners, as labourers, stockmen, gardeners, shepherds, servants, or people with trades of various kinds. By 1841, there were 59 people living at Mount Elrington, the majority of whom were assigned convicts. It is reported that at dinner time, Elrington sat at one end of the table and at the other, his son, Richard, each with a loaded pistol, and that no convict servant was allowed to walk behind either of them. Recalcitrant convicts were kept in a small prison at Mount Elrington.

The estate was near the frontier of 'legal' colonial settlement, and conditions were harsh. Assigned convicts sometimes took their chance to abscond from Mount Elrington. One convict of African descent, named Moses, was said to have managed to stay at large for several weeks, by living on raw potatoes, turnips, and corn stolen from the estate's fields at night. Found living, in a cavity in the river bank, only a quarter of a mile from the estate, gaunt and famished, Moses returned willingly, such was his condition. The penalty for an absconding male convict was a flogging, up to 50 lashes. Repeat offences could result in a sentence to work, in leg irons, on a government road gang. Escape from a road gang brought more severe punishment, up to 100 lashes.

One of Elrington's assigned convicts, John Hare, had absconded twice and was about to be punished with 100 lashes, at Bathurst, when he broke away and attacked Elrington. Hare brought two large stones down on Elrington's head, while shouting that he would take Elrington's life. Although he survived the attack, he was confined for than a month to recover. The head wound had a lasting impact on Elrington, who reported frequent giddiness and nervousness. In February 1836, charged with attempted murder, Hare was found guilty, by a jury, of the lesser offence of assault with intent to do some grievous bodily harm. It was for this offence that Hare was sentenced to death, in late February, and was executed by hanging on 4 March 1836.

Eventually, with the cessation of convict transportation in 1840 and the end of the assignment of new convicts to private service on 21 July 1841—which created a shortage of new low-cost labour— the economic basis of estates like Mount Elrington began to change gradually, from an excess of compelled, unpaid labour to free, paid labour.

=== Employed servants ===
Not all of the servants at Mount Elrington were assigned convicts. Some were free immigrant settlers and others were ex-convicts who had served their full sentences or were on tickets-of-leave. Nonetheless, the conditions for employed servants at Mount Elrington estate were primitive; notably, there was no school for their children. The outcomes for these employed servants and their children were varied.

Mary Connell lived at Mount Elrington for a time; her parents were free immigrant servants employed by Elrington. She married John Clarke, an ex-convict shoemaker at Mount Elington. They later became the parents of the notorious bushrangers and vicious killers, the Clarke brothers. John Clarke died in Goulburn Gaol, in 1866, while awaiting trial for murder, while his sons, Thomas and John, were hanged in 1867. Mary's brothers Pat and Tom Connell also became bushrangers and, with their nephews and brother-in-law, part of what was a criminal extended family. The outrages committed by the Clarke gang, at least in part, motivated Henry Parkes to introduce state-funded public schools to the Braidwood district, as "the means of instructing the young so they shall form an honest and intelligent generation".

The Clarke brothers' first cousin was Patrick Joseph Hoshie Farrell (1863—1956), but the story of his life was very different. He was born at Braidwood and he was one of the first cohort that would all attend school. His father, Thomas Farrell (1811—1901), was an ex-convict carpenter at Mount Elrington, when he married Mary Connell's younger sister, Ellen (c.1824—1902), in 1841. Thomas and Ellen later moved to Braidwood, where they stayed away from crime and where Thomas used his carpenter's skills as a builder and as an undertaker. Their son, Patrick Farrell, went to America and became a surgeon, rising to the rank of Brigadier General in the US Army. He was cited for gallantry at the Battle of Manila (1898), and also served in the First World War. In turn, Patrick Farrell's son, Walter Greatsinger Farrell (1897—1990), was a veteran of both World Wars, won a Silver Star, and reached the rank of Major General in the US Marine Corps.

== Family, later life, and death ==
By the time that he came to Australia, Elrington's wife, Elizabeth (née Caines), about whom little is known with certainty, was already dead. It is probable that Elizabeth was either a daughter or other relative of Clement Caines, owner of a sugar plantation worked by enslaved people, on what was then known as St Christopher Island in the West Indies. Caines was a prominent supporter of the policy known as 'amelioration.' Elrington had been stationed in the West Indies, during the early part of his military career.

Elrington had two sons, Clement Caines Elrington (born c.1807) and Richard Goodall Elrington (1814—1870), both graduates of Cambridge. Richard—who had exactly the same name as his father's elder brother—came to Australia with his father and a much older woman, Mary Smith, thought to be William's old nanny, who acted as a housekeeper. Mary seems to have been the widow of a sergeant of Elrington's father's invalid company. It is said that she called Elrington, 'the boy', and Richard, 'the young boy'. Judging by his age, it seems that Richard may have returned to England for a period to complete his studies. It seems that he refused to follow a military career, and that this was a source of enmity for his father.

Richard, who was headstrong, much like his father, wanted to marry Louisa Clarke (1810—1893), the sister of Dr George Clarke, medical practitioner, of Penrith, and later the aunt of a colonial jurist, Sir Fielding Clarke. Although Louisa was a highly-educated, beautiful, young woman, Elrington objected to the marriage—Louisa was the daughter of a London merchant and thus 'in trade'—and would not consent to it. The couple eloped, marrying at Campbelltown, in 1838, and living for a time in Sydney, where Richard worked as a tutor and Louisa as a governess. Elrington responded by disinheriting Richard.

The imminent birth of a grandchild restored relations between Elrington and his son. Richard and heavily-pregnant Lousa returned to live at Mount Elrington. A granddaughter, Catherine Charlotte Elrlngton, was born there, in 1839, followed by a grandson, Hamilton Pope Elrington, in 1841. Elrington became reconciled to his son's marriage, and very fond of Louisa and the children.

The harmony did not last. A quarrel over the management of the estate, resulted in harsh words and in father and son shaping to fight a duel. At the last moment, Elrington threw down his pistol and apologised to his son. However, Richard had reached the end of his relationship with his overbearing father; he left Mount Elrington, immediately thereafter, with his wife and two children, ignoring the pleas of his then remorseful father.

Richard's family's departure from Mount Elrington seems to have occurred before or around early November 1843. Apparently now estranged from Elrington, they were living in Sydney by 1845 and, in the same year, Mary Smith died and was buried at Mount Elrington.

After weathering the economic depression of the early 1840, which ruined many of his fellow settler landowners, he sold Mount Elrington to Charles Nicholson in 1845. Elrington left Australia, for good, in February 1846. He lived thereafter on a £300 annuity that was a condition of the sale contract for his land. He died, at his home in Southsea, Hampshire, on 4 May 1860.

Richard Elrington, discovered his vocation as an actor, particularly of Shakespeare's plays, and remained in Australia. He was ready well-known as an actor, by March 1846, at the Royal Victoria Theatre, in Sydney. He first performed in Melbourne, at the Queen's Theatre, around December 1846. He was performing in Victoria, and living there with his family, in 1847. Louisa, making use of her education and talents, taught for a living, as did Richard at times. Richard died at Ararat, in 1870, and Louisa, in 1893, at Laverton.

The other Richard Goodall Elrington (1776—1845), William Sandys Elrington's elder brother, was a lifelong soldier who fought in many of Britain's wars and, despite a court-martial in 1831-1832, reached the rank of Major-General.

Clement, Elrington's elder son, came to Australia in 1835, as a Lieutenant of the 4th Regiment of Foot, escorting convicts. He had only recently joined that regiment which was bound for New South Wales, and possibly only did so to make the journey with a source of income. Once in New South Wales, in 1836, he sold his commission and retired from the army. Presumably, he joined his father and brother, Richard, at Mount Elrington. In 1840, he bought 640 acres of land—at a lower cost, as a result of his recent military service—far from Mount Elrington, near Maitland, in the Hunter Valley. However, he was very different in temperament to both his father and his younger brother, Richard. He sold the land for a quick profit, in 1841, and he is now mainly remembered as a very minor poet. In June 1856, a man of his name was a passenger, from Hobart to Melbourne, aboard Emma Prescott. His father's will reduced Clement's inheritance by £82, on account of expenses met by his father from 1857; it seems that he was impecunious and living in England around the time of his father's death. Although Clement had owned the land in the Hunter Valley only briefly, his name remained associated with it. His former land was later a part of the vast South Maitland coalfields, and the Elrington Colliery and the locality of Elrington, near Cessnock, are named after him.

== Legacy ==
Elrington is remembered by the name of Elrington Street, in Braidwood, most street names of which are taken from those of early settlers of the surrounding region.

South of Braidwood, a settlement officially known as Elrington came into being, around 1840. From the time of the first gold mining, around 1851, it was better known as Majors Creek, but still was at least officially, Elrington. Both these names stem from Major William Sandys Elrington. Majors Creek's sole commercial business, its hotel and post office agency, is still known as the Elrington Hotel. The cadestral area containing the town of Majors Creek is known as the Parish of Elrington.

His former home, still known as 'Mount Elrington', is renowned for the remnants of its historic garden. The garden was begun by Elrington, who brought many of the trees and shrubs from England. His old home retained its small prison, complete with leg irons, until the early 1920s. The old house still stands, in somewhat modified condition, on Mount Elrington Road, but the locality—once Mount Elrington—is now known as Farringdon.

During the late 1920s, Elrington's great-granddaughter, Eleanor Anne Ogilvy, wrote a screenplay, 'The Martinet', about the life and times of Elrington and her grandparents, Richard Elrington and Louisa Clarke. The plot is loosely aligned with the family historical narrative that she wrote as a newspaper article, in 1923. In the screenplay, she disguised the Elrington family, probably in deference to her Elrington relatives—Richard Elrington's son, Hamilton, was still alive at the time—by making the characters' surnames 'Sandys'—Elrington's middle name—although other historical characters, such as the Clarke family, retained their actual names. She also admitted that she deviated from the historical narrative in the character of 'Lieutenant Sandys', the elder son, and there are some differences from the sequence of actual events. Copyright over the screenplay was granted, in 1930, and a copy of the screenplay is held in the National Archives of Australia, but It seems that the film was never made.
