= Clarke gang =

Australian bushrangers

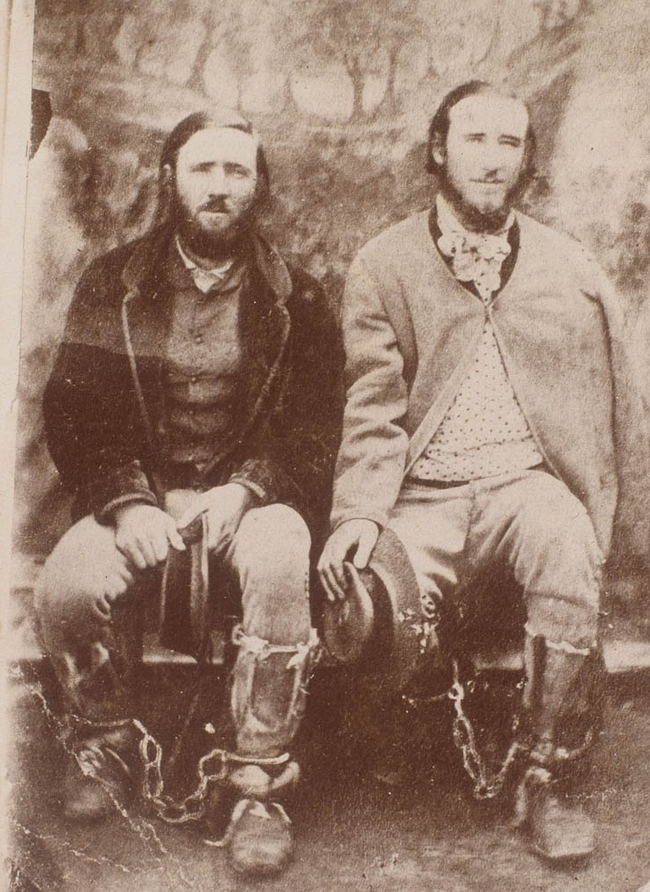
John and Thomas Clarke in Braidwood Gaol, May 1867. Thomas (right) is shot in the arm.

The Clarke gang was a group of bushrangers active in the mid-1860s in the southern goldfields of New South Wales, Australia. The membership of the gang fluctuated over time, the two core members being brothers Thomas and John Clarke, from the Braidwood district.

The Clarke brothers, along with several relatives and associates, were responsible for a reported 71 robberies and hold-ups, as well as the death of at least one policeman. They are also the primary suspects in the killing of a squad of four policemen sent to capture them and shot several others, four of whom died from their wounds, including one gang member and a man whom they erroneously thought to be a police tracker. Their crimes formed part of a bushranging epidemic that inspired the Government of New South Wales to enact the Felons' Apprehension Act (1866), a law that introduced the concept of outlawry in the colony and authorised citizens to kill bushrangers on sight. Thomas was proclaimed an outlaw on 31 May 1866.

By the end of 1866, most members of the gang had either been captured and imprisoned or killed in shootouts with the police. John and Thomas were captured following a shootout in April 1867. They were hanged two months later at Darlinghurst Gaol, Sydney. Their executions marked the end of the last major outbreak of organised gang bushranging in New South Wales.

Some modern-day writers have described the Clarkes as the most bloodthirsty bushrangers of all, and according to one journalist, "Their crimes were so shocking that they never made their way into bushranger folklore — people just wanted to forget about them."

== Bushranging and murders ==
The Clarkes' father Jack, a shoemaker transported to Sydney in 1828 for seven years aboard the Morley, arrived in the Braidwood district as a convict assigned to a pastoralist. By then an ex-convict, he married Mary Connell—at 'Mount Elrington', where he was working and her parents were free immigrant servants—and took up a leasehold in the Jingeras, which proved too small to support his family of five children. He took to selling sly-grog (illegal alcohol), initiated his sons Tom and John into cattle duffing (cattle rustling) and raised them to believe in his view of the fair and equitable distribution of property. They constantly raided crops and livestock, aided by their uncles Pat and Tom Connell. Their gang, the Jerrabat Gully Rakers, were regarded as scientists in the art of cattle duffing and horse stealing. The Clarke gang of relatives and friends were well trained in bushcraft and heavily armed.

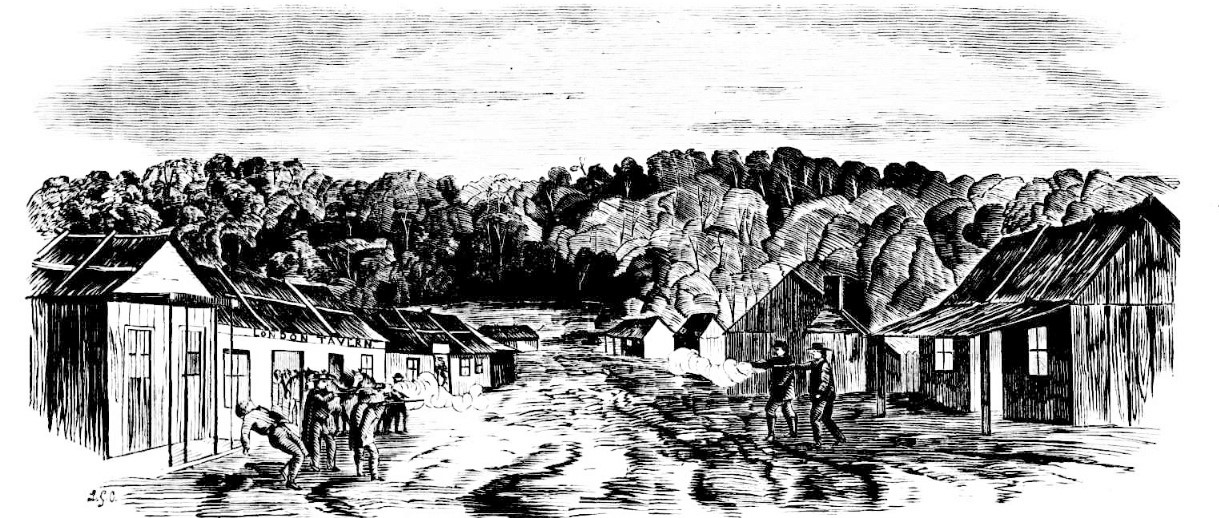
Contemporary sketch of Constables O'Grady and Smythe repulsing the Clarke gang at Nerrigundah, 9 April 1866. O'Grady has just shot Fletcher.

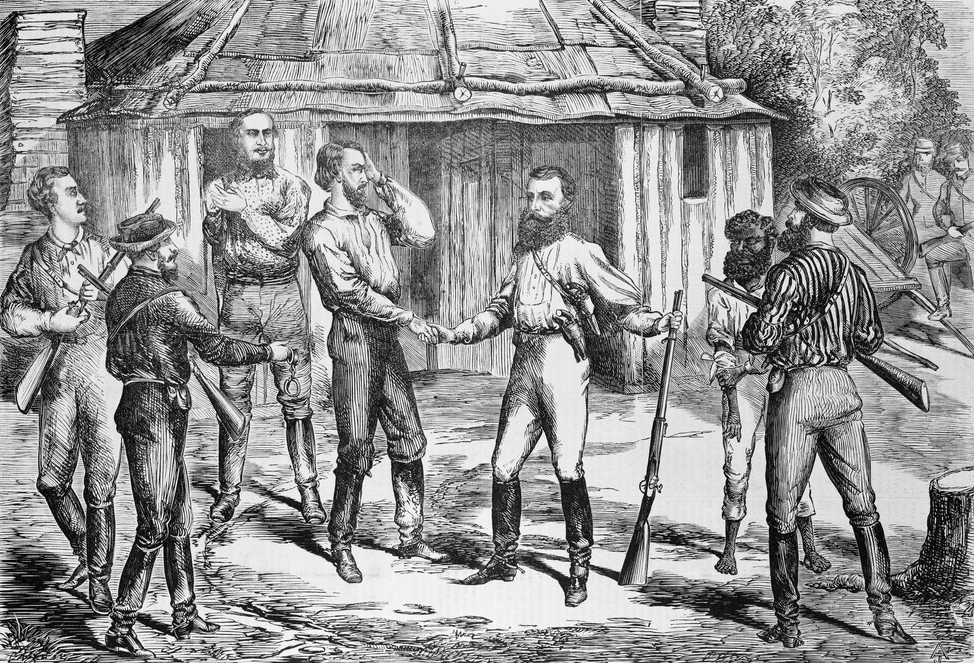
John Clarke shakes hands with the police after he and his brother are apprehended.

They plundered publicans, storekeepers, farmers and travellers. They ambushed gold shipments from Nerrigundah and Araluen and the coaches that traveled from Sydney and the Illawarra. Until November 1866, they marauded almost virtually unchecked in a triangle through the Jingeras from Braidwood to Bega, and up the coast to Moruya and Nelligen. On 9 April 1866, Nerrigundah was raided by the gang. After holding up some passers by at Guelph Creek — wounding one, John Emmott, by gunshot and beating up another — they attacked the store and tavern, taking 40 captives and robbing them. Constable Miles O'Grady was mortally wounded, when he and Constable Smythe tried to intervene. O'Grady shot dead William Fletcher, a new recruit to the gang, and the rest of the gang fled

On 1 June 1866, the gang raided the village of Michelago. They robbed the store for supplies and held some inhabitants captive at the inn, while the gang became drunk, before setting their captives free and—after several hours more of carousing and brawling among themselves—leaving the village.

On 9 January 1867, a party of special constables—John Carroll, Patrick Kennagh, Eneas McDonnell and John Phegan—were ambushed and killed near Jinden Station. They had been tied to a tree and then shot. The Clarke brothers were implicated in the murders. A blood-soaked pound note was pinned to Carroll, the leader, as a warning to anyone else intent on pursuing them.

Their run of luck ended with the conviction at Darlinghurst on 15 February 1867 of Tom Connell for the robbery and assault of John Emmott, when he stole 25 ounces of gold dust, two one-pound notes, some silver coins and a gold watch. The many other exploits of the "Blacksmith", including the death of Constable Miles O'Grady were ignored, but his death sentence was on appeal commuted to life imprisonment. In February 1867, Long Jim "Jemmy the Warrigal", a second member of the gang, fractured his skull in an accident and died.

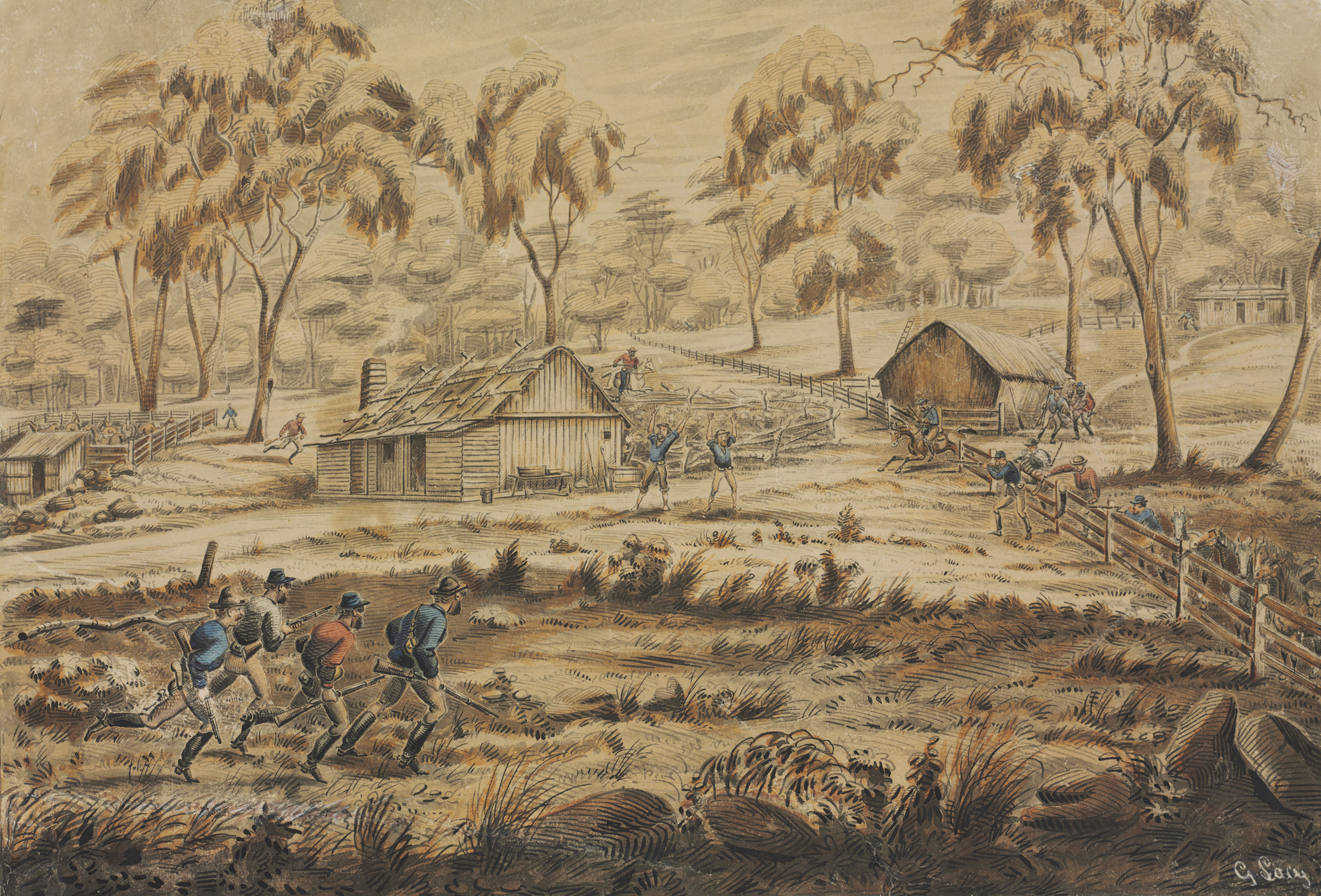
Capture of the bushrangers Thomas and John Clarke, NSW, c 1867

In late March 1867, the drought broke with floods which swept away steam engines, huts and mountains of earth. The remains of Billy Scott believed to have been murdered by his own gang, were found on 9 April, thus reducing the gang to two men, Tom and John Clarke. During April a police patrol led by Senior Constable Wright and an Aboriginal tracker Sir Watkin Wynne (later Sergeant Major Sir Watkin Wynne), followed information to Jinden Creek, and reached Berry's hut on Friday 26 April. The bushrangers and police engaged in a shoot-out that Saturday morning, during which John was shot in the right shoulder, and an undercover policeman received a gunshot graze. Wynne was similarly injured during the fight. Senior Constable Walsh called for the bushrangers to surrender, and eventually they agreed. The reward for Tom Clarke had by then been raised to £1,000 and that for John to £500.

Subsequently, the brothers shook hands with the police, and were arraigned in Braidwood before being taken by coach to the port of Nelligen, where they were shackled to the prison tree. From there they were conveyed to Sydney. On 13 May, they appeared in court for their committal hearing, on wounding Wynne, prior to their capture by Wright, Walsh, Egan and Lenehan. The £1,500 reward was distributed as follows: Wright £300; Walsh £130; Wynne £120; constables Lenehan, Wright and Egan £110 each; sergeant Byrne £30; constables Ford, O'Loughlin, Armstrong, Brown and Woodlands £15 each; and £7 10s each to trackers Emmott and Thomas. £500 went to a civilian informer. This would be the highest reward on offer until £2,000 was announced for the arrest of Ned Kelly.

== Patrick Connell ==
Patrick Connell (1835 – 17 July 1866) was an Irish-born Australian bushranger, outlaw and member of the Clarke gang. After the murder of the police constable, Connell was officially declared an outlaw, and later died in a shootout with the police. Born in County Limerick, Ireland in 1835, Connell migrated as a child with his family to the Colony of New South Wales, Australia, arriving in Sydney in March 1839. They settled in the Southern Tablelands, where they intermarried with other families, including the Clarkes, of the Braidwood district. The Connells, Clarkes and other relatives and associates attracted the attention of the police for stock theft and other criminal activities. In October 1865, when Connell's nephew Thomas Clarke broke out of Braidwood Gaol, they teamed up and, with several others, formed a bushranger gang known as the Clarke gang. Over the next several months, they held up many travelers, stores, hotels and stations.

== Trial and execution ==
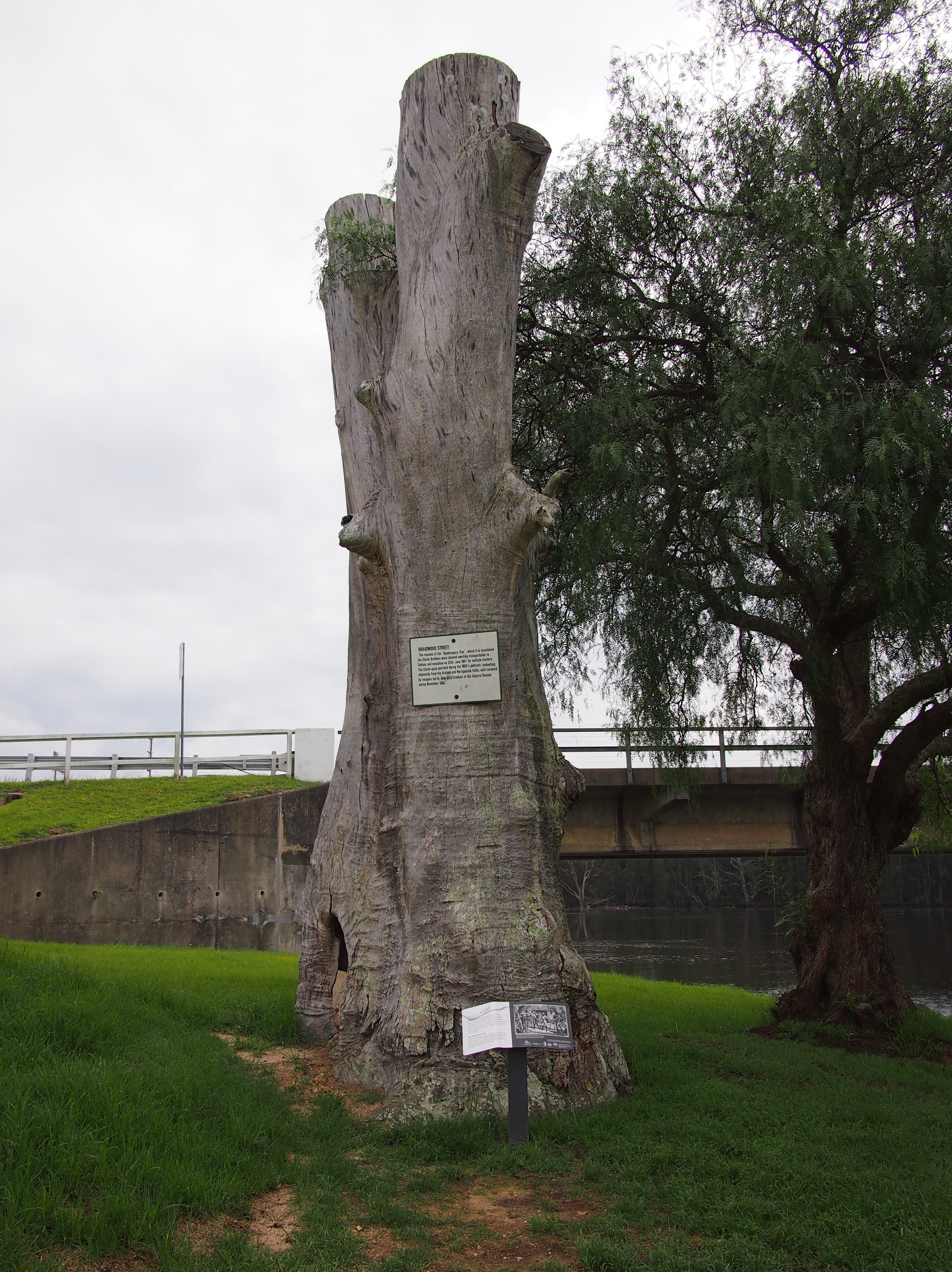
The "Bushrangers Tree" in Nelligen, which is believed to be the tree the Clarke brothers were chained to after their capture

The Clarkes' trial on 28 May 1867 lasted just a day. Chief Justice of New South Wales Sir Alfred Stephen was known to be especially concerned about bushranging, in particular Frank Gardiner, and had most to do with the drafting of the "Felons' Apprehension Act". The prosecutor was the Solicitor General Robert Isaacs and the brothers were defended by William Dalley instructed by Joseph Leary.

It was stated in evidence that "when Thomas Clarke fired, John Clarke fired immediately afterwards ... with the intent to kill and wound the constables."

The jury took 67 minutes to find both brothers guilty. Before passing sentence, Stephen pointed out that the Clarkes were to be hanged, not as retribution, but because their deaths were necessary for the peace, good order, safety and welfare of society. Their fate was to serve as a warning to others. Stephen then pointed out the list of their offences over the previous two years. Thomas: exclusive of the seven murders of which he was suspected, including that of Constable O'Grady, 9 robberies of mails, 36 robberies of individuals including Chinamen, labourers, publicans, storekeepers, tradesmen and settlers, John's offences in one year numbered 26 and his possible implication in the unexplained murder of the four specials. On 13 March 1865, the Araluen Gold Escort was attacked by the gang on the Majors Creek Mountain Road, where two troopers were wounded. The four trooper escorts held off the attack and the gold was delivered to the Bank of New South Wales at Braidwood. Although this attack was carried out by Ben Hall, John Gilbert and John Dunn there was speculation in newspapers of the time that one of the Clarke brothers was the fourth member of the gang in this attack. However, it was mostly Daniel Ryan from Murruburrah and good friend of John Dunn. Ryan was later arrested as a suspect. (The Araluen Escort Attack was dramatised in the 2016 film, The Legend of Ben Hall.)

Following the death sentences, an appeal was made on a point of law. Because of the small number of Supreme Court Justices, the court of appeal was made up of Sir Alfred Stephen the Chief Justice, and Justices John Hargrave and Alfred Cheeke. The rejection of a new trial by two to one led many to believe that the conviction of the Clarkes was not altogether satisfactory. A memorandum was sent to the Governor, Sir John Young and the Executive Council. In the end, neither the Governor nor the ministry decided to interfere with the sentence imposed on either of the Clarkes. They were visited by their two sisters, their brother Jack (brought in from Cockatoo Island Prison), and their uncle Mick Connell (in jail in Sydney awaiting his trial as one of their harbourers under the "Felons’ Apprehension Act" for supplying food, gin and ammunition to the bushrangers in October 1866 as evidenced by his brother's 20-year-old pregnant lover, Lucy Hurley).

Tom Clarke, 27, and his brother John, 21, were hanged from twin gallows at Darlinghurst Jail on 25 June 1867, ending a reign of terror on the south coast of New South Wales which had cost the lives of at least eight men who were mainly police trying to capture the brothers. The Clarkes and other bushrangers may have had some influence in Parkes's campaign for educational reforms. In his electioneering speeches of 1867 he spoke of the Clarkes and the necessity of schools in the outback as a way of putting down bushranging. "The Clarkes and other executed bushrangers were in large measure the victims of circumstances. The eyes of the children of the bush opened upon wild, savage scenery. They grew up creatures of a warm, passionate nature, without knowledge and respect for the law of the land and without any bonds to bind them to the rest of society. We want the means of instructing the young so they shall form an honest and intelligent generation when we shall have passed away". Subsequently, an attempt was made in the Braidwood district to improve the opportunities for education.

== Popular culture ==
Their lives were dramatised in the radio series Outlawry Under the Gums (1933).

== See also ==
- List of serial killers by country
