= Duncan Mackellar =

Scottish-born colonial settler (born c. 1789)

Captain Duncan Mackellar (born c. 1789), was a sea captain who later became a colonial settler in New South Wales, Australia. After a notable maritime career, including a daring escape from French capture in 1812, he visited Sydney in 1822 and decided to settle there. By 1829, he and his nephew, Duncan Mackellar, Junior, acquired substantial land near Braidwood.

Mackellar developed a significant estate and was appointed a magistrate in 1833. Facing the end of convict transportation, he advocated for the importation of indentured labour. In 1836, he sold his land and returned to Scotland, where he published a guide on emigrating to Australia. Despite his brief stay, he is remembered as an early settler in the Braidwood district, commemorated by Mackellar Street and Duncan Street.

== Early life and maritime career ==
Mackellar was born around 1789 in the parish of Kilmodan, Scotland. Known as Duncan Mackellar of Glendaruel, he was recognized as the head of the Mackellar clan. The life of the clans had been suppressed, after the Jacobite Rebellion, under legislation including the Act of Proscription, 1746. Although that Act was repealed in 1782, the Heritable Jurisdictions (Scotland) Act 1746, which had removed the authority of clan chieftains, remained in force. Highland Scots such as Mackellar needed to support themselves.

He became a sea captain and in 1812, his ship was captured by the French and taken to Brest. Demonstrating his leadership and bravery, Mackellar and his crew overpowered the prize crew and escaped back to England. In 1814, Mackellar married Margaret Dick (b. 1794). The couple had five children.

== Ventures in Australia ==
In 1822, Mackellar visited Sydney while commanding Clydesdale, a ship sailing under the license of the East India Company. It is possible that during this visit he decided to settle in the colony, potentially receiving a land grant. By 1825, Mackellar was the captain of City of Edinburgh, a ship owned by The Australian Company of Edinburgh and Leith. This ship operated between Britain and New South Wales. Among the passengers were Mackellar’s nephew, Duncan Mackellar, Junior, and his family.

Mackellar resigned from his seafaring career and decided to stay in New South Wales as a settler during the administration of Governor Darling in 1828. Darling favoured military men for both administrative roles and land grants. Mackellar supported Darling, aligning himself with the "Exclusives," a faction opposed to the "Emancipists" and "Emigrants" who accused Darling's administration of nepotism and cronyism.

== Land acquisition and development ==
In 1829, Mackellar and his nephew acquired a combined total of 3250 acres near present-day Braidwood. By 1830, Mackellar had established a substantial estate with a stone house, a wood slab house, several huts, 12 assigned convicts, and two free servants. The property, known as "Strathalan," was stocked with sheep, cattle, and horses, and had 120 acres cleared.

Mackellar had the right to graze on an additional 6000 acres of adjacent land for a rental payment. He later purchased 4000 acres, likely some of the land he had been renting. By 1835, he was applying to buy more land near his nephew’s grant, west of the Shoalhaven River, at Bombay.

In 1833, Mackellar was appointed a magistrate, recognizing his prominence in the district.

== Later years and legacy ==
By 1837, facing the potential end of convict transportation, the large landholders, including Mackellar, advocated for the immigration of "coolies" from India or China to replace convict labour. Mackellar gave evidence to a committee of the Legislative Council in June 1837, supporting this idea. However, this plantation-style economy was opposed by other colonists seeking self-government.

Mackellar sold his landholding in 1836, likely at a significant profit, to John Coghill. He returned to Scotland in 1837 and published An Emigrant's Guide to Australia in 1839, detailing his farming experiences in New South Wales. He claimed that his £3500 investment in sheep had grown to £24,000 in eight years.

The exact date of Mackellar's death is unclear. His nephew, Duncan Mackellar, Junior, died in 1838, with his landholding held in trust for his three sons. Although Mackellar did not remain long in New South Wales, he is remembered as one of the first colonial settlers of the Braidwood district. Mackellar Street and Duncan Street in Braidwood are named in honour of both him and his nephew.

== See also ==
- History of Braidwood, New South Wales
