= Nerrigundah, New South Wales =

Nerrigundah
- Suburb
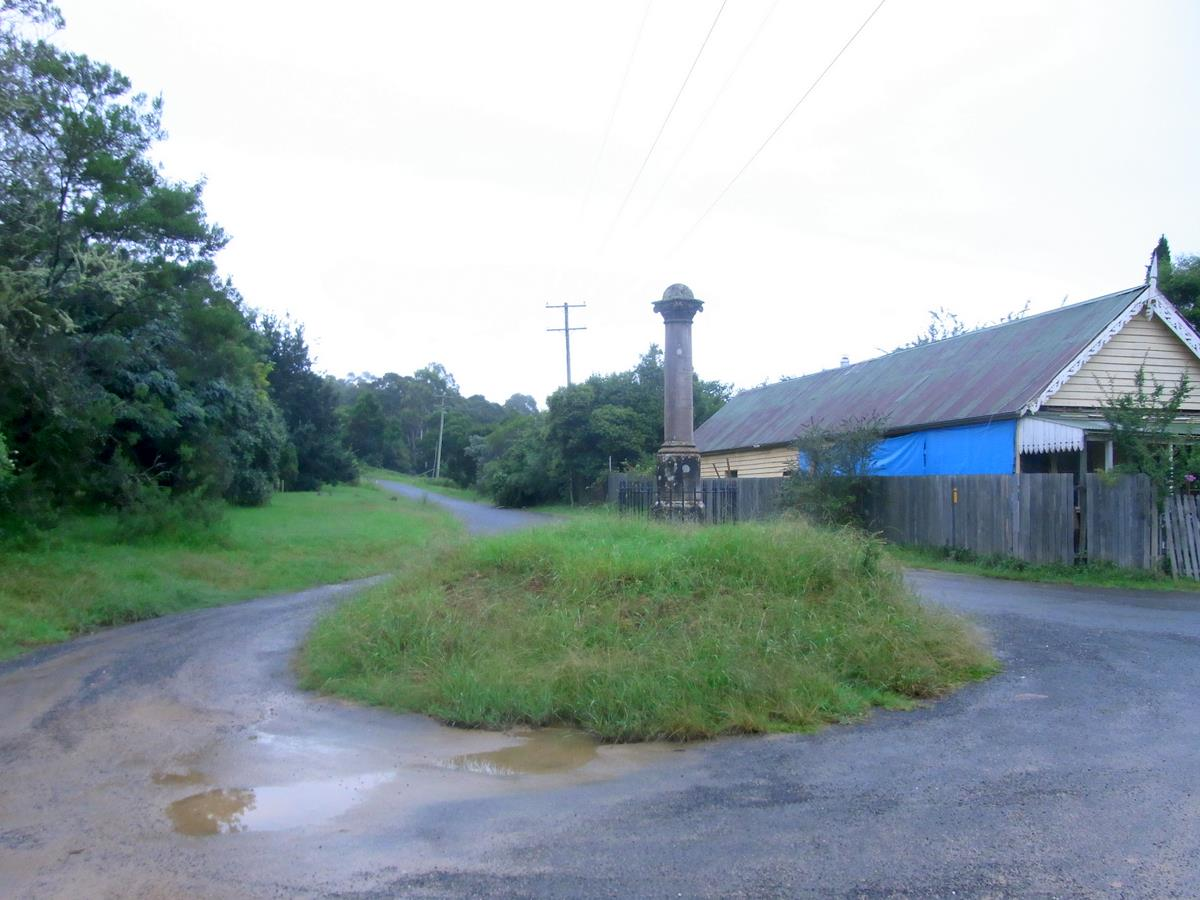
- Former store, the last building in Nerrigundah village centre (since destroyed by fire in 2019) and memorial obelisk to Constable Miles O'Grady, killed by bushrangers in 1866

- Coordinates: 36°07′S 149°54′E
- Country: Australia
- State: New South Wales
- LGA: Eurobodalla

Government
  - State electorate: Bega
  - Federal divisions: Eden-Monaro; Gilmore

Population
  - Total: 40 (SAL 2021)
- Time zone: UTC+10 (AEST)
  - Summer (DST): UTC+11 (AEDT)

Nerrigundah is a locality and former village in south eastern New South Wales situated at the head of the Tuross River Valley, nineteen kilometres inland from Bodalla. At the 2021 census, the locality had a population of 40.

The Walbanga people, a group of the Yuin once lived over the area. It is not known how long the Walbanga people lived over the area as the area underwent significant change with sea level rise 18,000 to 7,500 years ago which completely displaced inhabitants of previous coastal areas and resulted in dramatic changes in distributions of peoples. The place name, Nerrigundah, is derived from an aboriginal word for 'camp where edible berries grow'.

Nerrigundah and its valley were used as a cattle run by Thomas Mort of Bodalla prior to the discovery of gold on 23 December 1860 by George Cook, Joseph Goodenough and William Crouch. The discovery of gold was recorded at the office of the Gold Commissioner at Braidwood, New South Wales on 2 January 1861.

On 8 April 1866, Nerrigundah was raided by bushrangers, the Clarke brothers, Thomas and John, and their associates. They held up a number of passers-by outside the town at Deep Creek and then attacked the store and hotel. During the raid, William Fletcher, a new recruit to the gang, was shot dead by NSW Police trooper Miles O'Grady when he and constable Smythe confronted the gang. Trooper O'Grady was shot and later died of his wounds and was buried in Moruya. A monument to his memory was erected and remains at Nerrigundah.

Although the area was already a mining settlement, the site of the Village of Nerrigundah was not reserved until April 1868. The plan of the village probably reflects the irregular layout of the earlier settlement.

Gold mining in the area continued into the early years of the 20th century.

Following its heyday during gold mining, Nerrigundah survived as a small village sustained by local production of timber, wattle bark (for tanning) and eucalyptus oil. Nerrigundah had a sawmill that provided employment, including for local Yuin people. The sawmilling company also provided housing. The sawmilling operation had ended by 2000.

The village had a school from 1863 to 1923 and again from 1959 to 1972. The village has more than one burial ground, including the cemetery dedicated in 1904.

Nerrigundah was severely affected by bushfire, during the 2019–2020 Australian summer. On 31 December 2019, fire destroyed the village's hall and 20 of its 25 homes and one of its residents died. Despite this catastrophe, the population of the locality increased between the 2016 and 2021 censuses.
