= HMS Decouverte (1806) =

History

France
- Name: Eclipse
- Launched: 1804
- Fate: Captured 1806

United Kingdom
- Name: HMS Decouverte
- Namesake: Discovery
- Acquired: Purchased 1806
- Decommissioned: 1816
- Fate: Sold 1816

General characteristics
- Tons burthen: 181 (bm)
- Length: 80 ft 3 in (24.5 m) (overall)
- Beam: 22 ft 6 in (6.9 m) (overall)
- Depth of hold: 10 ft 2 in (3.1 m) (overall)
- Sail plan: Schooner
- Armament: 12 × 12-pounder carronades + 2 × 6-pounder chase guns

HMS Decouverte was the French schooner Eclipse, launched in 1804, that was captured in 1806. The Royal Navy took her into service as HMS Decouverte. She served in the Caribbean, where she captured two privateers, one French and one American. She was sold in 1816.

== French service ==
Eclipse was built as a schooner and launched in 1804. She was captured in 1807. The Royal Navy already had an Eclipse, but had just laid up a Découverte, so the captured vessel became HMS Decouverte. She was registered on 3 January 1806.

== British service ==
Between 1806 and 1807, Decouverte was under the command of Lieutenant the Honourable A. de Courcy. (It is not clear whether it was he who first commissioned her.)

In March 1807 Decouverte detained Trist, Rinker, master, as Trist was sailing from Bordeaux to New Orleans.

In February 1808 Decouverte was under the command of Lieutenant Colin Campbell. In that month she captured one French privateer and destroyed another, as well as the privateer's prize.

On 7 February Campbell was cruising between Altavella and the Main, when he discovered three vessels, two French schooner privateers and an English ship, their prize. One schooner escaped after a running battle. Decouverte succeeded in driving the other schooner and the ship on shore. Next morning, when Campbell sailed in to take possession of the two vessels, he found the enemy still in possession, covered by small arms fire from the shore. The British were able by cannon fire to drive the French from the ship. Campbell sent a request to the schooner under a flag of truce that she surrender the ship, together with whatever prisoners might be on board the schooner. The schooner's captain refused. Campbell then deployed a boarding party that set fire to the ship. The water was too shallow for the British to be able to get closer to the schooner, but Campbell was confident that she was wrecked on the rocks. The ship was Matilda, of Halifax, Nova Scotia, which had been sailing to Jamaica.

In the morning of 9 February, Cambell discovered an enemy schooner in Bottomless Cove. Decouverte gave chase and caught up with her by 3p.m. After a 45-minute exchange of fire, the enemy schooner struck. She turned out to be Dorade, from San Domingo. Dorade was armed with one long 18-pounder gun and two 9-pounder guns, and had a crew of 72 men under the command of Monsieur Netly. During the engagement three guns on Decouverte on the side in action were dismounted, which reduced her broadside. French casualties were heavy; the British had to bury at sea seven of Dorade's crew and Campbell estimated that they had lost and thrown overboard seven more during the fight. There were also three wounded. The British did not go unscathed; Decouverte had six men wounded, of whom one was mortally wounded and three were dangerously wounded.

On 21 January 1809 Decouverte arrived at Jamaica from Maraycabu.

Decouverte came under the command in, in 1809, of Lieutenant Richard W. Graves.

Next, in 1809-10 Decouverte was under the command of Lieutenant James Oliver until a severe eye injury forced Oliver to return to England. In 1812 there was a diplomatic correspondence about three seamen on Decouverte, all of whom claimed to be Americans, and one of whom claimed that Oliver had destroyed his protection (certificate of citizenship).

In April 1811 Lieutenant Richard Williams assumed command of Decouverte. Under his command she patrolled the Bahamas and the Gulfs of Mexico and Florida.

In June Decouverte brought into Nassau the slave ship Joanna. The number of enslaved people freed was 120. Decouverte also detained a schooner flying the Swedish flag but carrying French property.

On her way to Jamaica Decouverte chased the French privateer Comet, of five guns and 80 men, for two hours. Williams had to give up the chase after a squall sent overboard Decouverte's fore-top-gallant mast and sprung her two lower masts, the fore mast badly. When Decouverte reached Port Royal she was ordered to undergo a thorough refit, something that would take nine months.

While Decouverte underwent repairs the merchants of Jamaica lent the schooner Confiance to the Royal Navy. During this time Williams commanded Confiance.

After Williams and Decouverte returned to sea, on 12 July 1812 she captured the American privateer Non-Pareil. Nonpareil, H. Martin, master, was armed with one gun and had a crew of 30 men. She was out of Savannah, Georgia, and had captured one schooner. Martin also had intended to attack the defenseless town of Harbour Island, Bahamas.

Between 28 July and 23 October 1812, British warships sent into Nassau 39 American and Spanish ships with American cargoes. Decouverte sent in Olympus (captured 29 July), sailing from Oporto to Havanah, and Augusta (captured 29 August), Haskell, master, sailing from Greenock to Charleston. These were carrying flour and logwood.

Decouverte also drove two privateers from the coast, but was unable to capture them. While she was in Murray's anchorage, Bermuda, a heavy gale came up. Her crew was forced to cut away her masts to save her as she was only two cable-lengths (580 yards) from the shore.

While escorting a convoy from New Providence on its way to Jamaica and Cape Haitian through the Caicos Passage, Decouverte prevented the American privateer brig Saratoga, of 16 guns and 140 men, from capturing a schooner. In 1814 Williams was transferred to the brig Edward, a brigantine of 360 tons, 12 guns, and 74 men, possibly a transport, but his period of command was short-lived as an officer sent from England replaced him. Before Williams left the Jamaica station in 1815, he received a letter of thanks from the mayor and merchants of Kingston for his services to the trade.

By May 1815 Decouverte was under the command of Lieutenant Robert Bladey. Baldey carried Simón Bolívar and some of his followers from the coast of what is now Venezuela to Jamaica. Decouverte arrived in Jamaica on 14 May.

At some point Lieutenant Bladey assumed command of Variable, though it is not entirely clear if that was before or after he sailed Decouverte to extract Bolívar.

== Fate ==
The Navy sold Decouverte in 1816.
