= HMS Variable (1814) =

UK naval brig (1814–1817)

History

United Kingdom
- Name: Edward
- Launched: 1812, United States
- Acquired: 31 October 1814 by purchase of a prize
- Renamed: HMS Variable
- Fate: Broken up, December 1817

General characteristics
- Tons burthen: 324, or 360 (bm)
- Length: Overall: 104 ft 6 in (31.9 m); Keel: 82 ft 2 in (25.0 m)
- Beam: 27 ft 3 in (8.3 m)
- Depth of hold: 13 ft 0 in (4.0 m)
- Complement: 95
- Armament: 12 × 24-pounder carronades + 2 × 6-pounder guns

HMS Variable was the United States brig Edward, built in 1812, captured and brought into Jamaica that the Royal Navy purchased in 1814. The Navy sold her in 1817 for breaking up.

== Career ==
Rear Admiral William Brown appointed Lieutenant Richard Williams, from the schooner HMS Decouverte to the command of Edward, "a brigantine of 360 tons, 12 guns, and 74 men". Brown appointed Williams to Edward with a view to Williams' promotion. At some point Edward was renamed Variable.

Edward/Variable participated in the expedition against New Orleans. On her return, Williams found out that he had been superseded in command by Lieutenant John Sykes, whom the Admiralty had sent out from England to take command.

Before Williams left the Jamaica station in 1815, he received a letter of thanks from the mayor and merchants of Kingston for his services to the trade.

Lieutenant Robert Baldey replaced Sykes, perhaps after Baldey returned to Jamaica in May 1815 after having carried Simón Bolívar in Decouverete from what is now Venezuela to Jamaica.

== Fate ==
Variable arrived at Portsmouth on 17 July 1816 from Jamaica and Havana. She arrived at Gravesend on 25 July and was paid off and laid up there. She was broken up in December 1817.
