= Bedervale =

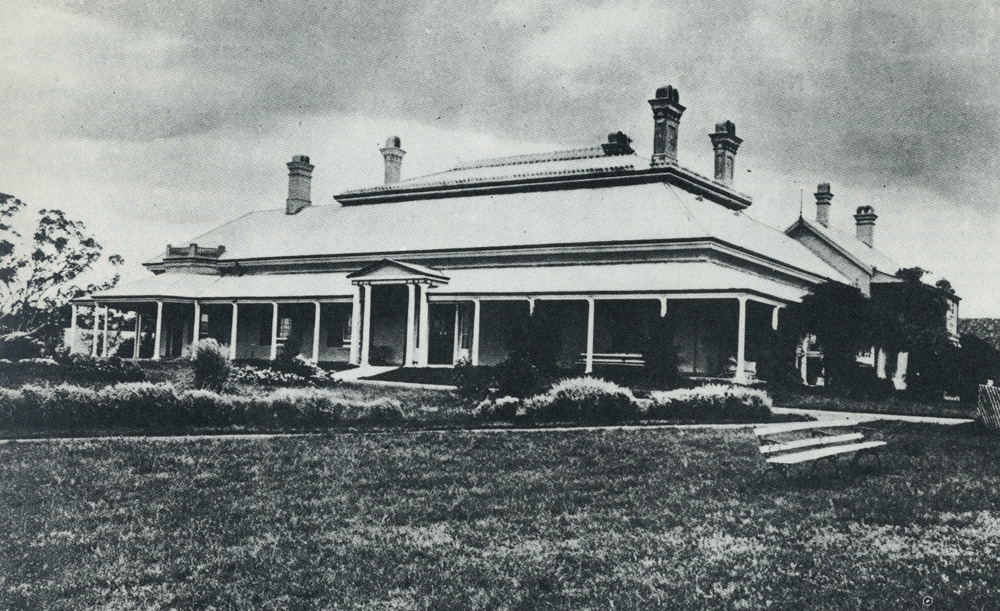
- Bedervale, Braidwood, circa 1910

- Location within New South Wales Location within Australia
- 35.4693°S 149.8052°E
- Location: Monkitee Street, Braidwood, Queanbeyan-Palerang Region, New South Wales, Australia

History
- Built: 1836–1842

Site notes
- Architect: John Verge
- Owner: National Trust of Australia (NSW)

New South Wales Heritage Register
- Official name: Bedervale
- Type: State heritage (landscape)
- Designated: 2 April 1999
- Reference no.: 17
- Type: Farm
- Category: Farming and Grazing
- Builders: John Coghill

Bedervale is a heritage-listed colonial homestead in Braidwood, New South Wales, Australia. The house was designed by John Verge and was completed in 1842.

Bedervale is owned privately and the homestead's contents were purchased by the National Trust of Australia (NSW) to maintain the interior collection. The garden is also historically significant as it contains many plantings dating from the 19th century and the orchard contains older varieties of fruit trees. There is also a cemetery on the estate which has historical importance. The homestead was added to the New South Wales State Heritage Register on 2 April 1999.

== History ==
=== John and Jane Coghill ===
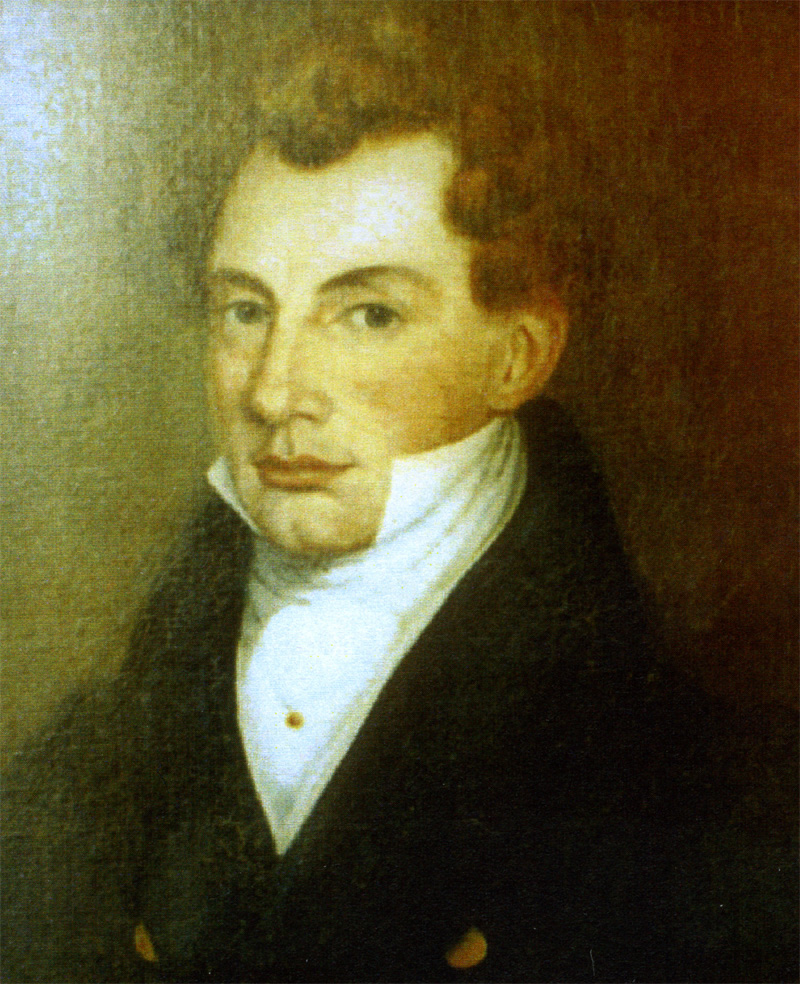
John Coghill circa 1810

John Coghill was born in 1785 at Wick in Scotland. In 1814 he married Jane Grean who was born in Lisbon in 1797. She was the daughter of Francis and Jane Grean. At the time of their marriage he was 29 and she was only 17. In 1820 he became Captain of the convict ship Mangles of which he was part owner. He made four voyages between New South Wales and England over the next six years. In 1826 he sold his ship and decided to settle on the land.

By now he was the father of four children. David Francis was born in 1816, Jane Charlotte in 1819, Elizabeth (who inherited Bedervale) in 1822 and Mary Ann in 1825. Emma, his youngest daughter, was born a year after he retired from the sea in 1827.

He had already obtained land near Berrima and in 1826 after he sold his ship he became part owner of Kirkham near Camden and resided there as manager for about ten years. During this time he purchased 5,600 acres (23 km^{2}) near Braidwood and ran sheep and cattle there but it was not until about the mid-thirties that he commissioned John Verge to build Bedervale on his property. The house was completed by 1842. During the time it was being built he purchased Strathalan near Braidwood where the family lived from 1837 before going to Bedervale. In 1843 he also bought Braidwood Farm later called Mona.

The eldest daughter Jane Charlotte had already married Donald Campbell Simson in 1839 and was living in Victoria before the family moved to their new house. Unfortunately shortly after they moved to Bedervale their third daughter Mary Ann died in 1844. The death notice stated that she died after a long and painful illness. The year after her death the family decided to go to England and Europe. David, their only son was left in charge of the property and the couple went abroad with their two daughters Elizabeth and Emma.

It was during this trip that Elizabeth met Robert Maddrell who was at that time studying medicine at the Heidelberg University. The couple married in 1848 in Kensington, London. Unfortunately while they were abroad their son David died at Braidwood. While checking stock he became ill in late July 1847 and in early August he died. Both the Coghill and Maddrell families returned to Bedervale. Elizabeth and Robert Maddrell lived at a nearby cottage at Braidwood Farm for several years and assisted the Coghills with the management of the farm. In 1853 John Coghill died at the age of 68 and the Maddrells inherited Bedervale.

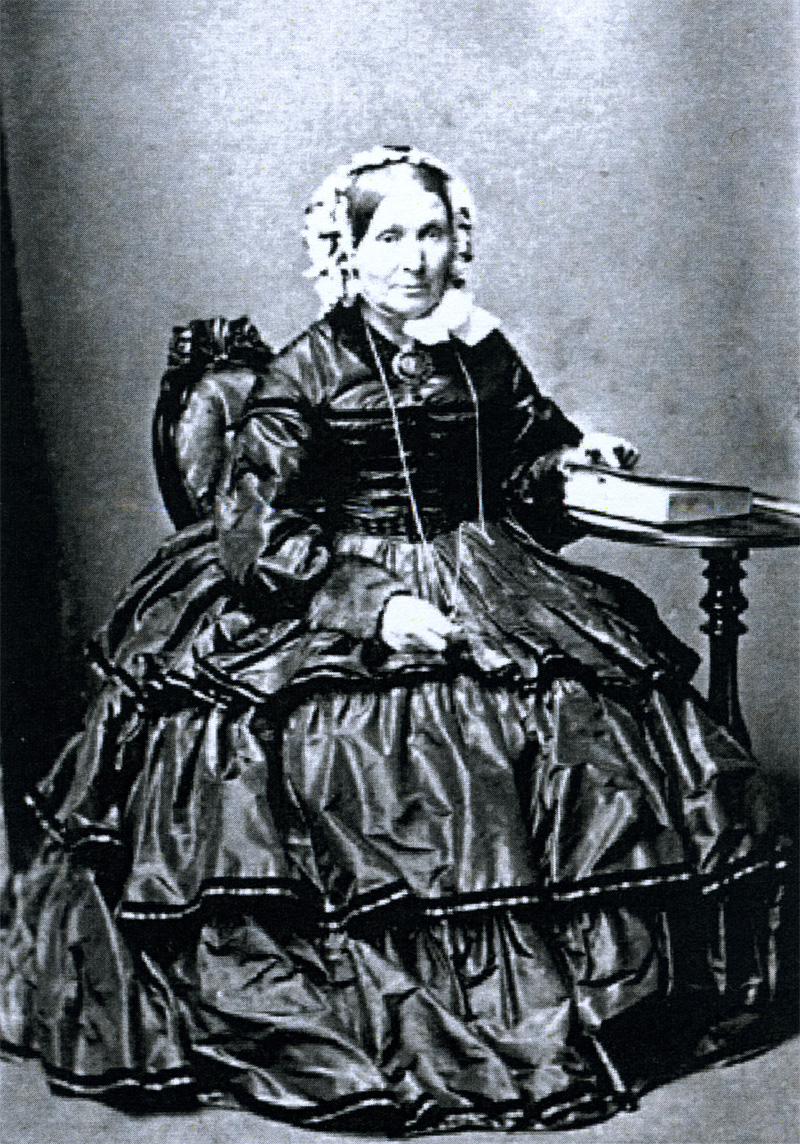
Jane Coghill, wife of John Coghill circa 1860

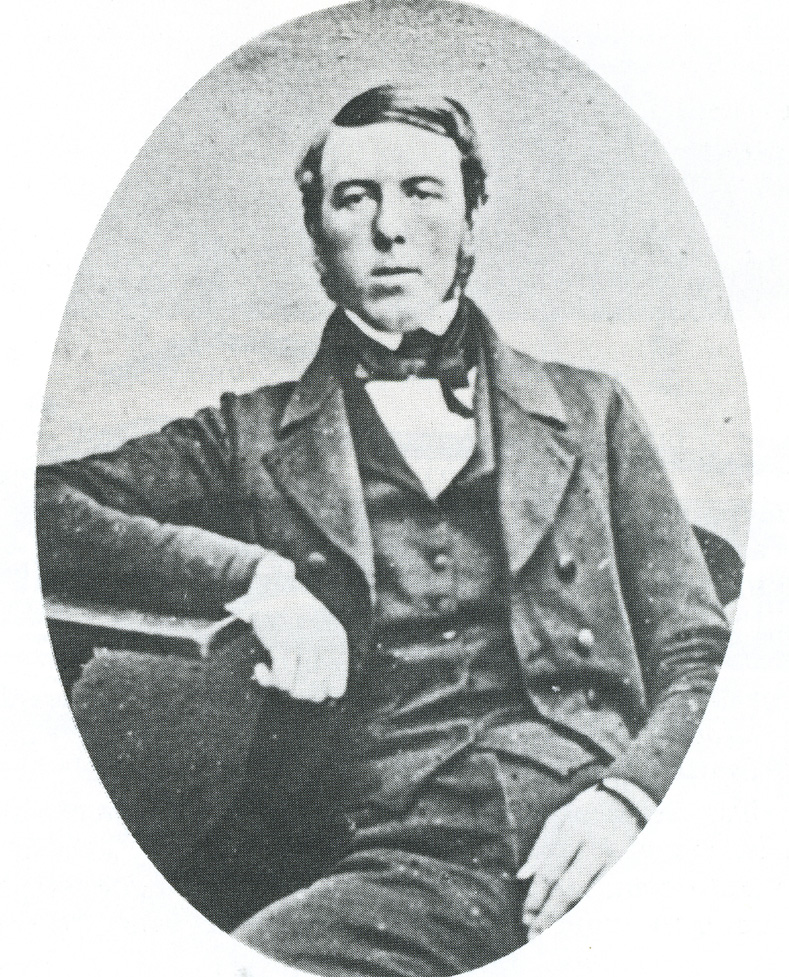
David Coghill, only son of John Coghill circa 1840

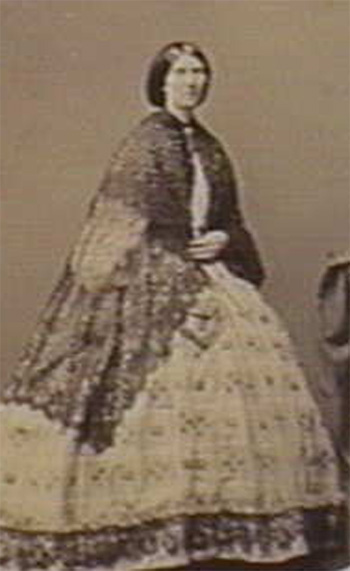
Emma Voss (formerly Coghill) youngest daughter of John Coghill

=== Robert and Elizabeth Maddrell ===
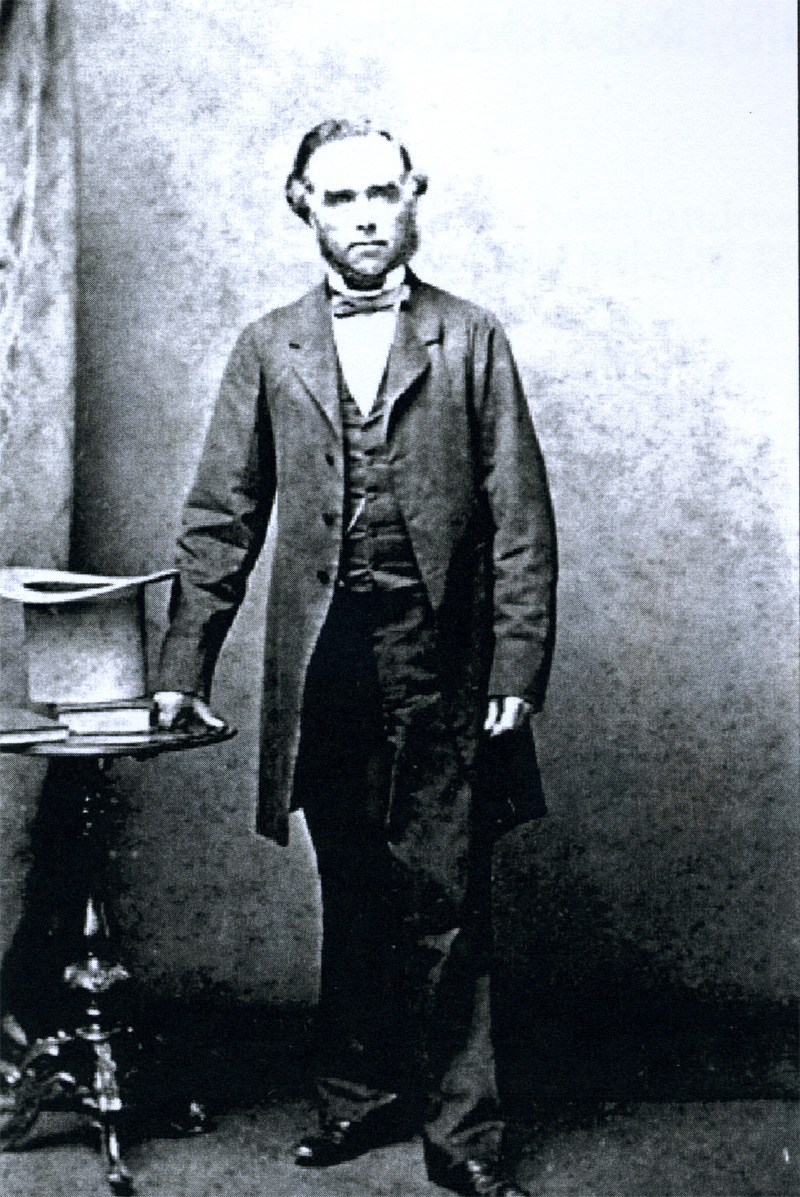
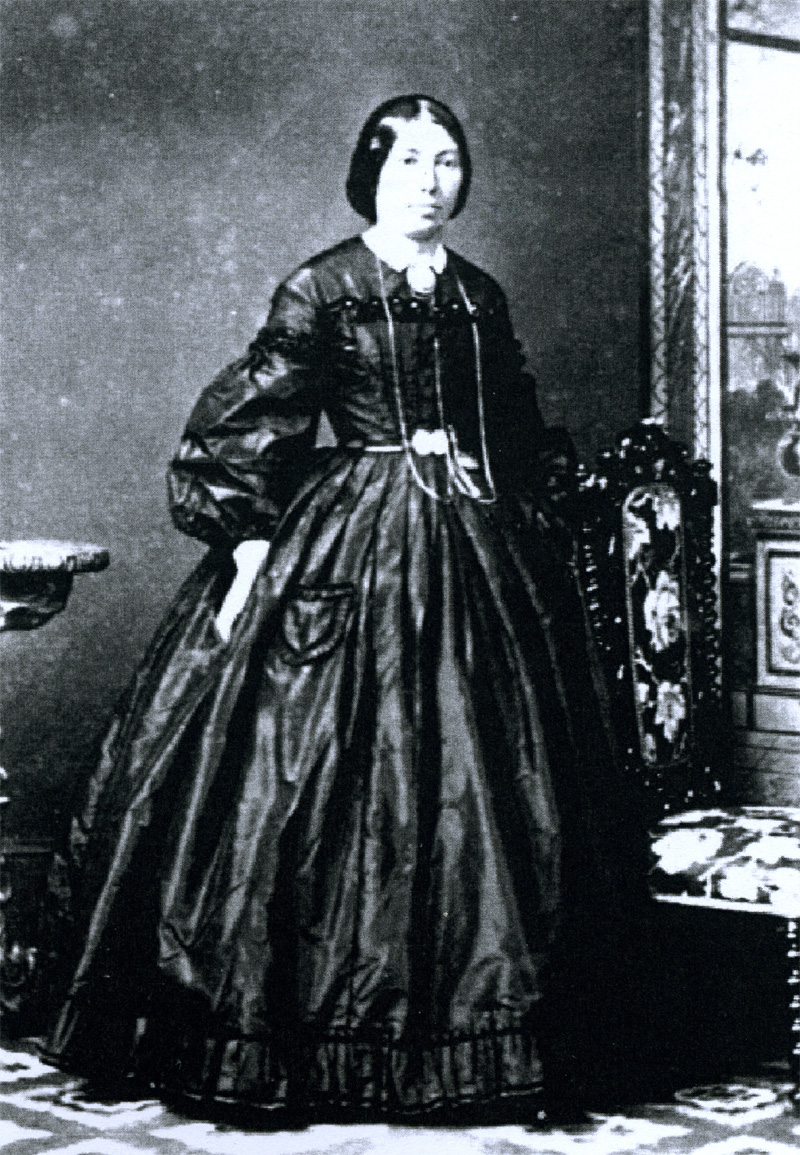
Elizabeth and Robert Maddrell who inherited Bedervale after John Coghill's death in 1853

Robert Maddrell was born in 1819 in Ballamaddrell on the Isle of Man. His family had been landowners there for generations. He became a medical student at Heidelberg University and a student of chemistry. In 1848 he had a paper published in the Journal of the Chemical Society of London. When he arrived in Sydney with Elizabeth he was uncertain about his future as he did not know if John Coghill intended to include him in the management of Bedervale. At first he was considering taking a post he had been offered as a professor of Chemistry at the recently established University of Sydney. However Coghill welcomed him as an assistant and his future was as a grazier at Braidwood instead of an academic in Sydney.

When Elizabeth and Robert inherited Bedervale in 1853 they had two children Robert John Coghill Maddrell (who inherited Bedervale) born in 1849 and Emma Jane born in 1851. After they moved into Bedervale they had four more children, Henry Francis born in 1854 Isabella Ann born in 1858, Alice Maude in 1963 and Charles Braidwood born in 1865. Besides their children Robert and Elizabeth cared for other residents at Bedervale. Jane Coghill, Elizabeth's mother, lived there until her death in 1884. Janes sister Elizabeth Wilmott, a widow, also stayed with the family from 1845 until her death at the age of 86 in 1877. She was buried in Braidwood Cemetery. Until 1861 Elizabeth's youngest sister Emma (see photo above) also lived at Bedervale. In that year she married in St Andrew's Church Braidwood, Houlton Voss who was from Goulburn. Unfortunately their third daughter Alice Maude died in 1876 at the age of 13.

Robert and Elizabeth owned Bedervale for almost 50 years and during that time the property expanded markedly. The original acreage was increased to 33,000 acres and a new system of tenant farming was introduced. In 1860 Robert Maddrell commissioned Ardill, a surveyor, to draw up a plan of small acreages suitable for farming and these were rented out. The scheme continued until 1930 when the farms were put on the market.

Robert and Elizabeth were both involved in the Braidwood community. Robert was a local Magistrate and Chairman of the Committee of the first school in the area. He was also Chairman for the Pastoral and Agricultural Association. Both of them had a strong interest in the Anglican Church and they gave large sums of money to the building of St. Andrews Church. Elizabeth died in 1897 at the age of 75. and Robert died three years later in 1900 at the age of 81. Both were buried in the Braidwood Cemetery.

Robert divided his estate into three for each of his sons. In his will he left considerable amounts of money for his two surviving daughters Emma Jane who had remained single and Isabella who had married Percy Douglas in 1881. Robert John Coghill Maddrell his eldest son, inherited Bedervale.

=== Robert and Katie Maddrell ===
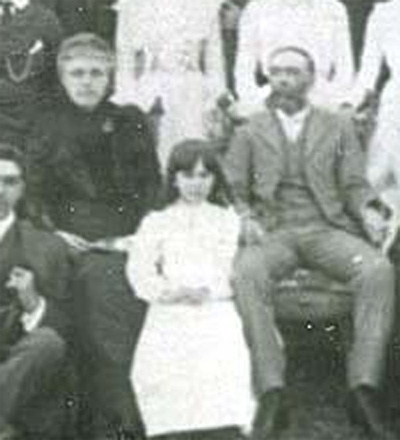
Katie and Robert Maddrell circa 1900 at about the time Robert inherited Bedervale

Robert John Coghill Maddrell was the eldest son of Robert Maddrell and was born at Bedervale in 1849. In 1873 he married Katie Laura Knapp who was the daughter of Edward James Howes Knapp and Rosina Aaron. Edward Knapp was a well-known surveyor and had in his youth conducted several important surveys with Robert Hoddle, the explorer, around southern NSW in about 1828.

After their marriage the couple lived in Mona Cottage Braidwood where they had eleven children. Robert inherited Bedervale in 1900 when he was 51 years old. At that time none of their children had married so many of them went with the couple to live at Bedervale.

Robert died in 1927 at the age of 77. He was survived by his wife Katie and ten of his eleven children. One of his children Percy had died the previous year of pneumonia in a Sydney Private Hospital. Katie lived for another ten years and resided at Bedervale until her death in 1937. The property remained in the family until 1973.

=== Bedervale Today ===
Robert Arthur Coghill Maddrell sold Bedervale of Braidwood to the Royds family during Easter of 1973. The terms of the sale included the homestead and the surrounding property and livestock. The terms excluded the contents of the house at that point, the Royds family agreed to purchase the contents of the homestead within the following two years. This arrangement was not executed by the Royds due to financial constraints. As a consequence, Robert A. C. Maddrell then arranged for the contents to be purchased by the National Trust of Australia, in order to maintain this invaluable collection of Australia's earliest beginnings. Due to the actions of Robert Maddrell, the National Trust were bestowed custodianship therefore ensuring the collection would perpetually remain the property of the Australian public and in its rightful location at Bedervale.

After two years Mr TR Royds arranged for a National Estate Grant to purchase the furniture collection, and nominated the National Trust of Australia (NSW) as owners.

During the 1980s with the assistance from Heritage Assistance program funding, Bedervale was restored.

The house and gardens are open to the public (by appointment) and are listed on the National Trust of Australia (NSW) website.

== Description ==
Bedervale is a large single storey, Georgian house, built of brick stuccoed and lined to simulate stone. Roman Doric columns support a pedimented entablature over an opening flanked by arched semi-circular recesses. The original shingled roof, which is still in place, was built in four continuous pitches. An extra roof of iron was added to improve drainage. The joinery is of polished cedar, the floors are timber and the timber verandah is columned. The verandah floor is flagged. Two flanking wings and a two-storey stable block form an enclosed courtyard. The stables comprise horse stalls, saddle room, grain room and coach house with loft above.

The physical condition of the property was reported as good as in 22 December 1997.

The furniture and furnishings including paintings, china, and cutlery are retained in their original setting making it an intact and original collection.

=== Modifications and dates ===
- 1830s – wings built to allow occupation of the site during the construction of the residence proper.
- 1836 – John Verge designs Bedervale.
- 1842 – Construction completed.
- 1888 – original timber shingles covered with iron and a second higher roof added over the central valley for drainage and chimneys extended to balance.
- 1905 – bay windows added on left of the house. Water and gas connected to house.
- 1975 – furniture and furnishings purchased by National Trust of Australia (NSW) under a National Estate Grant to ensure their retention in their original setting.
- 1980s – restoration works

== Heritage listing ==
Bedervale homestead, flanking wings and two storey barn, all set around a central courtyard constitutes one of the most outstanding groups of rural buildings dating from New South Wales' colonial phase of development. It was designed by John Verge in 1836 and finished about 1842 for Captain John Coghill, an early pastoralist and MLC. The house remained in the ownership of the Maddrell family and descendants for over 120 years. The house contains original furniture and furnishings making it a rare and important intact collection in their original setting.

Bedervale is the grandest colonial homestead in this part of NSW with some of the smartest interiors of its time. Largely unaltered since Edwardian times it contains notable examples of period interior decoration and detail. With its substantial stable and graveyard and other outbuildings it is a considerable rural group. The cultural landscape including ornamental garden vestiges, orchard, entry drives, ground formations, mature shelterbelts and other vegetation and the cemetery, provides a setting and environmental heritage context for the highly significant building group. As such the landscape is a critical part of the site curtilage. Individual elements carry importance such as specimen plantings (e.g. Araucaria bidwillii [bunya pine] being a very rare plant in this region and probably only one of three surviving trees in Tallaganda Shire). Many plantings are old dating well into last century. The orchard contains older varieties of fruit trees worth more detailed investigation. The extant ground formations have the capacity to demonstrate early layouts revealing how the site was approached and circulation patterns. The cemetery is representative of the larger early estates and is historically important. The estate is well known for its association with prominent early colonial families as well as with architect John Verge.

Bedervale was listed on the New South Wales State Heritage Register on 2 April 1999 having satisfied the following criteria.

- The place is important in demonstrating the course, or pattern, of cultural or natural history in New South Wales. Bedervale homestead, flanking wings and two storey barn, all set around a central courtyard constitutes one of the most outstanding groups of rural buildings dating from New South Wales' colonial phase of development. It was designed by John Verge in 1836 and finished about 1842 for Captain James Coghill an early pastoralist and MLC. The house has been in the ownership of the Maddrell family and descendants for over 120 years. The House contains a rare and intact collection of original furniture.
- The place is important in demonstrating aesthetic characteristics and/or a high degree of creative or technical achievement in New South Wales. Bedervale is a large Georgian house with very finely detailed cedar joinery to the interiors. Bedervale homestead is set on a property of 500 acres, located over a rise from Braidwood and has extensive views across the township, Mount Jillamatong and the coastal range.
- The place possesses uncommon, rare or endangered aspects of the cultural or natural history of New South Wales. The furniture and furnishings including paintings, china, and cutlery are retained in their original setting making it a rare and original collection.
- The place is important in demonstrating the principal characteristics of a class of cultural or natural places/environments in New South Wales. Bedervale is an outstanding group of rural buildings dating from New South Wales' colonial phase of development.
