= John Coghill (Australian politician) =

Australian politician and naval captain

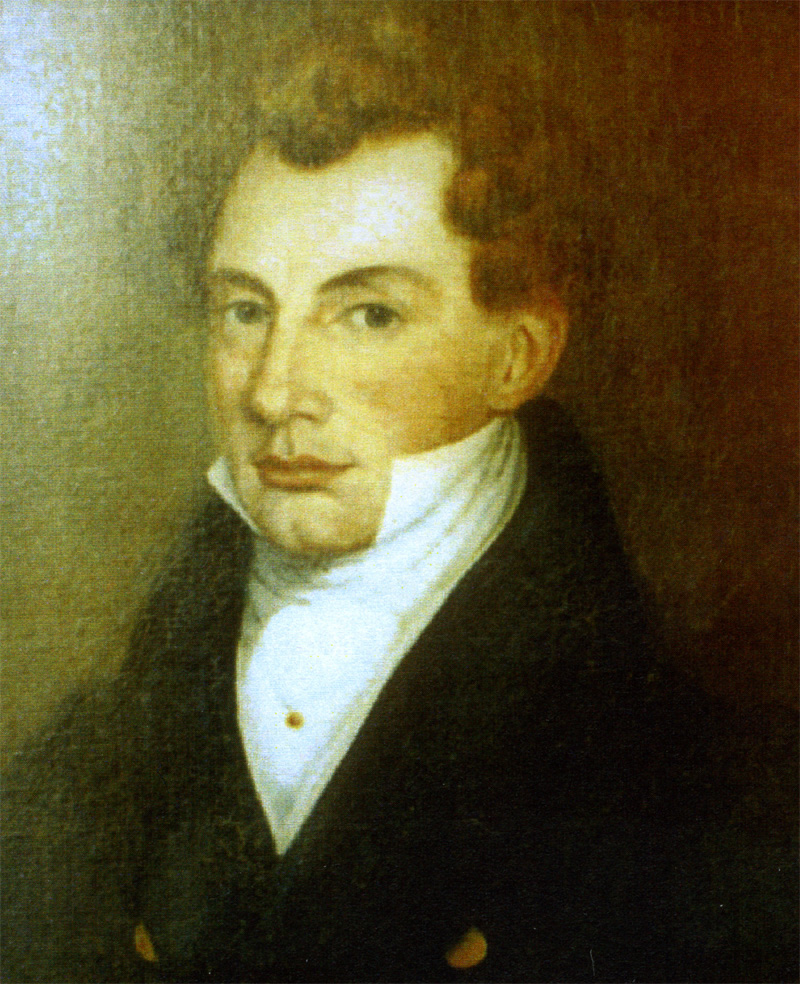
John Coghill

John Coghill (1785–1853) was an Australian politician and naval captain.

He was the master of the ship Mangles, which transported convicts to New South Wales from 1820 to 1826. After settling in New South Wales in 1826 he became a magistrate, and was based in Braidwood, where he built the Bedervale homestead. From 1843 to 1845 he was a member of the New South Wales Legislative Council. During 1841, he was in command of the convict road gang that built The Wool Road.

In Braidwood, there is a wall plaque to his memory, in Anglican Church of St Andrew. Coghill Street is named after him.
