= Brou =

Brou may refer to:

- Brou, Eure-et-Loir, a village and commune in France
- Brou-sur-Chantereine, a village and commune in Seine-et-Marne, France
- Royal Monastery of Brou, in Bourg-en-Bresse, France
- Brou Kouakou (born 1948), Ivorian long jumper
- Brou people, a Khmer Loeu ethnic group in Cambodia
- Lake Brou - near Tuross Head, New South Wales, Australia

== See also ==
- BROU or Banco de la República Oriental del Uruguay - the state-owned, largest bank in Uruguay
- Broulee, New South Wales
  - Broulee Island Nature Reserve
- Brau (disambiguation)
