= William Oldrey =

Captain William Oldrey (1787—1851) was an officer in the Royal Navy and later a colonial settler of New South Wales, Australia. He is particularly associated with the early days of Broulee, on the South Coast of New South Wales.

== Early life and naval career ==
Oldrey was born on 23 November 1787, in Devon, England.

He joined the Royal Navy in June 1804. His first ship, on which he attained the rank of Midshipman, in July 1804, was Warrior. His first ship's captain was William Bligh. Bligh specifically requested Oldrey, as his navigator. In 1805, following Bligh's appointment as Governor of New South Wales, it was aboard Porpoise, bringing Bligh to the colony in 1806, that Oldrey first visited New South Wales. He returned to England aboard Buffalo in 1807. He may possibly have shared in the prize money won by the Buffalo and 69 other ships, when some Russian naval ships—one carrying the pay for the Russian Mediterranean squadron—were caught in Portsmouth Harbour, at the time that the Tsar Alexander I declared war on Great Britain, in October 1807.

While a Lieutenant aboard Undaunted, and in command of a boat from that frigate, on 3 May 1813, he boarded and took a French brig, while under cannonade from the batteries of Marsaille. On 7 May 1813, he attacked a French schooner protecting a number of coastal vessel, taking two. Despite his best efforts, a wind squall allowed the schooner to escape. In this last action, he suffered a fractured thigh bone; for that injury he received a pension.

In command of the cutter Pioneer, he made several seizures of smuggled goods between March 1819 and June 1820. He attained the rank of Commander, in 1828. The last naval vessel on which he served and commanded, was Hyacinth, in the West Indies, from 1831 to 1832.

While in the navy, Oldrey carried to Africa—presumably aboard Hyacinthe—an African sharif, Abu Bekr al-Siddiq, variously misidentified at the time as "Abou Beehn Saduky", "Abon Becr Sadika" or "Abu Bekr es Siddik". He had been found living as an enslaved person in Jamaica, under the slave name of Edward Donlan or Dolan. He was freed after his high level of scholarship and literacy in Arabic was identified by a magistrate. Once in Africa, he provided information on the geography and routes of his homeland. Abu Bekr al-Siddiq is notable as an author of a slave narrative, originally written in Arabic and then translated into English; he spoke English but could only read and write in Arabic.

Oldrey was promoted to Captain in 1838, but had not been to sea since his time aboard Hyacinthe. He had his naval pension and some savings, and emigrated to New South Wales, leaving Plymouth aboard Andromache, on 8 October 1838.

== Migration and Broulee ==
Oldrey arrived in Sydney in February 1839. He arrived at a time, when the colonial economy was booming, largely as a result of the wool and whaling industries, and a supply of cheap labour in the form of transported convicts.

=== Early Broulee ===
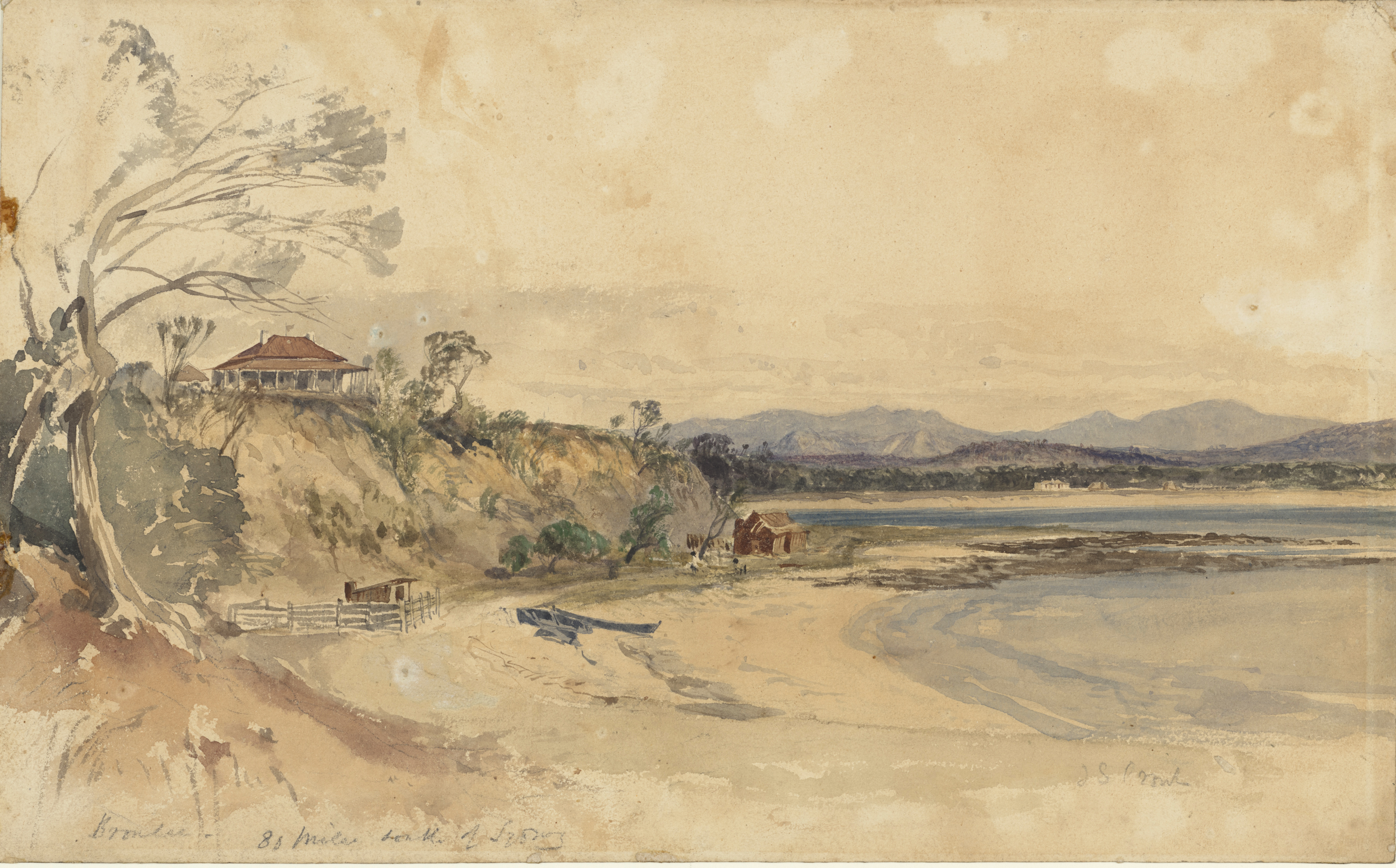
Early Broulee - 'Erin-go-Bragh' on left.

After migrating to Australia, Oldrey became a landholder around the newly established town of Broulee. He bought four large pieces of land, to the west, south and north-west of the new town. His land almost surrounded the town, except that in the north (including modern-day Mossy Point) was a large block owned by the Sydney merchants Hughes & Hosking. Oldrey also bought some blocks within the settlement itself. He built a house on his land, about two miles west from the settlement, which he called 'Mount Oldrey'. Oldrey also had other small landholdings in the colony. In 1840, he was a shareholder of the Australian Steam Navigation Company.

Broulee, at the time, was a new, very remote settlement, in which the rule of colonial law was barely established, which lay near the southern boundary of the Nineteen Counties. It was only accessible from the sea, but for some rudimentary tracks linking it to other places on the coastal plain, and to the Corn Trail and a trail through the valleys leading to Araluen, two routes that linked it tenuously to the newly-settled Southern Tablelands, around Braidwood. A postal connection with Braidwood, via the Corn Trail, was established in 1839.

The town plan and allotments of Broulee were laid out by James Larmer in 1839. The purpose of the new settlement was as a seaport for the surrounding hinterland, including the valley of the Moruya River. The river mouth was obstructed by a large sandbar, resulting in a shallow dangerous entry. Goods were transshipped at the safe anchorage at Broulee, to and from smaller vessels that could cross the sand bar. Crossing the river bar was often extremely hazardous. When Larmer had surveyed the new settlement, he had stated that Broulee "appears not to possess .. any favourable feature for the formation of a town". Broulee had a safe anchorage, but neither very fertile land nor sufficient freshwater. Much of the produce loaded at the safe anchorage came from the more fertile land, around the Moruya River. Bringing it from there necessitated use of small vessels in the open sea, a hazardous practice. Nonetheless, by 1840 Broulee had six buildings and a population of 46, most of whom were convicts assigned to Oldrey.

Oldrey became the settlement's most prominent citizen, and was appointed as the local magistrate, in 1839. In the earliest times, Oldrey's residence 'Mount Oldrey' was used as the temporary courthouse.

As the earliest settlement in the region, Broulee became the administrative center with a court house, store and post office. A hotel, 'Erin-go-Bragh', was erected and licensed in 1843, in the part of the town that stood on Broulee Island, and overlooked the anchorage.

On 30 January 1844, the hotel was the scene of a bizarre assault involving, John Hawdon, J.P., a settler at Kiora, and a local magistrate—Oldrey was another local magistrate—who entered the hotel's bar on horseback. Hawdon, assisted by three other men—Hawdon's brother-in-law, Mr Potts, another local magistrate from Ulladulla, Mr Wason, and the Clerk-of-the-Bench, Mr McLean—attacked Oldrey's former superintendent, Richard Bingham Sheridan. The case could not be properly investigated nor tried, at Broulee, as the defendant was one of the local magistrates at Broulee, and the closest bench at Braidwood refused to become involved. Sheridan doggedly persisted in seeking justice, and Hawdon was eventually tried and found guilty, by a jury, in the Supreme Court, nearly a year later. The strange episode appears to have been triggered by an argument, about money, between Oldrey and Sheridan at 'Mount Oldrey', earlier on the same day, and may have been related indirectly to Oldrey's insolvency which occurred around that time.

The settlers, at and around Broulee, were not the original inhabitants; the area lay on the traditional lands of Walbanga people, a group of the Yuin. In those early days, the local people were still occupying their land, although the granting of title deeds to settlers like Oldrey was extinguishing what would later become known as native title.

In October 1841, the schooner Rover was wrecked at Broulee. Oldrey's boat was away at Batemans Bay and could not be used for the rescue. Some lives were saved by four local Yuin men, the constable, the innkeeper, and two other men who were in Oldrey's employment (one described as 'government men', and so probably an assigned convict). The government did not reward the local Yuin people for the courageous rescue, but Oldrey, who seemed to enjoy good relations with them, personally rewarded them with gifts, including a number of breastplates. The breastplates, among other inscriptions in English, carried the works "Bale me jarrad" (I'm not afraid) and an engraved illustration of a sailing vessel. The breastplate of "Jenny, Queen of Broulee" survives from around this time. As the local magistrate, Oldrey had responsibility for the annual distribution of blankets to the surviving Yuin, and complained that the government supplied these in insufficient numbers.

=== Speculative land boom and route from the inland ===
Landholders in the area, such as Oldrey, were relying on the growth of the port and its population. There was a short-lived land boom at Broulee and at the new townships established, at least on land survey plans, on Jervis Bay. Oldrey was trying to sell or rent farmland in the Broulee area from, at latest, December 1840. Prospective buyers of land could visit Jervis Bay and Broulee aboard a steamer, Sophia Jane, in October 1841. As a major landholder, Oldrey was heavily exposed to the fate of Broulee.

The land around Broulee itself was not particularly fertile. Although there was good land in the region, particularly in the valley of the Moruya River, it was not nearby the new township of Broulee. The land that Oldrey had bought around Broulee was relatively infertile, and even his better land was marginal. Another problem for the new settlement was the inadequate supply of freshwater.

In 1842, after The Wool Road was completed, Oldrey and others, including Major William Sandys Elrington and Terence Aubrey Murray, attempted to raise funds for a rival private road, from Bellalaba to Broulee, Such a road would have connected the area south of Braidwood, and perhaps as far away as Queanbeyan and the Limestone Plains, to Broulee as their seaport. It seems uncertain now exactly how the route ascended the coastal escarpment. All that is known for certain is that the road was have followed part of a cart route blazed by Charles Nicholson, from Broulee to the Monaro, in 1841; Nicholson had shifted half a ton of tobacco from Broulee to the Monaro, in fourteen days, over his crudely made cart route, and was planning to return, carrying six bales of wool.

The apparent failure of the Wool Road, with its port of South Huskisson, provided Oldrey with a window of opportunity to make Broulee the seaport for the Southern Tablelands and the Monaro. The proponents of the 'New South Road' envisaged that Broulee would have a jetty and store-houses for wool and other produce.

Although the road was never built, from around 1842, Broulee had become a port at which coastal ships called regularly to carry cargoes and passengers. A regular caller at the port was the coastal steamer, Shamrock, en route to and from Port Phillip.

=== Bankruptcy, and the end of the port at Broulee ===
Nature would help thwart, Oldrey's plans. In 1841, a huge flood on the Moruya River, washed away the sandbar at the mouth of the river, making the river navigable, up to what would later become a newer settlement at Moruya. Steamships, which could navigate the river, would become more common. There was then less reason for a port at Broulee. The dangers of bringing produce from the river to the port at Broulee, by sea in small vessels, could then be avoided. However, the practice initially persisted, with a fatal incident as an outcome, in late 1842.

New South Wales entered an economic depression in the 1840s and, in 1843, there were a number of bank failures. Grand plans, such as Oldrey had for Broulee and roads to the inland, became too risky to contemplate and finance dried up. A number of prominent citizens found themselves insolvent, including Oldrey, who was made bankrupt in January 1844. After the sale of his property and possessions, he was in deficit by £1,616.5s.7d. He moved to Sydney, probably around the end of 1845, aboard the steamer, Shamrock, which still called at Broulee.

The fate of Broulee was sealed by the establishment of a town and river port at Moruya around 1850. Still a minor port, Broulee became a very quiet place, known by the 1850s as 'Oldrey's Folly'. There was brief revival, when the old port was used by gold miners in the rush to the Araluen in the 1850s.

The building of the Erin-go-Bragh Hotel was pulled down and, in 1860, reassembled at Moruya. Later, the court moved there too. In 1873, storms washed away the sand spit that joined Broulee Island to the mainland, greatly reducing the safety of the anchorage at Broulee. In the 1920s, a jetty with a small tramway was built on the island, and used to ship shell grit, on a small scale. After that, Broulee then resumed its slumber, until it revived as a holiday destination later in the 20th century.

== Later life, marriage, family, and death ==
Oldrey lived for the last years of his life at Port Macquarie, on the Mid North Coast of New South Wales. In his later years he was described as, "the same warm hearted old fellow", but it was also said about him, "Good nature, shortsightedness as to his men and long credit ruined him".

On 30 August 1849, he married Jane Catherine Brown (née Byrne), the much-younger 23 year-old widow of Captain William Brown, captain of Royal Sovereign, at the military barracks at Port Macquarie. The marriage was by 'special licence', indicating that there was some unusual or controversial aspect of the connection between Jane and William. A daughter, Victoria Jane Blanch, was born to the couple.

Oldrey died at Port Macquarie, on 29 December 1851, and was buried there. After he died, his son, Edward William Oldrey, was born in February 1852, but the son died, aged two, and was buried in Camperdown Cemetery. His wife died, aged 53, in Sydney, in April 1881, and lies in Waverley Cemertery.

== Legacy ==
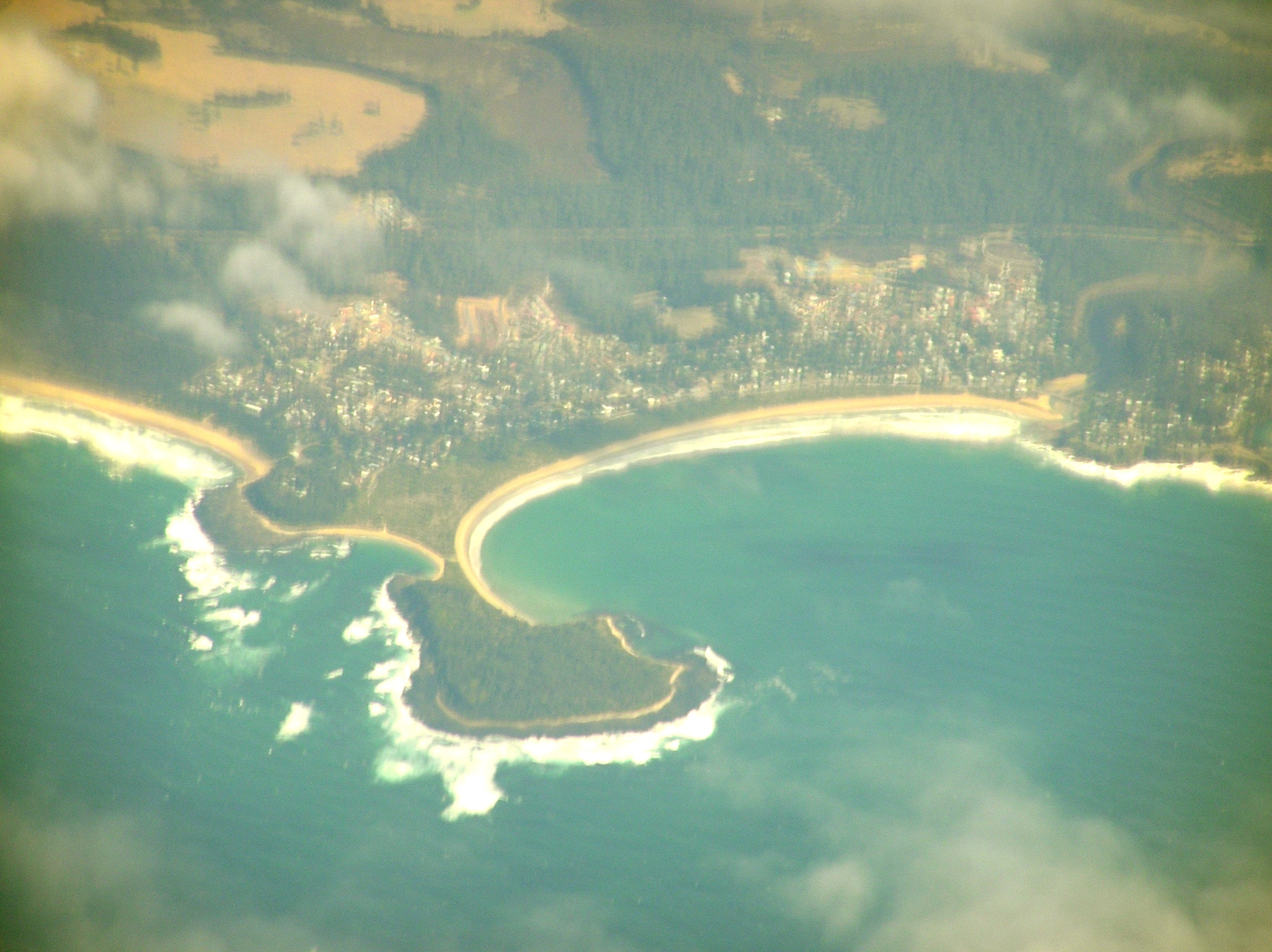
Modern-day Broulee from the air. 'Mount Oldrey' was on the cleared land in the left background.

Oldrey is remembered for the early days of Broulee. A park there, Captain Oldrey Park, is named after him. There was a street named for him in the ghost town of Currowan, on the Clyde River, and also a 674m mountain in the Clyde Range, with a "conspicuous round summit", rising from the Buckenbowra Valley, known as Mountain Oldrey.

With continuing high recent rates of population growth, the seaside village of Broulee is at last extending its urban footprint, over part of the land that Captain Oldrey hoped to sell for profit in the 1840s. The part of the original Broulee that lay on the island, where the hotel was, has reverted to its natural state and is now Broulee Island Nature Reserve; all that remains of that part of the early settlement is a lonely grave on the island. The sand spit reformed, during the 1980s, connecting the island once more to the mainland at high tide. Safe once again, the anchorage is occasionally used by yachts.

It seems that Oldrey's old homestead, 'Mount Oldrey', may have survived, in some form, until after 2012, but now only its site exists.
