= Rosedale, New South Wales =

Rosedale
- Town
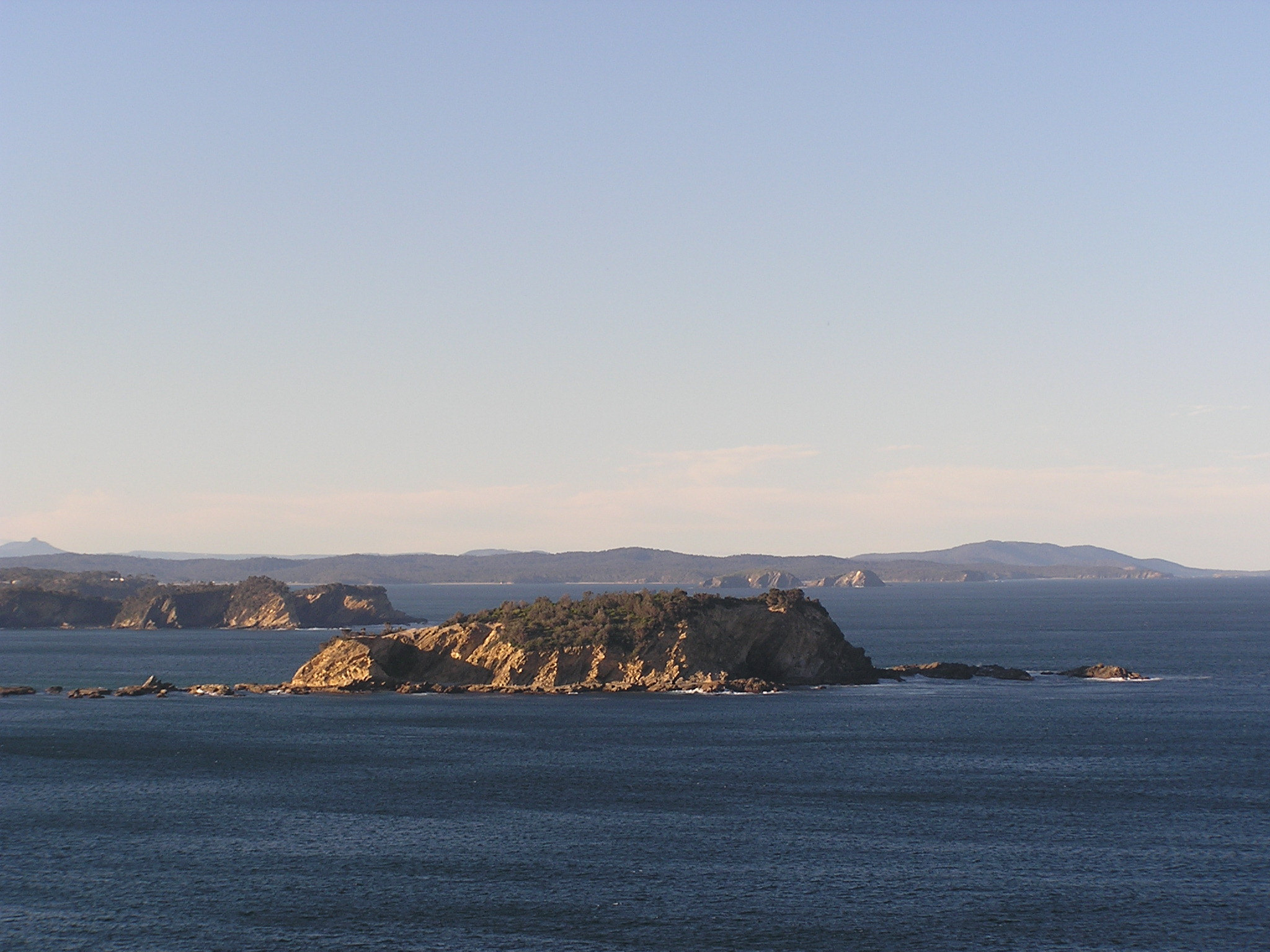
- Jimmy's Island offshore from Rosedale, photo taken from Burrewarra Point

- Coordinates: 35°49′S 150°13′E
- Country: Australia
- State: New South Wales
- LGA: Eurobodalla Shire

Government
  - State electorate: Bega
  - Federal division: Gilmore

Population
  - Total: 221 (2016 census)
- Postcode: 2536
Localities around Rosedale
Mogo	Malua Bay
Tomakin	Rosedale	Tasman Sea
	Guerilla Bay

Rosedale is a beachside settlement in New South Wales, Australia. It is on the south coast, about 18 kilometres by road south of Batemans Bay. The area is administered by the Eurobodalla Shire. At the 2016 census, Rosedale had a population of 221.

== History ==
The material in this section is derived from a brief history of Rosedale, written by Ian Harrison and published in the Rosedale Association newsletters of January 2004 and March 2004

There was clearing of bush at South and North Rosedale for grazing. There were very few buildings in Rosedale prior to the second world war. In the 1950s the council approved a subdivision plan by Miller, a builder, in which many blocks were below 600 m². However, notwithstanding this subdivision, Rosedale is one of very few seaside settlements in Australia where the bush is more prominent than the buildings.

=== Farming in the nineteenth century ===
The Rosedale valley includes portions 11, 12, 32, 81, 98, 118, 213, 214, 215 and 221 in the Parish of Bateman, County of St Vincent. Land intended for settlement was usually marked in 40-acre (16 ha) lots due to the then official view that this was an area suitable for sustaining a living. Portions 11 and 12 were taken up by Thomas Hollands in 1878, while John Hollands was granted portion 32, also straddling the creek but further west, in the same year. However, there is no evidence that either man settled in the area.

Rosedale Farm was first settled by James Sebbens, while the western end of the valley was settled by Karl Thomsen. Both men cleared the bush to establish their farms.

The father of James, also called James Sebbens was born in Essex in 1814. He was transported as a convict on the ‘John Barry’ in 1838 and was assigned to serve his time at Broulee. He received his certificate of freedom in 1848. In 1851 he married Celia Ann Barlings. Celia had arrived at Broulee from England with her parents in 1832 at the age of four years. The Sebbens family lived in the Tomakin area on a property called Oaks Ranch, southwest of Candlagan Creek. They had 14 children. James Sebbens died in 1876 and is buried at Moruya. His widow married Henry Rose (1820–1906), who is buried at Mogo.

Cecilia’s father, Richard Henry Barling, who was a free overseer, formalised his conditional purchase of portion 5 in 1852. Portion 5 is now the site of the Barlings Beach caravan park.

Joseph Sebbens, the eldest son of James and Cecilia, operated a steam mill at Malua Bay in the latter part of the 1800s with the help of his brother, William. This mill had been originally set up at Tomakin by a Robert Jennings in 1874 but was salvaged and moved by Joseph after Jennings abandoned it in the 1880s.

James Sebbens (junior), born 1858, cleared and developed Rosedale and parts of Burri/Guerilla Bay. His wife's brother (maybe father?), Karl Thomsen, cleared all of portions 32, 213 and 221.

A surveyor's report of 1884 noted that there was 2 acres (0.81 ha) of cleared land, 38 acres (15 ha) of land with ring barked trees, and a house. Sebbens cleared all the land in portions 81, 214, 215 and most of 98, although it is not clear whether he cleared right to the cliff edge at what is now called North Rosedale. While significant regrowth has occurred, particularly during the last decades, the distinction in tree height and density can be seen.

From 1870 to 1908 the Sebbens family developed a farm of 700 acres (280 ha). They owned 430 acres (170 ha) and occupied but had no title to 285 acres (115 ha) of the land they farmed. They were mainly dairy farmers producing cheddar cheese. A set of old bails remains from this period near the creek downhill from the present farmhouse.

The farmhouse burnt down in the late nineteenth century. The present day farmhouse was constructed from two existing houses.

In 1908 the Sebbens family sold to Herman Nibbe and moved to western Sydney where they farmed poultry. At the time of the sale the property was consolidated into one title under freehold with all the conditional purchase areas being converted.

=== Twentieth-century developments ===
Nibbe had tried to farm sheep as well as maintaining production of cheddar. In financial difficulty he sold the property in 1913 but continued to farm under lease until 1921. Horace Benjamin O’Neil purchased the farm in 1921. The farm was starting to become less productive as the soils were not good and became depleted once the trees were cleared.

The first car in the district was an International Motor Buggy purchased in 1908 by Adolf Thomsen, a grazier at Tomakin. (The car is still owned by a Batemans Bay family.) The development of better transport through the availability of motor cars opened up the area.

== Rosedale Association and the Keep Australia Beautiful NSW awards ==
Rosedale has an active association that was established in the early 1970s. Recent achievements include willing regional and state honours in the 2003 NSW Clean Beach Challenge, organised by Keep Australia Beautiful NSW. Rosedale was also awarded a highly commended certificate in the Natural Heritage Award (regional). An award was also received in 2004.

The 2003 citation reads:

‘Rosedale Beach, just south of Malua Bay, is a comparatively small beach which is notable for the great rock formations along the beach and headlands and the position of Jimmies Island, which also offers some protection against southerlies. When the water level is high enough, Saltwater Creek flows into the ocean at the northern end of the beach. At the time of inspection, there was not enough water to flow out of the lagoon and into the ocean. Despite this, the creek/lagoon is healthy and appeared to be a haven for wildlife.

‘The beach is pretty much surrounded by the village of Rosedale, which is separated from the beach by a small reserve. Rosedale is a typical holiday village, with the population more than doubling during summer. The community is very dedicated to maintaining the quality of their beach, which forms a major part of their lives. There is an historic community boat shed at the northern end of the beach, which has been in existence since the thirties and which is maintained in good repair by local boat owners.

‘Locals are motivated to try and stabilise the fore dune of the beach after some major erosion damage caused by storms some years ago. With this aim, there has been an extensive program of environmental weed control and revegetation with natives, which has been fairly successful. A major part of this work has been the encouragement of the whole community to lend a hand to undertake the work.’

Our judge stated, ‘The level of community involvement, along with partnerships between Landcare and council, in restoration and maintenance work at the beach is very impressive indeed. There is a regular newsletter which goes out to local residents (including the "part-time" residents), and this helps both educate the community and coordinate clean-up and Landcare efforts. The level of attendance at regular beach clean-ups and working bees is also astounding, getting up to 70 per cent of the local population (and in summer, includes many of the "part-time" residents). The locals ability to motivate even the nonpermanent resident holiday home owners to participate in helping keeping a clean and healthy beach is nothing short of amazing. The fact that residents decided that they wanted a regular monthly activity is a testament to the success of the Landcare/Residents’ Groups education efforts.’

== Batemans Marine Park ==
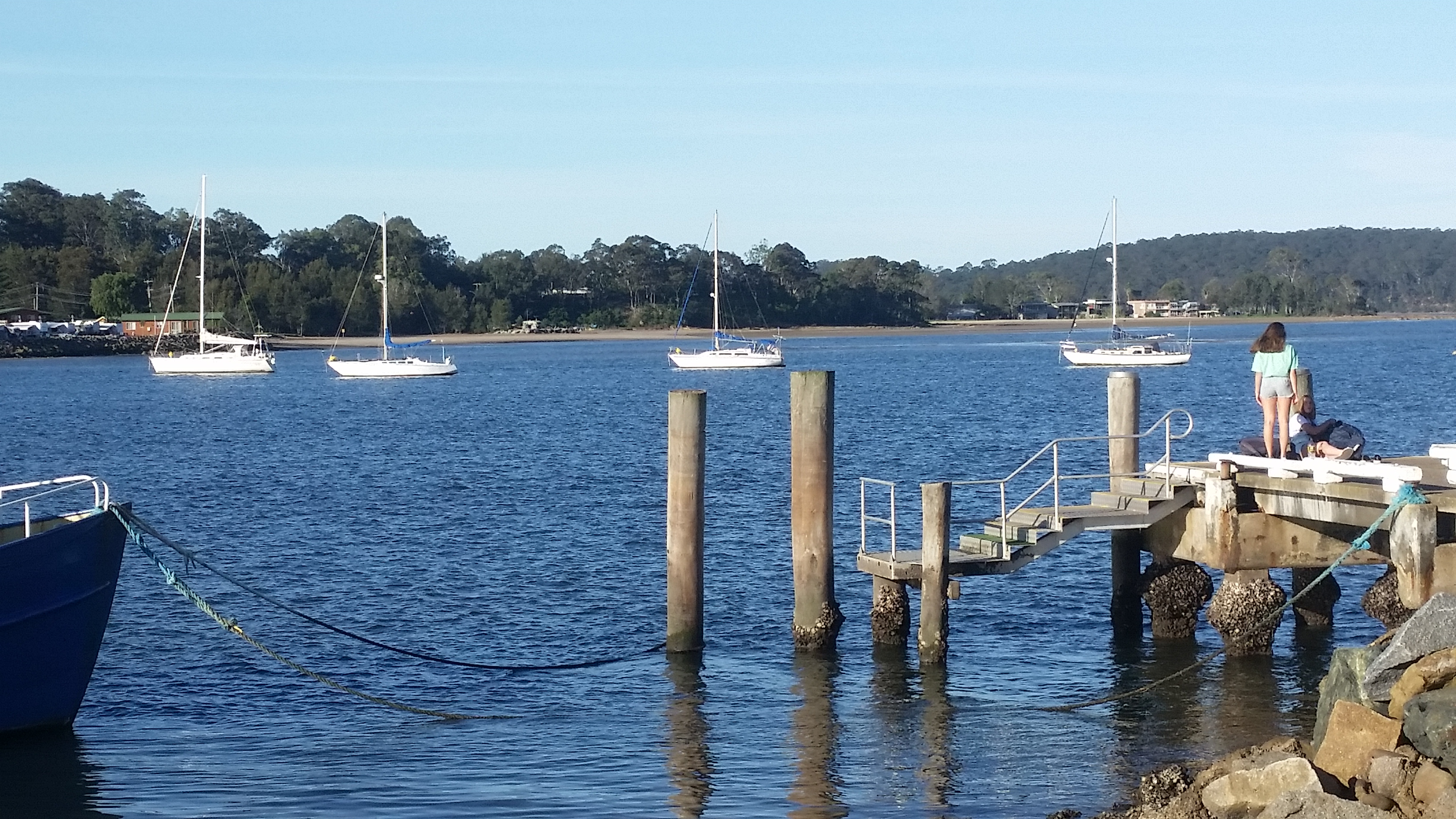
Batemans Marine Park in 2017

Batemans Marine Park was established on 30 June 2007 and encompasses all waters at Rosedale. The waters split into two zones commencing at a north-east position on the rock ledge at the southern headland, with the boundary line extending eastwards along latitude 35⁰ 49.030", via the north-east tip of Jimmies Island to a longitude 150⁰ 14.341" position at sea.

The Habitat Protection Zone extends northwards from the boundary line along Rosedale's beaches and coves, McKenzies Beach, Pretty Point and on past Batemans Bay to Wasp Island at Durras South. Minor restrictions apply to Recreational fishing and major restrictions on Commercial fishing in the Habitat Protection Zone.

The Burrewarra Point Sanctuary Zone which includes Jimmies Island, commences south of the boundary line and extends around to Nuns Beach, Tranquil Bay, Guerilla Bay, around Burrewarra Point to Long Nose Point. All Recreational and Commercial fishing is prohibited in the Sanctuary Zone (there was an Amnesty for Recreational line fishing from mainland ocean beaches and headlands, with an exclusion area around Burrewarra Point that operated from March 2013 to December 2014). The Burrewarra Point Sanctuary Zone is a breeding ground for grey nurse sharks (critically endangered).

== Nature walks ==
The Rosedale - Guerilla Bay Circuit is a popular walking track starting at the southern end of Tranquil Bay Place, Rosedale and ending up at Guerilla Bay. Highlights of the walk include possible sea eagle and cockatoo sightings, crossing Nuns Beach, and views of Jimmies Island and Guerilla Bay.
