= Tomakin =

- Town
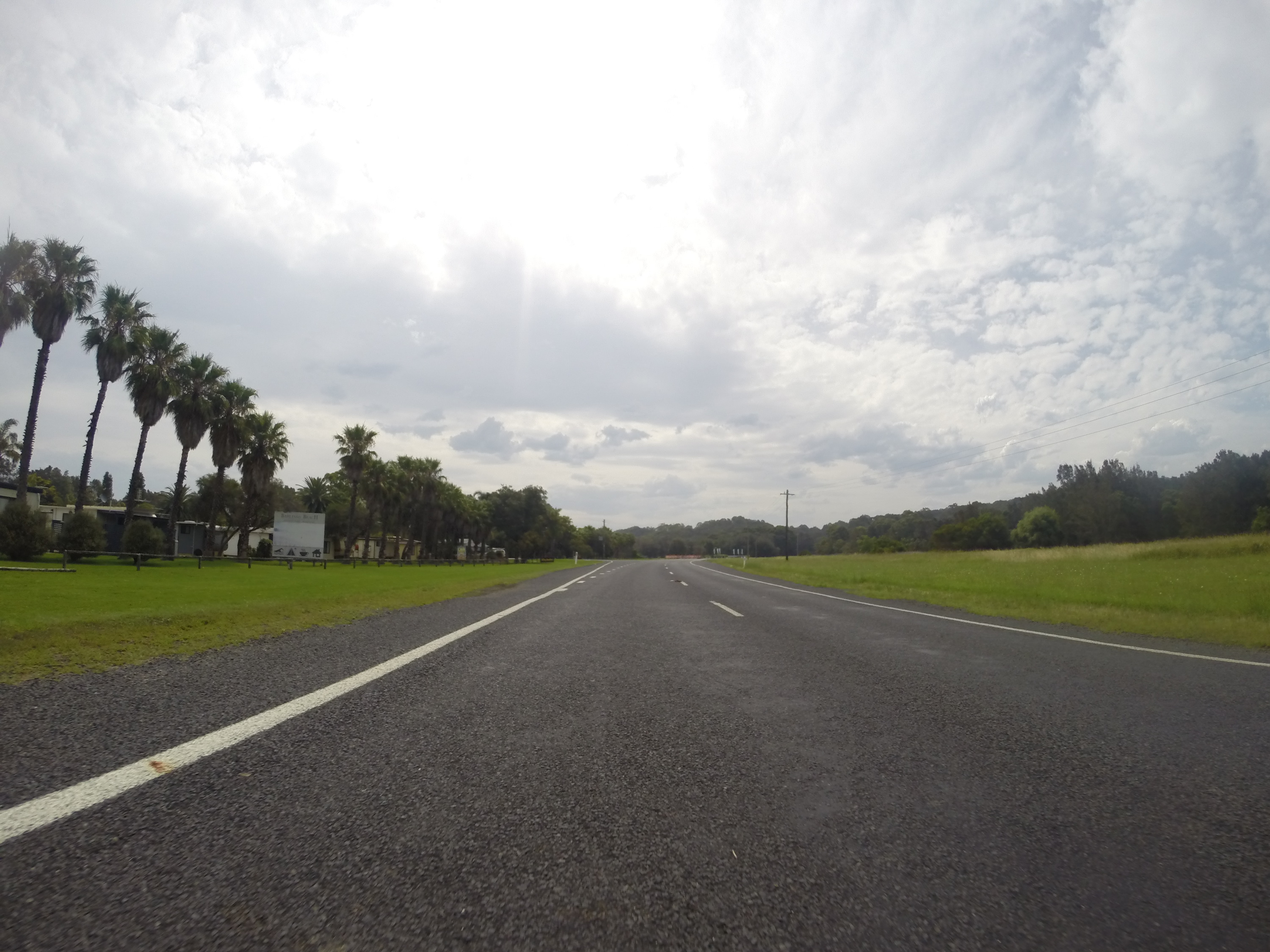
- George Bass Drive, Tomakin

- Coordinates: 35°50′S 150°10′E
- Country: Australia
- State: New South Wales
- LGA: Eurobodalla

Government
  - State electorate: Bega
  - Federal division: Gilmore

Population
  - Total: 1,233 (SAL 2021)
- Time zone: UTC+10 (AEST)
  - Summer (DST): UTC+11 (AEDT)
- County: Dampier
- Parish: Bateman
Localities around Tomakin
Mogo	Woodlands	Rosedale
Jeremadra	Tomakin	Guerilla Bay
Mossy Point	Mossy Point	Tasman Sea

Tomakin is a small seaside village on the south coast of New South Wales between the major towns of Batemans Bay and Moruya. At the 2021 census, the town had a population of 1,233. It is most closely flanked by the other small villages of Guerilla Bay and Mossy Point (adjacent to Broulee which is separated by the Candalagan Creek).

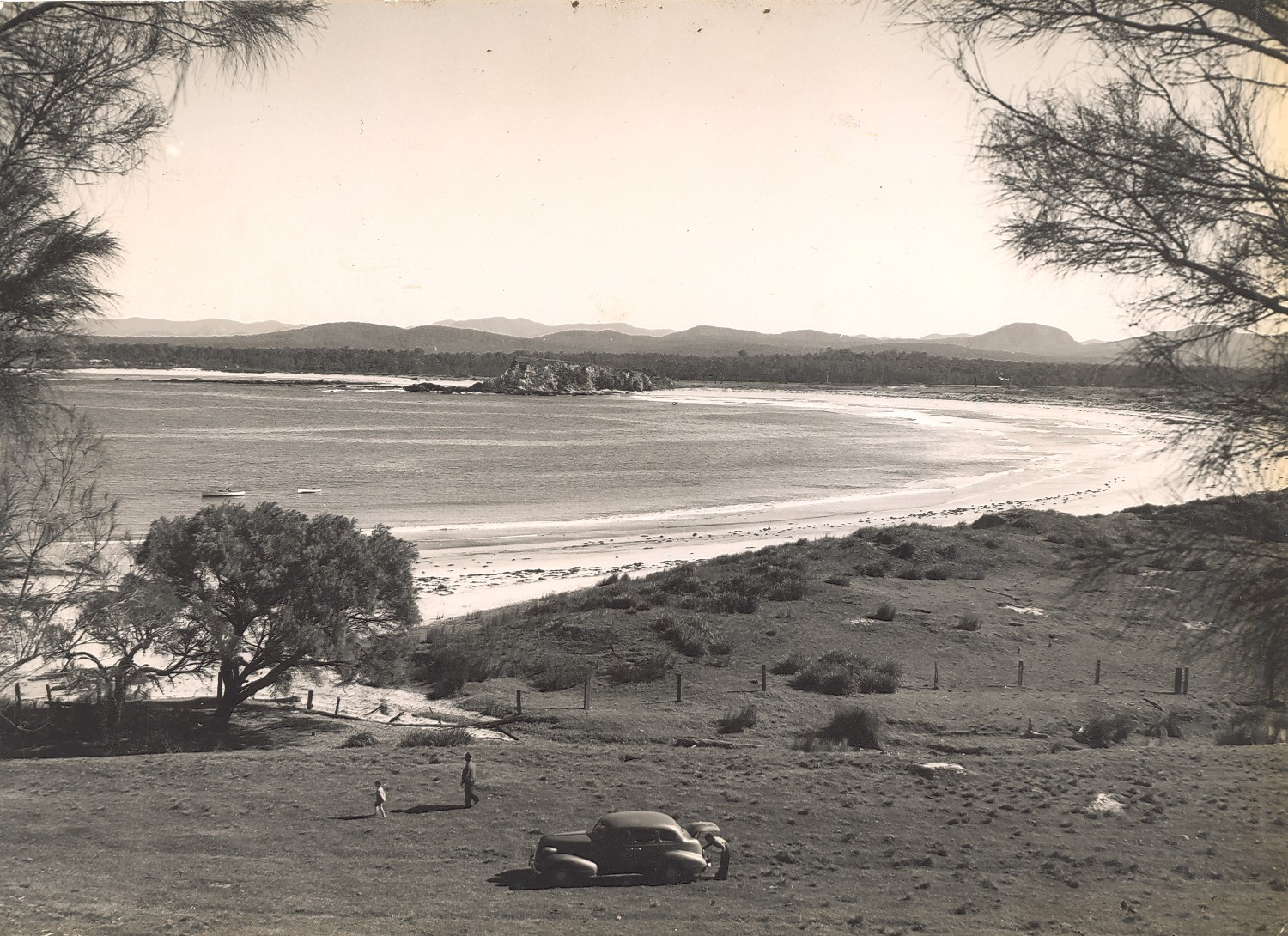
Barlings Beach at Tomakin circa late 1930s.

The town is located at the mouth of the Tomaga River. It has a boat ramp which, along with another boat ramp at Mossy Point, provides access to the Pacific Ocean.

== Tourist attractions ==
There are three caravan parks with on-site vans and cabins available. There are other accommodation options including bed and breakfast establishments and holiday cottages for rent.

Activities in the area include surfing, swimming, wind and kite surfing, fishing (beach, river, rock, estuary, ocean), kayaking, stand-up paddle boarding, walks and bicycling.
