= Abu Bakr al-Siddiq (enslaved man from Timbuktu) =

Abu Bakr al-Siddiq (also Edward Doulan) was an Islamic scholar from Timbuktu. He was enslaved in his early twenties in the city of Bouna (in today's Ivory Coast). He wrote his autobiography, a slave narrative, in Arabic; two copies (one in Jamaica, one near London) were made and translated into English, and published in 1834.

Abu Bakr al-Siddiq was the son of a well-to-do merchant and traveler, who went to Bouna to seek gold. Abu Bakr was educated as an Islamic scholar in Jenne after his father died in Bouna during his business travels. After his father's death, Abu Bakr visited his grave his tutor. While they were living there, war broke out; Adrinka, Sultan of Bondoukou, had killed the Sultan of Banda, and extended the conflict to Bouna, which his army overran. In the subsequent chaos Abu Bakr was captured and enslaved. He was made to carry a load down to the Atlantic Coast, where he was sold to Christians, and after three months arrived in Jamaica. A pair of letters at the end of his narrative relate how he was set free by his owner, Alexander Anderson, and given his "English name" as Edward Doulan.

== See also ==
- William Oldrey
