= Brau =

Brau may refer to:

- Brau people, a Bahnaric people from Laos，Cambodia and Vietnam
- Brao language, spoken by Brau people
- Braone, an Italian commune also known as Braù in Camunian dialect
- Brau Holding International, German brewing corporation

People with the surname Brau:

- Edgar Brau, Argentine writer, stage director and artist
- James C. Brau (born 1968), American economist
- James E. Brau (born 1946), American physicist
- Mariano Brau (born 1982), Argentine footballer
- Salvador Brau (1842 –1912), Puerto Rican writer, historian, and sociologist

== See also ==
- Brou (disambiguation)
