= Jeremadra =

- Town
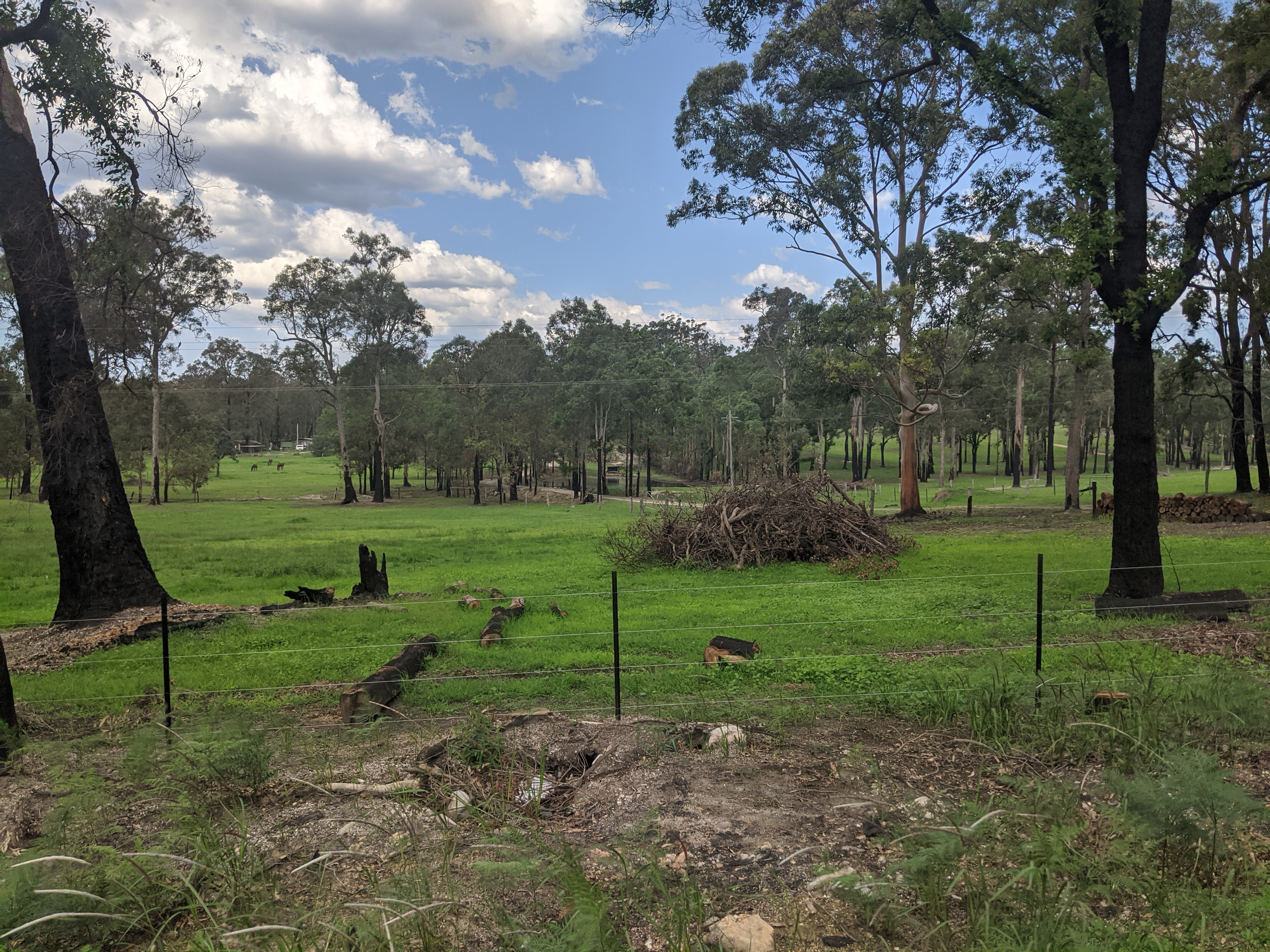
- Jeremadra from Princes Highway

- Coordinates: 35°49′25″S 150°09′25″E
- Country: Australia
- State: New South Wales
- Region: South Coast
- LGA: Eurobodalla Shire
- Location: 15 km (9.3 mi) N of Moruya; 290 km (180 mi) S of Sydney; 165 km (103 mi) SE of Canberra

Government
  - State electorate: Bega
  - Federal division: Gilmore

Population
  - Total: 187 (SAL 2021)
- Postcode: 2537
- County: St Vincent
- Parish: Tomaga
Localities around Jeremadra
Mogo	Mogo	Mogo
Mogo	Jeremadra	Tomakin
Bimbimbie	Broulee	Mossy Point

Jeremadra is a locality in Eurobodalla Shire, New South Wales, Australia. It lies on and to the east of the Princes Highway, about 15 km north of Moruya and 290 km south of Sydney. At the 2021 census, it had a population of 187.
