= Congo, New South Wales =

Congo
- Town
- Coordinates: 35°57′S 150°09′E
- Country: Australia
- State: New South Wales
- Region: South Coast
- LGA: Eurobodalla Shire
- Location: 315 km (196 mi) SSW of Sydney; 10 km (6.2 mi) SE of Moruya

Government
  - State electorate: Bega
  - Federal division: Eden-Monaro

Population
  - Total: 245 (2016 census)
- Postcode: 2537

Congo is a village in Eurobodalla Shire on the South Coast of New South Wales. Congo is located 315 km south of Sydney, and 10 km south of Moruya.

The population of Congo and the surrounding area was 245 at the 2016 census.

Congo Creek flows to the Tasman Sea at the northern end of the village. Congo's beach is noted as a good location for surfing, with a colloquial name "The Suck". Beach safe classes the hazard of the unpatrolled Congo beach as 6/10 "Moderately hazardous".

== National parks and Aboriginal heritage ==
Congo is a village surrounded by Eurobodalla National Park on three sides, and the ocean (Tasman Sea) on the east.

Congo campground is situated on Congo Creek within the national park. It is a good base for walking the 14 km Bingi Dreaming track described by the National Parks and Wildlife Service as "a coastal walk that traces the ancient Song Lines of the Yuin Aboriginal people".

Aboriginal people have occupied the area for over 6000 years, prior to the sea reaching current levels.

Eurobodalla Coast Tourism notes that the Congo area was a major source of silcrete, used to make stone tools. Silcrete was widely traded throughout the region.

== Wildlife ==
Eurobodalla Shire Council reports that the greater glider is endangered, and has been recruiting residents to undertake spotlighting as part of the Bingie Congo Glider project.

== Land use and planning ==
A small area on Congo Creek may be affected by rising sea levels.

A parcel of land on Congo Creek at the north of the village has been identified as Endangered Ecological Community "25 South Coast Swamp Forest - Casuarina glauca".

Outside the village and national park, Eurobodalla Shire Council's planning map shows land classified as agricultural class 1-4 and 5.
