= Abernethy and Co Stonemason's Lathe =

Specific tool listed as a heritage item in Australia

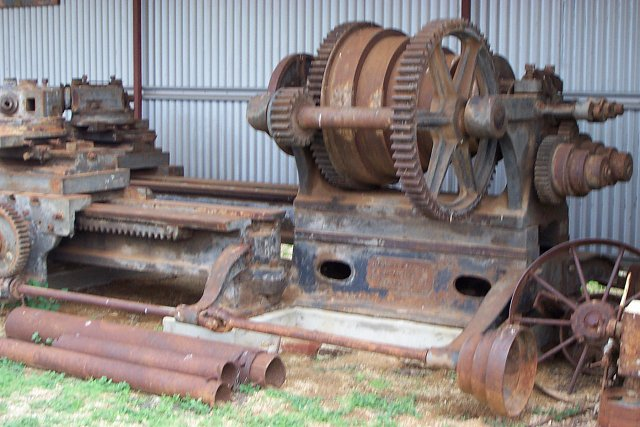

- Location within New South Wales Location within Australia
- 35°54′44″S 150°04′46″E
- Location: Moruya and District Historical Society 85 Campbell Street, Moruya, Eurobodalla Shire, New South Wales, Australia

History
- Built: 1881

Site notes
- Owner: Office of Environment and Heritage

New South Wales Heritage Register
- Official name: Abernethy and Co Stonemason's Lathe
- Type: State heritage (movable / collection)
- Designated: 2 April 1999
- Reference no.: 942
- Type: Industrial Objects (movable)
- Category: Manufacturing and Processing
- Builders: J. Abernethy & Co Aberdeen

The Abernethy and Co Stonemason's Lathe is a heritage-listed former stonemason's lathe on public display in Moruya, on the South Coast of New South Wales in Australia. It was built during 1881 by J. Abernethy & Co, Aberdeen. The property is owned by the Office of Environment and Heritage, an agency of the Government of New South Wales. It was added to the New South Wales State Heritage Register on 2 April 1999. It is currently maintained by the Moruya and District Historical Society, located at 85 Campbell Street, Moruya.

== History ==
This twin bed lathe was made in 1881 at Aberdeen by J. Abernethy and Co. and brought to Sydney where it was used to turn columns for the Sydney GPO, The Queen Victoria Building and for the granite pedestal for the Queen Victoria statue in Queen's Square, Sydney. It was last in use at Loveridge and Hudson's Yard in Sydney in the 1960s.

It was given by Mr Ted Hudson to the Lachlan Vintage Village at Forbes and disposed at auction in May 1987. It was subsequently repurchased by the Heritage Council of NSW and ownership transferred to the Minister for Planning under the NSW Heritage Act 1977. The lathe was reassembled at the Lachlan Vintage Village, Forbes, following recognition of its significance. In 1999, the lathe was transferred to the State Heritage Register under the Act.

The Heritage Council resolved at its 4 November 2009 meeting to recommend that the Minister:

- acting as a corporation sole under section 102 of the NSW Heritage Act 1977, transfers title of the Abernethy Stonemason's Lathe from the corporation sole to Eurobodalla Shire Council.

The Abernethy Stonemason's Lathe is the only moveable item of its type known to have survived in Australia. The item is currently owned and managed by the Minister for Planning under the Heritage Act 1977. Eurobodalla Shire Council has approached the Heritage Branch, NSW Department of Planning, to obtain the item for public display at Moruya. Council has also indicated its willingness to obtain legal title to the lathe in perpetuity, from the Minister for Planning, to assist their active care and long term management of the item. The Heritage Branch has identified this action as being beneficial to the long-term care, display and public enjoyment of the lathe.

Eurobodalla Shire Council has obtained planning permission to display the item in a public outdoor setting adjacent to the Moruya Historical Society building near Campbell Street, Moruya. Transfer of the item will require later Heritage Council approval under section 57 and/or section 60 of the Act. Under the Heritage Act, transfer of an item of environmental heritage from the control of the Minister and the corporation to another party requires the recommendation of the Heritage Council of NSW under section 116(2). The Heritage Council agreed to recommend the disposal of the item at its meeting of 4 November 2009. The Minister wrote to Eurobodalla Council in March 2010 to formally transfer title.

Records indicate that the lathe was last used at Loveridge & Hudson's Yard in Sydney in the 1960s. It is unclear whether the Lathe was ever situated near the main source of granite at Moruya, or whether it was always located in Sydney. The Moruya Antique Tractor and Machinery Association (MATMA) suggests that a collection of historic photographs show the Lathe situated at Louttit's quarry, Moruya, at one stage.

For many years the lathe was in limbo its last known use was at the stonemasonry firm of Loveridge and Hudson in Sydney during the 1960s.

Loveridge and Hudson was registered in 1882, just after the lathe's construction. Whether they ordered it or had it shipped it to Australia is unknown. The company records are now lost.

The lathe is however attributed to turning the stone columns for some of Sydney's most majestic buildings. The extension of the Sydney GPO in the 1880s, the Queen Victoria Building (1898), Circular Quay railway station (early 1900s), and the Martin Place Savings Bank (1925), amongst others. At this time, suggestions are that the lathe was based in Sydney.

It is unknown whether the lathe spent its entire working life in Sydney. There is some evidence that it had once been at Louttit's Quarry on the banks of the Moruya River. We do know that it turned Moruya granite and we know that by 1977 the Sydney company of Loveridge and Hudson had donated it to the then growing Lachlan Vintage Village in Forbes, an Old Sydney Town-type heritage village. The lathe was in Sydney at that time. Here its fortunes were a little more certain, until the village owners sold it to a local scrap metal business a decade later in 1987. Heritage enthusiasts including the Department of Public Works and the National Trust, lamented the lathe's loss.

Bob Carr, then Minister for Heritage, placed an Order over the historic monument that year under the Heritage Act. The Heritage Council under its then Chair Justice Hope stepped in and purchased it and it was given a stay of life in the Village grounds.

With Lachlan Vintage Village's verging on collapse, the lathe was once again in jeopardy. Calls to remove it were made from 1991. The relocation of the lathe to Moruya in May 2010 was made possible by the coming together of key community members and the local Council to rescue this important part of New South Wales' industrial heritage. Local groups recognised the importance of this item to the local area and were instrumental in starting the dialogue to get the lathe relocated.

The role of the Heritage Council has been instrumental in the preservation of the lathe, having saved it from scrapping in the 1980s and later recommending to the Minister that it be transferred to Eurobodalla for final display and protection.

== Description ==
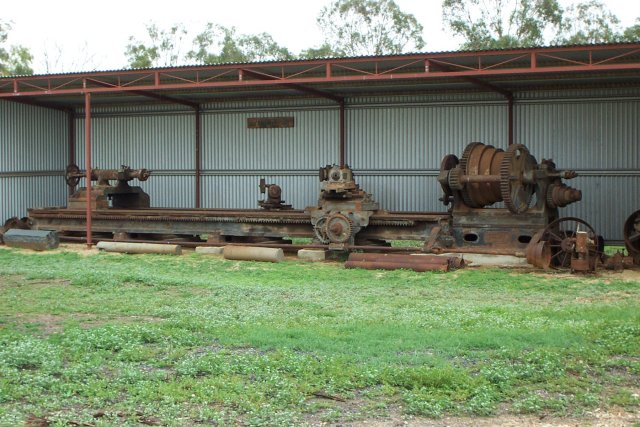
Abernethy & Co Stonemason's Lathe

A lathe for turning large stone columns. Assembled from components of cast iron with milled gears and shafts mounted on a bed of approximately 10 metres (33 ft) length with toothed rails for positioning the travelling end.

=== Condition ===
As at 9 September 2010, the lathe was substantially intact. Reassembled following confirmation of heritage status after initial dismantling. It is not presently in working order but weather protection had been provided by the Heritage Branch, NSW Department of Planning, when on display at Forbes's Lachlan Vintage Village. Relocated and reassembled in Moruya in May 2010 and undergoing conservation treatments.

Largely intact but not in working order. Reassembly may not have included functional connectors.

=== Modifications and dates ===
Reassembly completed in April 1993 by W. A. Knights Steel Fabricators & Erectors, Forbes. Moved to Forbes c. 1977 from the Sydney yard of Loveridge & Hudson, stonemasons.

Relocated from Forbes to Moruya in May 2010. Set up in new display venue adjacent to the Moruya Historical Society in Campbell Street, Moruya on land set aside by the Eurobodalla Shire Council for this purpose. Cover shed established around lathe. The Moruya Antique Tractor and Machinery Association Inc. reassembled the lathe and begun conservation treatments, including fish oil applications, on behalf of the present owner, Eurobodalla Shire Council.

== Heritage listing ==
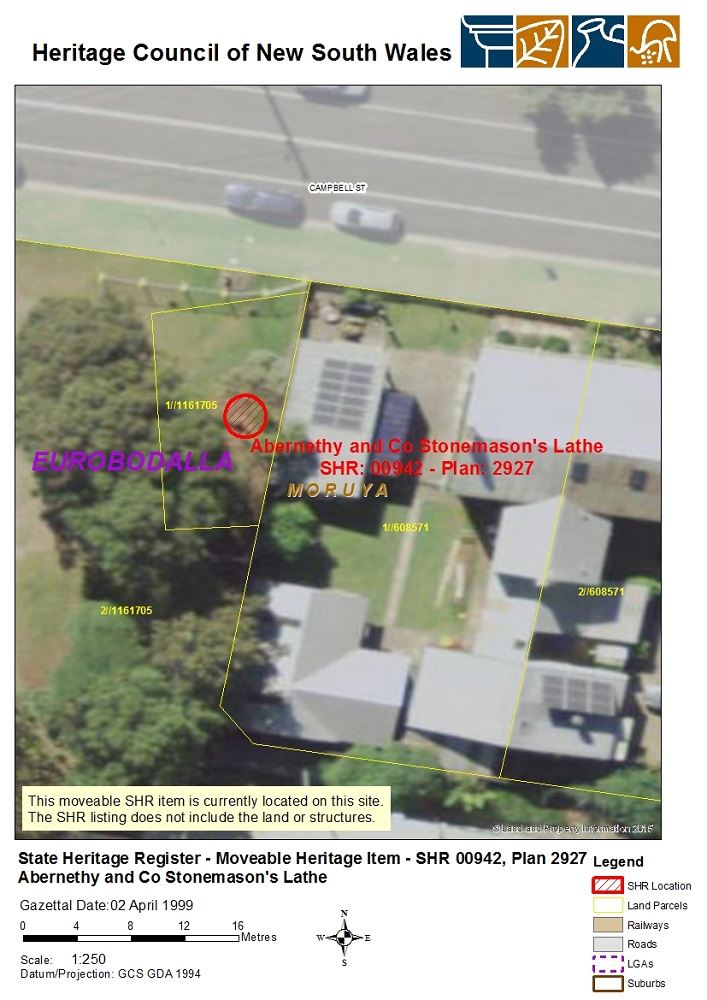
Heritage boundaries

As at 17 August 2010, it was a rare surviving piece of Victorian machinery which was in use for nearly a century, this stonemason's lathe demonstrates changes in technology and in the taste for the use of stone elements in public buildings. It is associated with many significant public buildings in Sydney of the late Victorian period including Sydney General Post Office, the Queen Victoria Building and the pedestal for Queen Victoria's statue in Queen's Square. It is rare for its size and demonstrates aspects of late 19th century toolmaking technology.

Abernethy and Co Stonemason's Lathe was listed on the New South Wales State Heritage Register on 2 April 1999 having satisfied the following criteria.

The place is important in demonstrating the course, or pattern, of cultural or natural history in New South Wales.

Associated with construction of major public works in the late Victorian period in Sydney including the Sydney General Post Office, The Queen Victoria Building and the Pedestal for Queen Victoria's Statue in Queen's Square.

The place has a strong or special association with a particular community or cultural group in New South Wales for social, cultural or spiritual reasons.

Indicative of the fluctuating preference for stone elements in public buildings.

The place has potential to yield information that will contribute to an understanding of the cultural or natural history of New South Wales.

An example of 19th century technology which survived in use for its original specialised purpose for nearly a century.

The place possesses uncommon, rare or endangered aspects of the cultural or natural history of New South Wales.

A rare surviving Victorian stonemason's lathe, possibly unique outside Europe.

== See also ==
- Machine tool – Machine for handling or machining metal or other rigid materials
