= Guerilla Bay =

- Burrewarra Point

- Coordinates: 35°49′46″S 150°13′6″E
- Country: Australia
- State: New South Wales
- LGA: Eurobodalla Shire

Government
  - State electorate: Bega
  - Federal division: Gilmore

Population
  - Total: 53 (2016 census)
- Postcode: 2536
Localities around Guerilla Bay
	Rosedale
Tomakin	Guerilla Bay	Tasman Sea
	Tasman Sea

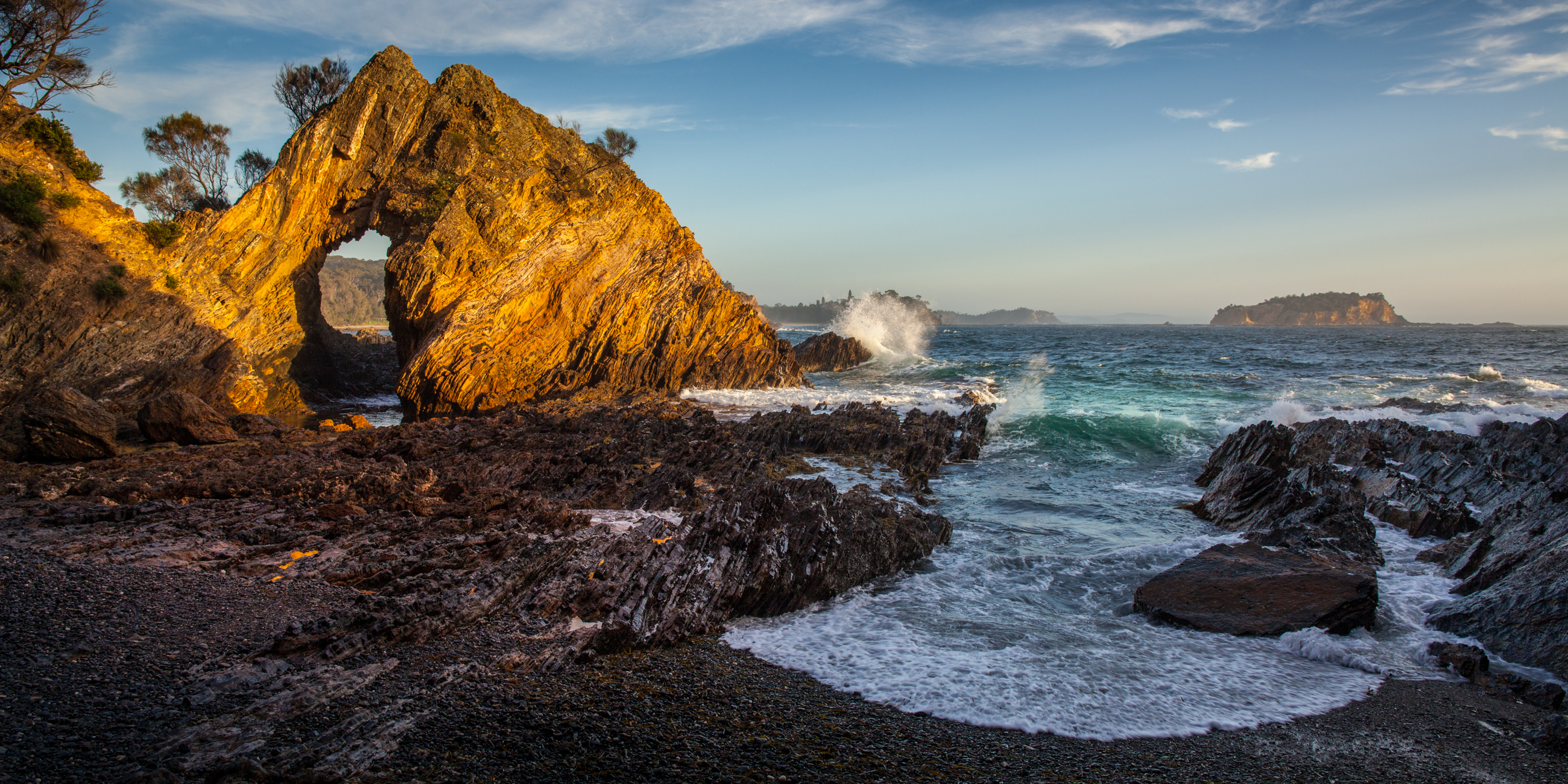
Guerilla Bay

Guerilla Bay (postcode: 2536) is a bay and village located in Eurobodalla Shire, the South Coast, New South Wales, Australia. Fishing is banned as the entire area is a sanctuary zone.

== Climate ==
Guerilla Bay experiences an oceanic climate (Köppen climate classification Cfb). The climate of Guerilla bay is moderated by the sea, with warm summers and mild sunny winters. Nights can be cold in winter. Thunderstorms mostly occur between November and March, with rainfall maximums in summer.

Climate data for Guerilla Bay
Month	Jan	Feb	Mar	Apr	May	Jun	Jul	Aug	Sep	Oct	Nov	Dec	Year
Record high °C (°F)	43.9 (111.0)	43.3 (109.9)	40.6 (105.1)	35.1 (95.2)	28.6 (83.5)	24.4 (75.9)	25.6 (78.1)	30.0 (86.0)	34.7 (94.5)	37.2 (99.0)	41.6 (106.9)	42.2 (108.0)	43.9 (111.0)
Mean daily maximum °C (°F)	25.4 (77.7)	24.8 (76.6)	23.9 (75.0)	22.0 (71.6)	19.7 (67.5)	17.5 (63.5)	17.1 (62.8)	18.2 (64.8)	21.0 (69.8)	21.7 (71.1)	22.5 (72.5)	22.5 (72.5)	21.3 (70.3)
Mean daily minimum °C (°F)	15.6 (60.1)	16.1 (61.0)	14.3 (57.7)	11.0 (51.8)	7.2 (45.0)	5.6 (42.1)	4.2 (39.6)	4.3 (39.7)	7.0 (44.6)	9.4 (48.9)	12.2 (54.0)	14.1 (57.4)	10.0 (50.0)
Record low °C (°F)	6.0 (42.8)	8.1 (46.6)	5.0 (41.0)	1.0 (33.8)	−2.0 (28.4)	−3.0 (26.6)	−4.0 (24.8)	−2.1 (28.2)	−2.0 (28.4)	−1.0 (30.2)	3.0 (37.4)	4.0 (39.2)	−4.0 (24.8)
Average rainfall mm (inches)	60.1 (2.37)	100.4 (3.95)	80.5 (3.17)	52.4 (2.06)	42.4 (1.67)	88.3 (3.48)	51.0 (2.01)	58.6 (2.31)	42.6 (1.68)	74.1 (2.92)	83.6 (3.29)	68.7 (2.70)	802.7 (31.60)
Source: Bureau of Meteorology
