= Lakeview Homestead Complex =

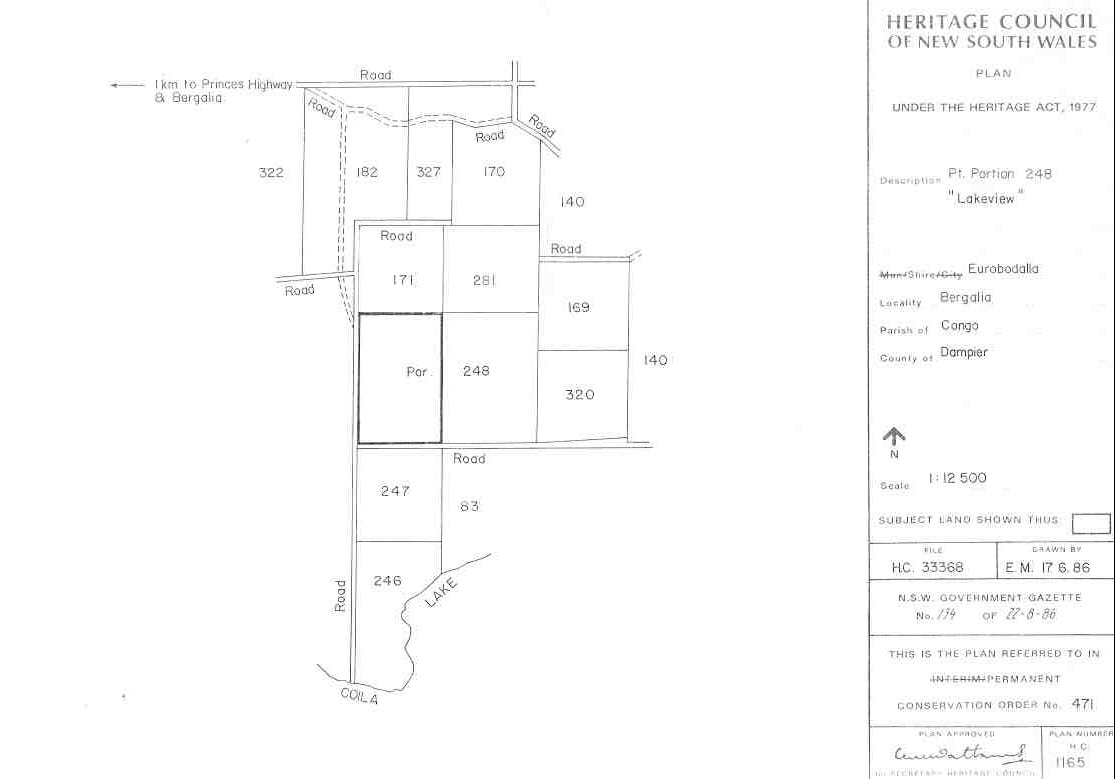
- Heritage boundaries

- Location within New South Wales Location within Australia
- 35°59′47″S 150°07′02″E
- Location: Bergalia, Eurobodalla Shire, New South Wales, Australia

New South Wales Heritage Register
- Official name: Lakeview Homestead Complex
- Type: State heritage (built)
- Designated: 2 April 1999
- Reference no.: 471
- Type: Homestead Complex
- Category: Farming and Grazing

The Lakeview Homestead Complex is a heritage-listed homestead complex at Bergalia in the Eurobodalla Shire local government area of New South Wales, Australia. It was added to the New South Wales State Heritage Register on 2 April 1999.

== Heritage listing ==
The Lakeview Homestead Complex was listed on the New South Wales State Heritage Register on 2 April 1999.

== See also ==
- Australian residential architectural styles
