= Moruya Mechanics' Institute =

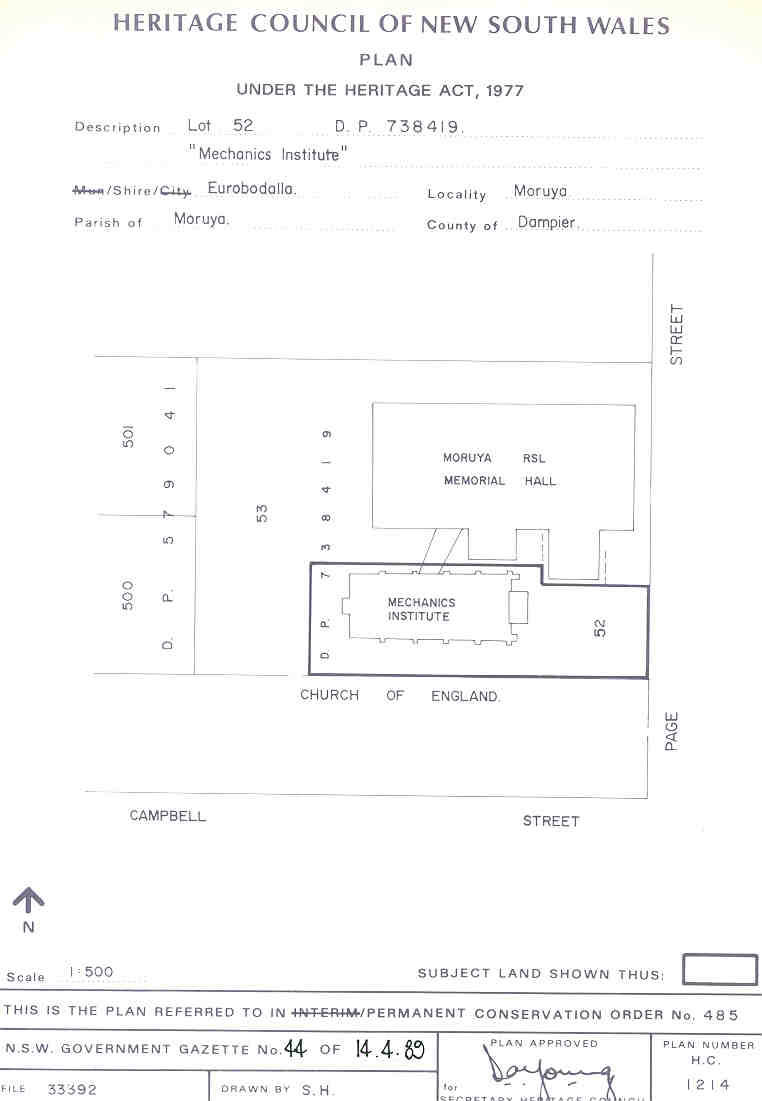
- Heritage boundaries

- Location within New South Wales Location within Australia
- 35°54′39″S 150°04′40″E
- Location: 13 Page Street, Moruya, Eurobodalla Shire, New South Wales, Australia

New South Wales Heritage Register
- Official name: Mechanics Institute
- Type: State heritage (built)
- Designated: 2 April 1999
- Reference no.: 485
- Type: Mechanics' Institute
- Category: Community Facilities

The Moruya Mechanics' Institute is a heritage-listed mechanics' institute located at 13-Page Street, Moruya in the Eurobodalla Shire local government are of New South Wales, Australia. It was added to the New South Wales State Heritage Register on 2 April 1999.

== Heritage listing ==
The Moruya Mechanics' Institute was listed on the New South Wales State Heritage Register on 2 April 1999.

== See also ==
- List of Schools of Arts in New South Wales
