= Bimbimbie =

- Town
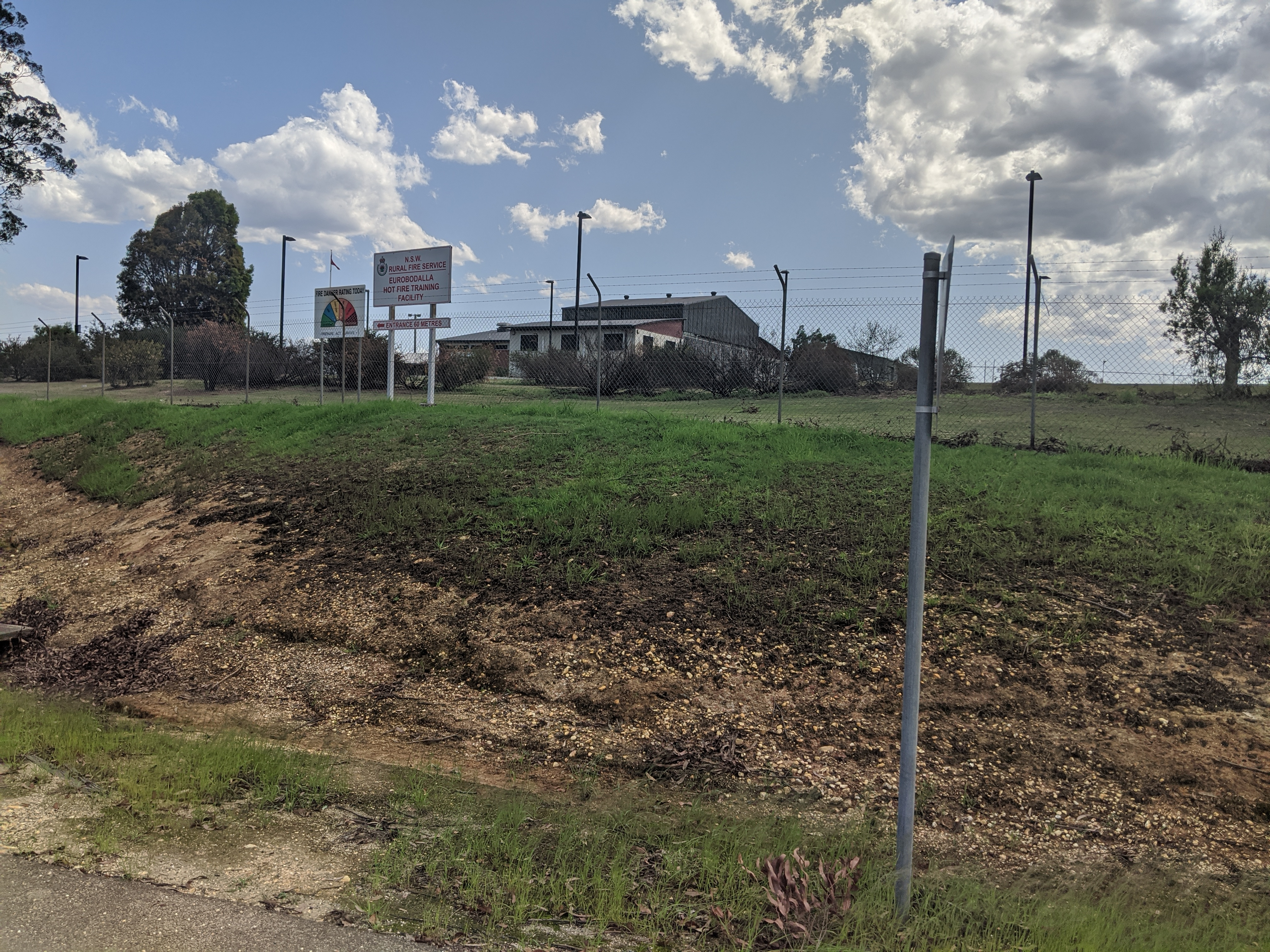
- Bimbimbie fire station

- Coordinates: 35°51′07″S 150°06′54″E
- Country: Australia
- State: New South Wales
- Region: South Coast
- LGA: Eurobodalla Shire
- Location: 11 km (6.8 mi) N of Moruya; 300 km (190 mi) S of Sydney; 170 km (110 mi) SE of Canberra

Government
  - State electorate: Bega
  - Federal division: Gilmore

Population
  - Total: 113 (SAL 2021)
- Postcode: 2536
- County: St Vincent
- Parish: Tomaga
Localities around Bimbimbie
Mogo	Jeremadra	Jeremadra
Mogo	Bimbimbie	Jeremadra
Moruya	Moruya	Broulee

Bimbimbie is a rural locality in Eurobodalla Shire, New South Wales, Australia. It lies to the west of the Princes Highway, about 11 km north of Moruya and 300 km south of Sydney. At the 2021 census, it had a population of 113.

Bimbimbie had a state school, described as a "provisional school", between January 1899 and May 1902. It reopened as a half-time school in April 1907, but closed in March 1909.
