= Broulee, New South Wales =

Broulee
- Town
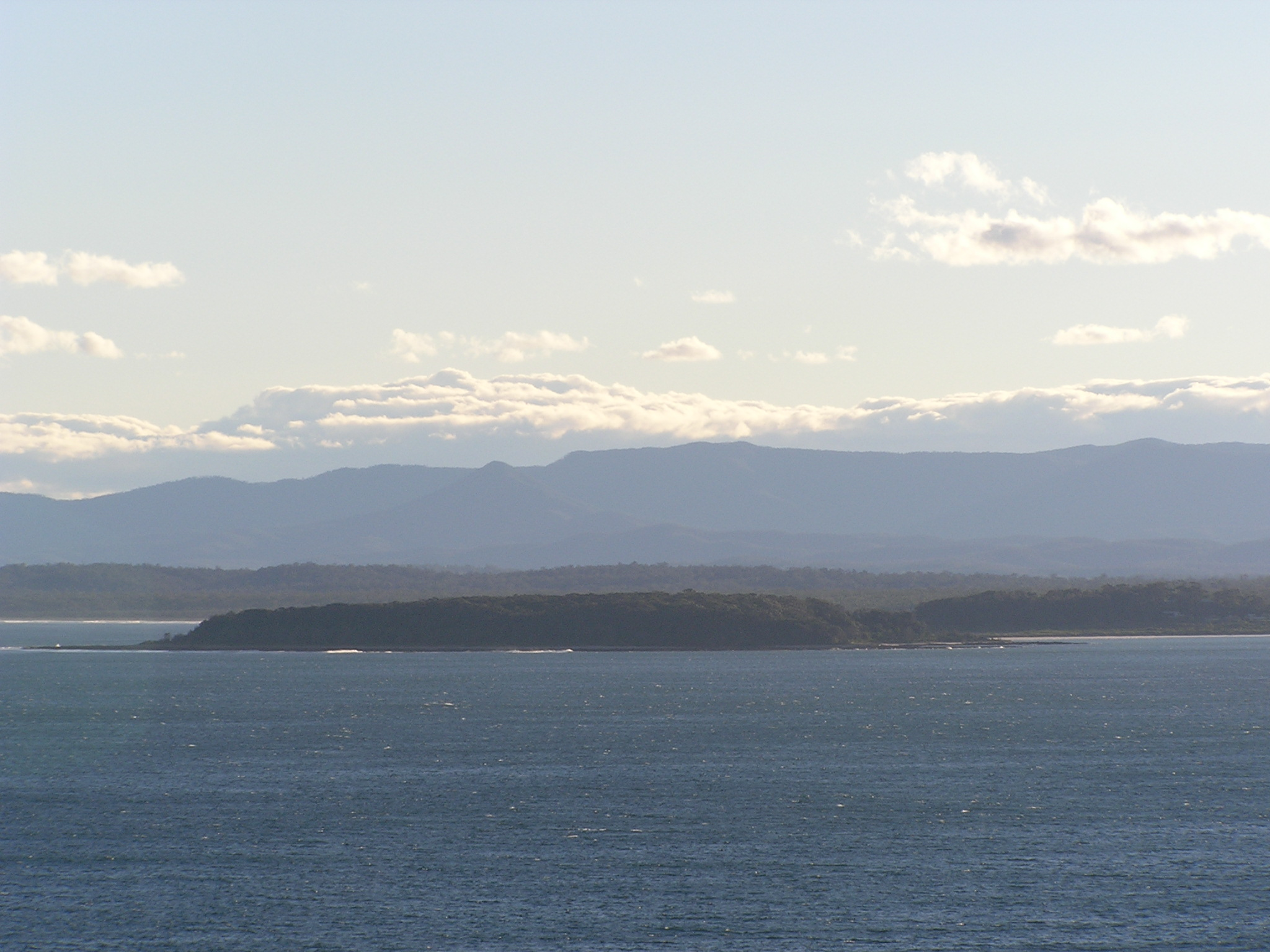
- Broulee Island looking south from Burri Point

- Coordinates: 35°51′26″S 150°10′44″E
- Country: Australia
- State: New South Wales
- LGA: Eurobodalla Shire

Government
  - State electorate: Bega
  - Federal division: Gilmore

Population
  - Total: 1,947 (SAL 2021)
- Postcode: 2537
- County: Dampier
- Parish: Broulee
Localities around Broulee
| Jeremadra | Jeremadra | Mossy Point |
| Bimbimbie | Broulee | Tasman Sea |
| Moruya | Moruya | Tasman Sea |

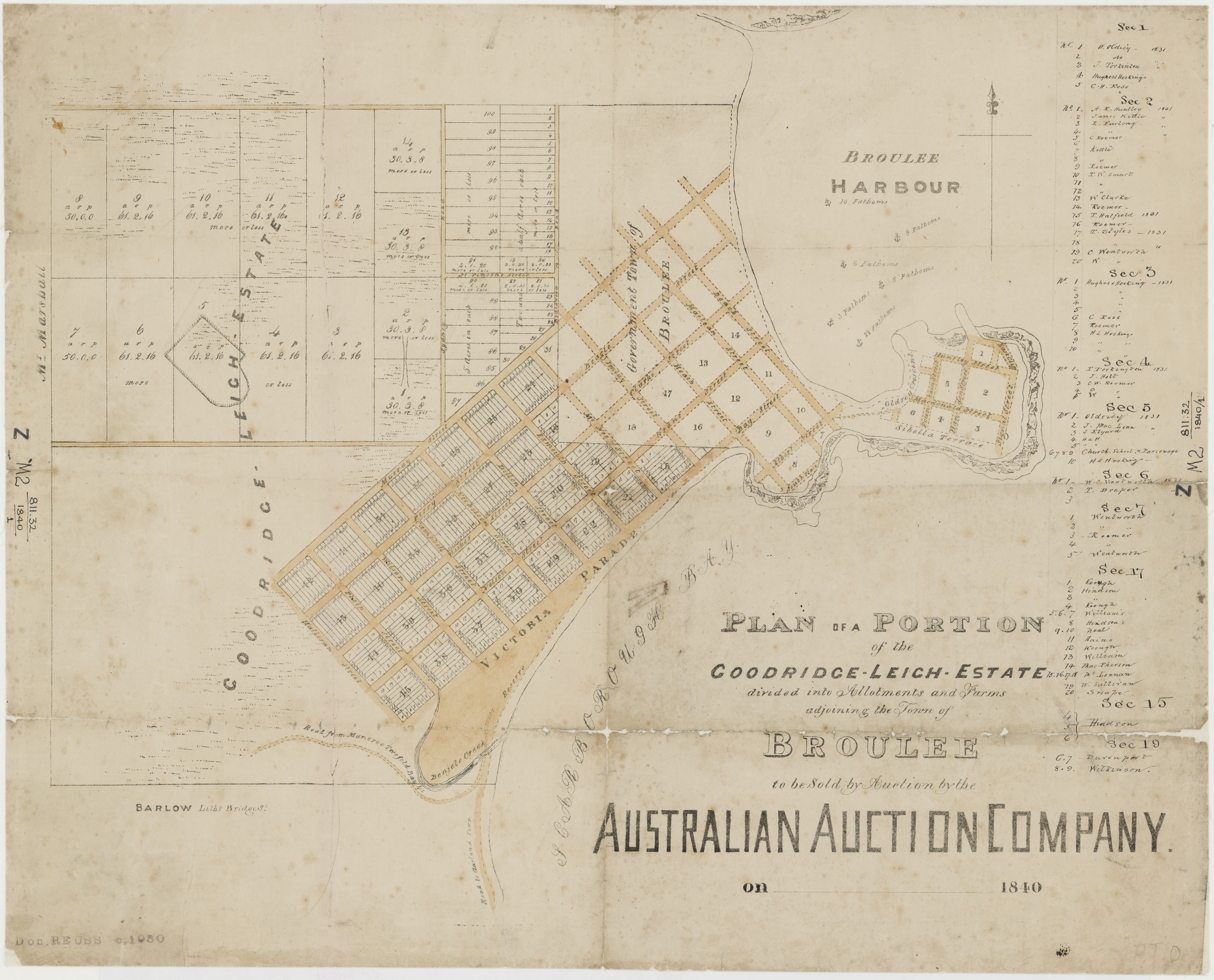
Broulee, plan of a portion of the Goodridge - Leigh Estate, 1840

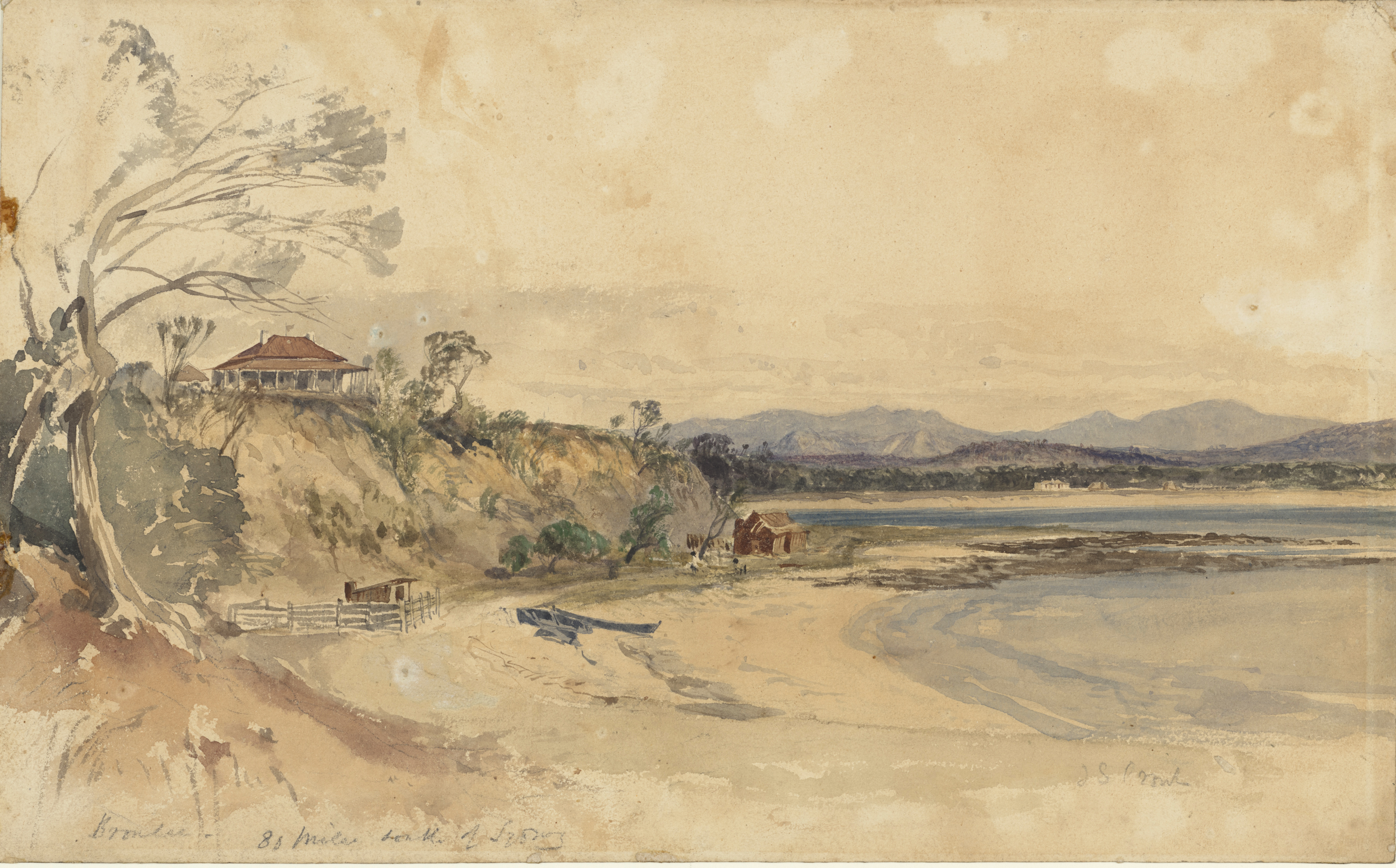
Broulee, south of Sydney, 1845 (attrib.), by John Skinner Prout

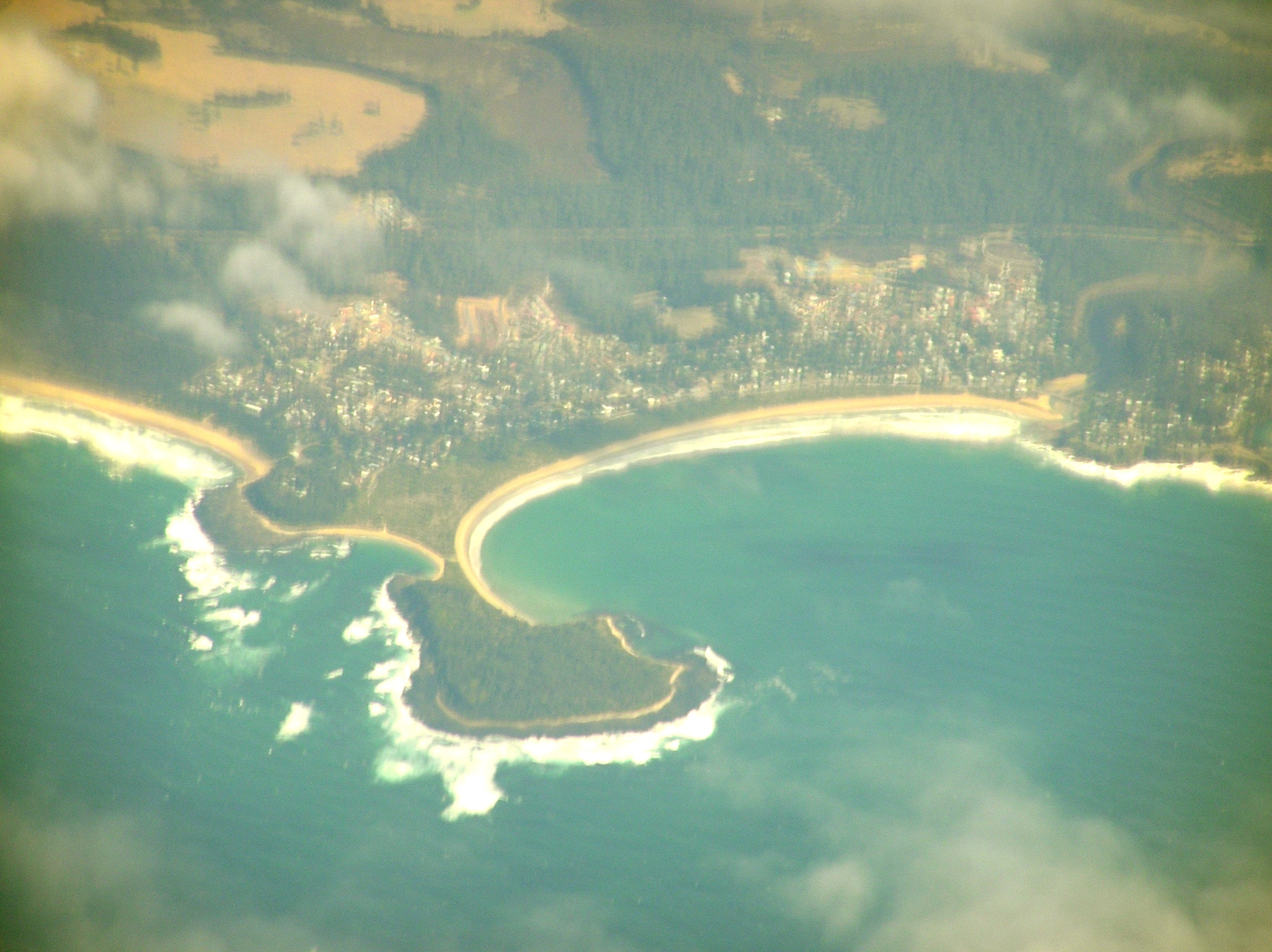
Broulee aerial photo from east

Broulee is a town on the south coast of New South Wales between Batemans Bay and Moruya. At the 2016 census, the town had a population of 1,717. Just off the beach is Broulee Island, currently joined to the mainland, but in past years the connecting spit has been covered by water, at times a very deep navigable channel with a strong current.

The first harbour in the area south of Batemans Bay was established at Broulee behind what is now known as the island. Although settlement had already commenced on the shores of the nearby Moruya River, it was not easily navigable due to a sandbar at its mouth.

== History ==
The Walbunja clan of the Yuin tribe have been traditional custodians in the Broulee area for thousands of years.

The Broulee area was surveyed and gazetted in 1837, a town plan made by James Larmer in 1839, and land sales commenced in 1840. At that time a post office was opened with mail being delivered each week over the mountains from Braidwood. Henry Clarke took up farming in the Broulee area in the 1840s after emigrating from Ireland. The first court in the district was established also in 1840 and in 1841 Broulee was made the centre of a police district which covered the area from Jervis Bay to Eden, New South Wales.

Captain William Oldrey was an important early settler of Broulee, and a magistrate.

In 1841 a flood washed away the sandbar at the mouth of the Moruya River. Land up the river was for sale from 1848 and the Moruya town site surveyed in 1850 and the town gazetted in 1851. That year gold was discovered at Araluen inland from Moruya and near Braidwood. The road from Moruya to Araluen became the preferred route and the functions that had been at Broulee shifted to the growing town of Moruya.

In 1859 the court, including the building, was relocated to Moruya. The building of the Erin-go-Bragh Hotel was also shifted from Broulee Island to Campbell St, Moruya. The inn building was first used as a store and later became the storekeeper's home. The building was demolished in 1978 as part of the development of the new Eurobodalla Shire offices. Footings of the inn building can still be seen on the island to this day.

Broulee harbour was lost in 1873 as removal of vegetation for an access road on the land spit eroded the spit and isolated what is now known as Broulee Island. In the last decades of the twentieth century, the spit or tombolo has reformed.

== Landmarks and townships ==
There is a lighthouse on Burrewarra Point to the north of Broulee.

The southern beach has a Surf Lifesaving Club with facilities including toilets, accessed from a road below the headland. There is also a boat launching ramp here, but weather conditions need to be right. There is no police station, the closest being Moruya. The Rural Fire Service has a volunteer station. There are a number of schools in the area, the largest being St Peters Anglican college catering for years Kindergarten to Year 12.

Captain Oldrey Park is the home of the Broulee Soccer Club, the ground is shared by the Broulee Mantarays and Broulee Stingrays all age men's teams, both teams play their home games there. Along with the youth division Broulee teams.

== Tourist attractions ==
From 1972 the island has been managed as the Broulee Island Nature Reserve. There is a modern caravan park with on-site vans and cabins available. Another camping area (basic) is located at the southern end of the South Beach, adjacent to Moruya Airport and Moruya River (boat ramp). There are other accommodation options including boutique accommodation, bed and breakfast establishments, and holiday cottages for rent.

Activities in the area include Mountain Biking surfing, swimming, wind surfing, fishing (beach, rock, estuary, ocean) walks, bicycling. Vehicle touring to nearby scenic beaches and headlands is popular. There are 4WD opportunities in nearby State Forests and National Parks. In recent years, the numbers of visiting whales especially the southern right whale (may rest and stay in the area, sometimes entering into Moruya River) and humpback whales show increase in adjacent waters. Bottlenose dolphins, Australian sea lions, and sea turtles can be observed from shores as well.

Mogo is a nearby village with artists, crafts and food, as well as historic Mogo Goldfields and the Mogo Zoo. Broulee is a popular weekend destination for residents of Canberra and the Australian Capital Territory.

== See also ==
- Captain William Oldrey - an early settler of Broulee.
