= Broulee Island Nature Reserve =

Nature reserve of New South Wales, Australia

- IUCN category IV (habitat/species management area)
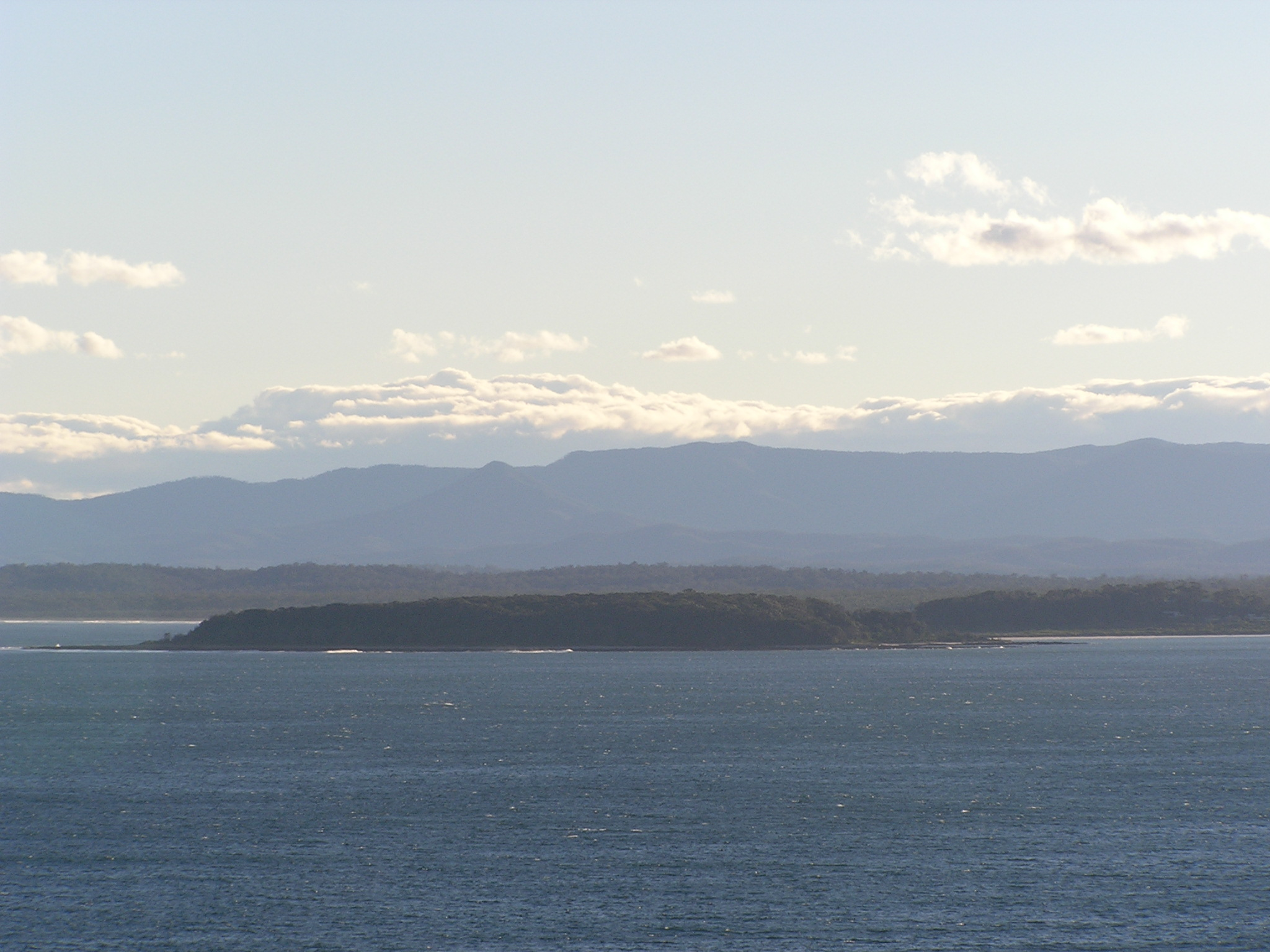
- Broulee Island looking south from Burri Point

- Location within New South Wales
- Location: New South Wales
- Nearest city: Broulee
- Coordinates: 35°51′28″S 150°11′18″E
- Area: 0.43 km^{2} (0.17 sq mi)
- Established: April 1972
- Governing body: NSW National Parks & Wildlife Service
- Website: http://www.environment.nsw.gov.au/nationalparks/parkHome.aspx?id=N0413

The Broulee Island Nature Reserve is a protected nature reserve located on the south coast of New South Wales, Australia. The 43 ha (110 acres) reserve was created in 1972 and is managed by the NSW National Parks & Wildlife Service. The reserve is situated 23 kilometres (14 mi) south of Batemans Bay and is adjacent to the village of Broulee. In the 1920s, there was a small port here from which a large amount of shellgrit was taken to Sydney, where they were made of lime and used in construction.

As of July 2008 a tombolo connected Broulee Island to the mainland at Broulee Head. Broulee Island Nature Reserve is located entirely in Eurobodalla Shire and within the boundaries of the Mogo Local Aboriginal Land Council.

Photo lovers here will enjoy views of the sea over the pristine stone pools, native plants, and the chance to catch a magnificent wren and a white-bellied sea eagle.

== Gallery ==
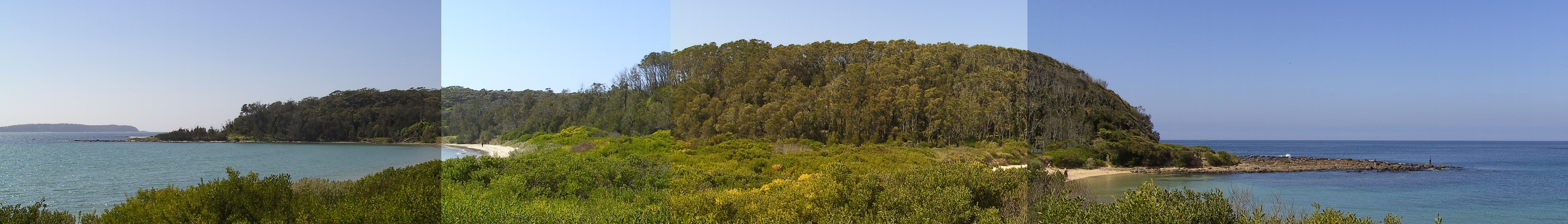
Panorama from the sand spit, looking north-east; Burrewarra Point to the left.

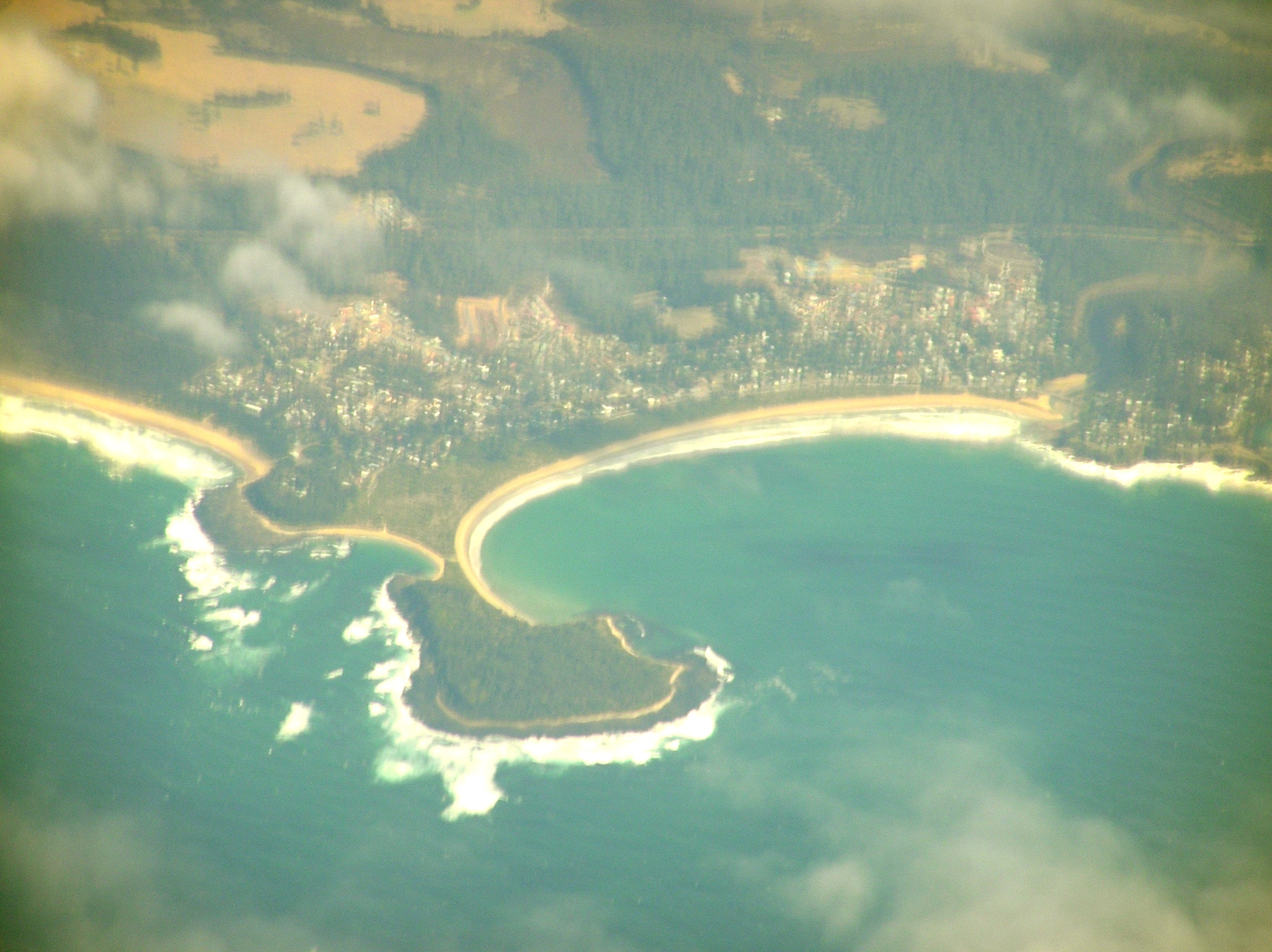
Broulee aerial photo from east

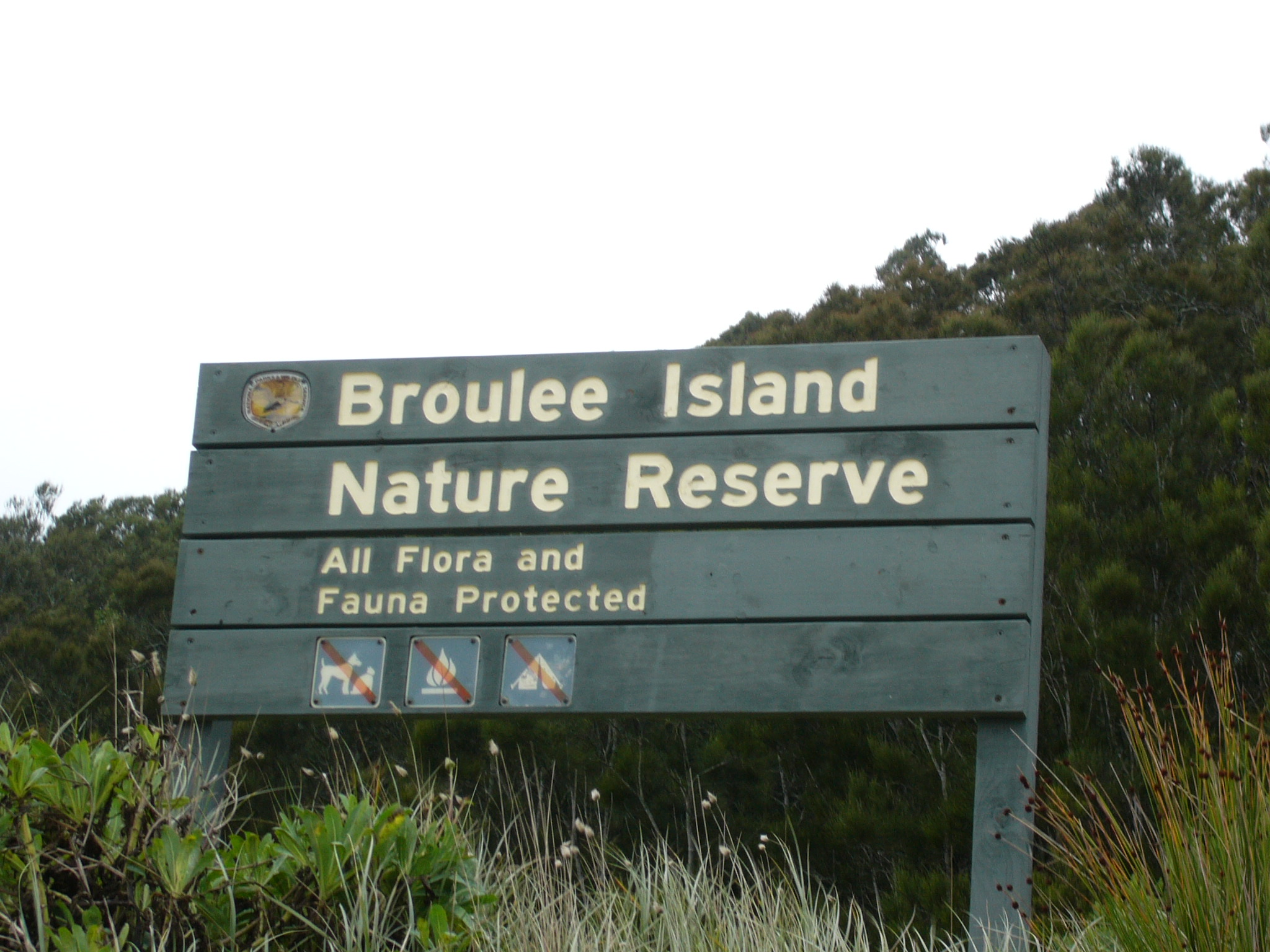
A directional sign at Broulee Island

== See also ==
- Protected areas of New South Wales
