= Eurobodalla Shire =

Coordinates: 35°55′S 150°06′E

- Local government area
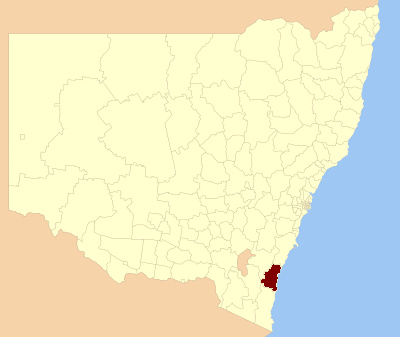
- Location in New South Wales

- Interactive map of Eurobodalla Shire
- Country: Australia
- State: New South Wales
- Region: South Coast
- Established: 17 November 1913
- Council seat: Moruya

Government
  - Mayor: Mathew Hatcher
  - State electorate: Bega
  - Federal division: *Gilmore; Eden-Monaro

Area
  - Total: 3,428.2 km^{2} (1,323.6 sq mi)

Population
  - Total: 40,593 (2021 census)
  - Density: 11.8409/km^{2} (30.6678/sq mi)
- Website: Eurobodalla Shire
LGAs around Eurobodalla Shire
Queanbeyan–Palerang	Shoalhaven	Shoalhaven
Snowy Monaro	Eurobodalla Shire	Tasman Sea
Bega Valley	Bega Valley	Tasman Sea

Eurobodalla Shire is a local government area located in the South Coast region of New South Wales, Australia. The Shire is located in a largely mountainous coastal region and situated adjacent to the Tasman Sea, the Princes Highway and the Kings Highway.

The mayor of Eurobodalla Shire Council is Mathew Hatcher, an unaligned politician.

He is also the youngest mayor, in the modern-era, ever for the Eurobodalla. The Deputy Mayor, Cllr Alison Worthington, is the first female Deputy Mayor for the Eurobodalla.

== Towns and localities ==
The shire chambers are located in the town of Moruya in the central part of the Shire. Other major towns within the shire include Batemans Bay and Narooma. Smaller towns, suburbs and hamlets include:

- Akolele
- Angledale
- Araluen (part)
- Batehaven
- Belowra
- Benandarah
- Bergalia
- Bimbimbie
- Bingie
- Bodalla
- Broulee
- Buckenbowra
- Central Tilba
- Cadgee
- Catalina
- Coila
- Congo
- Corunna
- Currowan
- Dalmeny
- Denhams Beach
- Deua River Valley
- East Lynne (part)
- Eurobodalla
- Guerilla Bay
- Jeremadra
- Kianga
- Kiora
- Lilli Pilli
- Long Beach
- Maloneys Beach
- Malua Bay
- Meringo
- Merricumbene
- Mogendoura
- Mogo
- Moruya Heads
- Mossy Point
- Mystery Bay
- Nelligen
- Nerrigundah
- North Batemans Bay
- North Narooma
- Potato Point
- Rosedale
- Runnyford
- South Durras
- Sunshine Bay
- Surf Beach
- Surfside
- Tilba Tilba
- Tinpot
- Tomakin
- Turlinjah
- Tuross Head
- Wallaga Lake Koori Village
- Wamban
- Woodlands

== History ==
The area which is now Eurobodalla Shire was originally the home of the South Coast Bugelli-Manji and Yuin Aboriginal peoples. The council signed a Commitment to Indigenous Australians and a Local Agreement with the Aboriginal Community.

The Eurobodalla Shire Council was formed in 1913 with the responsibility for administering local government functions along 110 kilometres (68 mi) of the NSW coast between Durras and Wallaga Lake. The council administers only about 30% of the area of the Shire as the remaining 70% is non-rateable crown land held as national park and state forest: 40% of the shire is national park, 30% is state forest, 20% is productive farmland and 10% is urban settlement.

The Shire is unusual in that nearly half of ratepayers are non-residents. Just over 17% of ratepayers are residents of Canberra. Although the permanent population is around 34,100, the visiting population (who stay more than 3 nights) is 3.1 million per year.

== Heritage listings ==
The Eurobodalla Shire has a number of heritage-listed sites, including:

- Bergalia, Lakeview Homestead Complex
- Montague Island, Montague Island Light
- Moruya, Moruya and District Historical Society 85 Campbell Street: Abernethy and Co Stonemason's Lathe
- Moruya, 13 Page Street: Moruya Mechanics' Institute

== Economy ==
The main growth industries in the area are construction, government services, real estate, retail, retirement, aged care, tourism, while dairy farming, forestry, sawmilling and commercial fishing are traditional industries in decline. Eurobodalla Shire is serviced by two highways – the Princes Highway between Sydney and Melbourne (part of Highway One around Australia), and the Kings Highway (National Route 52) linking Batemans Bay to Canberra. Moruya Airport, just east of the township of Moruya, is serviced by regular scheduled commuter flights to Sydney and Melbourne. There are no railways or major seaports in Eurobodalla Shire.

== Census 2021 statistics ==
=== Demographics ===
In the 2021 census, the Local Government Area of Eurobodalla recorded a population of 40,593 people. The area of 3,428 square kilometre gives a population density 11.8 people per square kilometre.

==== Age distribution ====
- Median age: 54, compared to the national median on 38.
- Children aged under 15 years: 13.9%.
- People aged 65 years and over: 32.9%.

==== Nation of birth ====
- Australia – 77.9%, compared to the national average of 66.9%
- England – 4.8%
- New Zealand – 1.3%
- Germany – 0.7%
- Scotland – 0.6%
- Netherlands – 0.5%
- Aboriginal or Torres Strait Islanders: 6.1%

==== Languages spoken at home ====
- English only – 88.5%
- German – 0.3%
- Italian – 0.3%
- Croatian – 0.2%
- Spanish – 0.2%
- Greek – 0.2%

==== Religion ====
- No Religion – 41.9%
- Catholic – 18.9%
- Anglican – 17.3%
- Uniting Church – 2.5%

=== Housing ===
- Median weekly rent: $325
- Median monthly home loan repayments: $1,517
- Median weekly individual income: $618
- Median weekly household income: $1,167

==== Household motor vehicle ownership ====
- No vehicle – 4.3%
- One vehicle – 38.3%
- Two vehicles – 37.7%
- Three or more vehicles – 17.9%

==== Housing tenure ====
- Owned outright – 49.3%
- Owned with a mortgage – 23.8%
- Rented – 22.5%

==== Structure of inhabited dwellings ====
- Separate houses – 83.6%
- Semi-detached, row or terrace houses, townhouses etc. – 8.3%
- Flats, units or apartments – 5.9%
- Other dwellings – 1.9%

=== Employment ===
- Worked full-time – 47.6%
- Worked part-time – 40.4%
- Away from work – 7.9%
- Unemployed – 4.1%

== Council ==
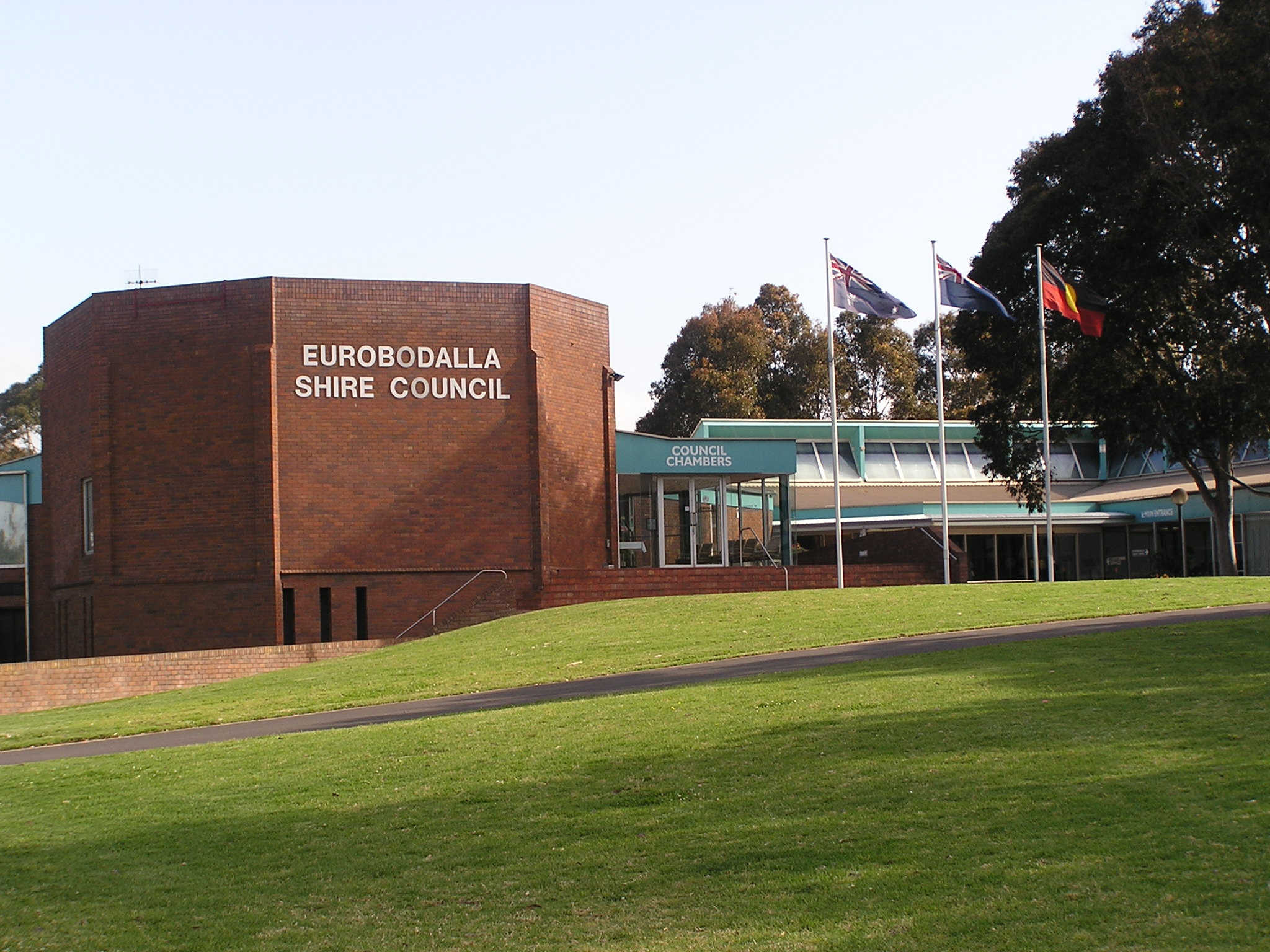
Offices of the Eurobodalla Shire Council at Moruya.

=== Current composition and election method ===
Eurobodalla Shire Council is composed of nine councillors, including the mayor, for a fixed four-year term of office. The mayor is directly elected while the eight other councillors are elected proportionally as one entire ward. The most recent election was held on 25 October 2021, and the makeup of the council, including the mayor, is as follows:

Party	Councillors
Advance Eurobodalla	3
Prefer Pollock	2
A Better Council	1
Labor	1
Greens	1
The Mayne Team	1
Total	9

The current Council, elected in 2021, in order of election, is:

Councillor	Party	Notes
Mat Hatcher	Advance Eurobodalla	Mayor
Rob Pollock	Prefer Pollock	
Noel 'Tubby' Harrison	A Better Council	
Anthony Mayne	The Mayne Team	
Amber Schutz	Advance Eurobodalla	
David Grace	Labor	
Alison Worthington	Greens	
Peter Diskon	Prefer Pollock	
Tanya Dannock	Advance Eurobodalla	

== Election results ==
=== 2024 ===
2024 New South Wales local elections: Eurobodalla
Party	Candidate	Votes	%	±%
Advance Eurobodalla	1. Mathew Hatcher (elected mayor); 2. Amber Schutz (elected 1); 3. Laurence Babington (elected 5); 4. Ronald Meek; 5. Carrie Taylor; 6. Rebecca Mahon; 7. Charles Stuart	7,105	29.1	+8.9
Team Pollock	1. Rob Pollock (elected 2); 2. Sofia Keady; 3. John Tait; 4. Keira Marchini; 5. Emily Zahra; 6. James Thomson; 7. Lindsay Brown	4,225	17.3	−1.4
One Eurobodalla	1. Phil Constable (elected 3); 2. Mick Johnson (elected 8); 3. Trish Hellier; 4. Kristy Beecham	4,015	16.4	
Labor	1. Sharon Winslade (elected 4); 2. Maureen Searson; 3. Maureen Ellis; 4. Gail Vincent	2,821	11.5	−3.6
The Mayne Team	1. Anthony Mayne (elected 6); 2. Karyn Starmer; 3. Michelle Hamrosi; 4. Sally Christiansen; 5. David Grice	2,255	9.2	−7.7
Greens	1. Colleen Turner (elected 7); 2. Joslyn van der Moolen; 3. Charlie Bell; 4. Niall O'Donnell	1,706	7.0	−3.8
Independent	1. Claire McAsh; 2. John Hawke; 3. Krystal Tritton; 4. Gary Traynor	1,153	4.7	
Independent	1. Jason Ford; 2. Marlene Brayshaw; 3. Dave Greer; 4. Rosemary Deadman; 5. Robert Fortune; 6. Geoff Martin	957	3.9	
Independent	Neil Gow	213	0.9	
Total formal votes		24,450	91.3	
Informal votes		2,341	8.7	
Turnout		26,791	81.9	

=== 2021 ===
Elected councillor	Party
Rob Pollock	Prefer Pollock
Noel (Tubby) Harrison	A Better Council
Anthony Mayne	The Mayne Team
Amber Schutz	Advance Eurobodalla
David Grace	Labor
Alison Worthington	Greens
Peter Diskon	Prefer Pollock
Tanya Dannock	Advance Eurobodalla

2021 New South Wales local elections: Eurobodalla
Party	Candidate	Votes	%	±%
	Advance Eurobodalla	5,012	20.1	
	Prefer Pollock	4,644	18.7	
	The Mayne Team	4,196	16.9	
	Labor	3,752	15.1	
	A Better Council	3,486	14.0	
	Greens	2,684	10.8	
	Independent (Group G)	1,101	4.4	
Total formal votes		24,875	93.3	
Informal votes		1,780	6.7	
Turnout		26,655	83.3	
