= Mogo, New South Wales =

Mogo
- Town
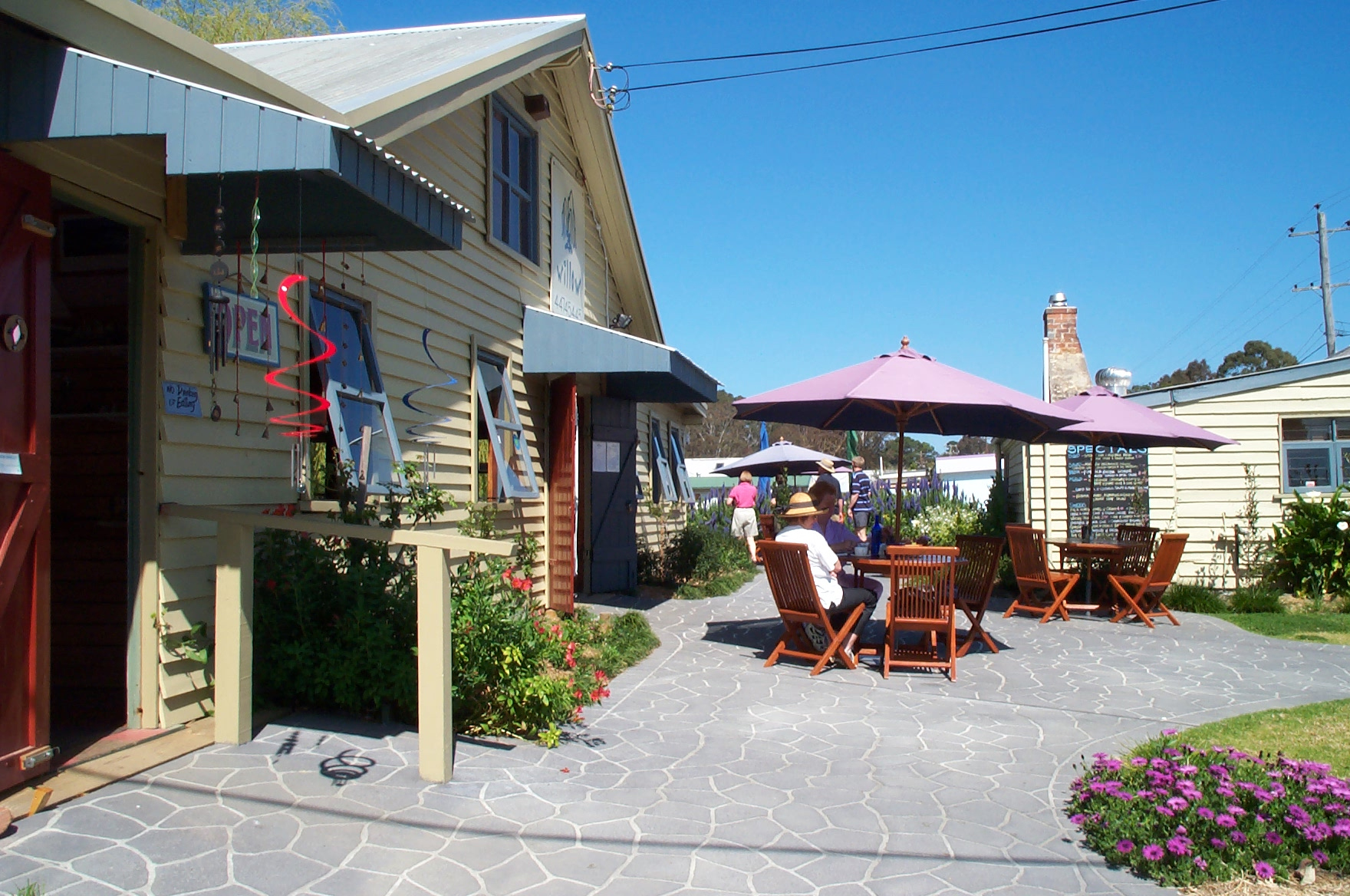
- Historic Mogo Village Cafes at Mogo, New South Wales

- Coordinates: 35°47′S 150°08′E
- Country: Australia
- State: New South Wales
- LGA: Eurobodalla Shire
- Location: 287 km (178 mi) SSW of Sydney; 17.5 km (10.9 mi) N of Moruya; 137 km (85 mi) NNE of Bega
- Established: 1851

Government
  - State electorate: Bega
  - Federal division: Gilmore

Population
  - Total: 249 (UCL 2021)
- Postcode: 2536
Localities around Mogo
| Runnyford | Batemans Bay | Batehaven |
| Buckenbowra | Mogo | Woodlands |
| Mogendoura | Jeremadra | Tomakin |

Mogo (postcode: 2536) is a small heritage town in the South Coast region of the state of New South Wales, Australia. Mogo is administered by the Eurobodalla Shire council. The town is located on the Princes Highway (Highway 1), south of Batemans Bay and north of Moruya. At the 2021 census, Mogo had a population of 249.

Mogo was established during the Gold Rush after a gold find was reported in 1851. Bimbimbie, the last gold mine in the Mogo area, closed in 1984. The town survived as a sleepy highway town, and during the 1990s was revitalised with the growth in regional tourism. Mogo is now home to a variety of tourist-centric stores including cafes, art galleries, potters, and furniture stores. Mogo is also a centre for the Aboriginal population of the area.

Mogo is home to Mogo Wildlife Park, a private zoo specializing in breeding programs for endangered species. Although small in comparison to metropolitan zoos, Mogo Wildlife Park is home to many exotic species, such as the red panda and the snow leopard, the latter of which was successfully bred at Mogo Wildlife Park in 1999. Mogo Wildlife Park also participates in programs with other Australian zoos, and its collection of animals changes regularly.

Mogo has a small public primary school, Mogo Public School, that serves Mogo's sparsely populated surroundings. It has around 70 enrolled students, who usually continue their public secondary education at Batemans Bay High School or Moruya High School, or in the private secondary schools of Carroll College and St. Peters Anglican College, both at nearby Broulee.

Home to a vibrant art community, Mogo has established itself as one of the major centres of local art and craftwork, and has more art galleries than any of the surrounding (larger) towns of Batemans Bay and Moruya, with people travelling from as far as Canberra in the Australian Capital Territory, as well as other parts of regional NSW and interstate to regularly view and purchase art and crafts.

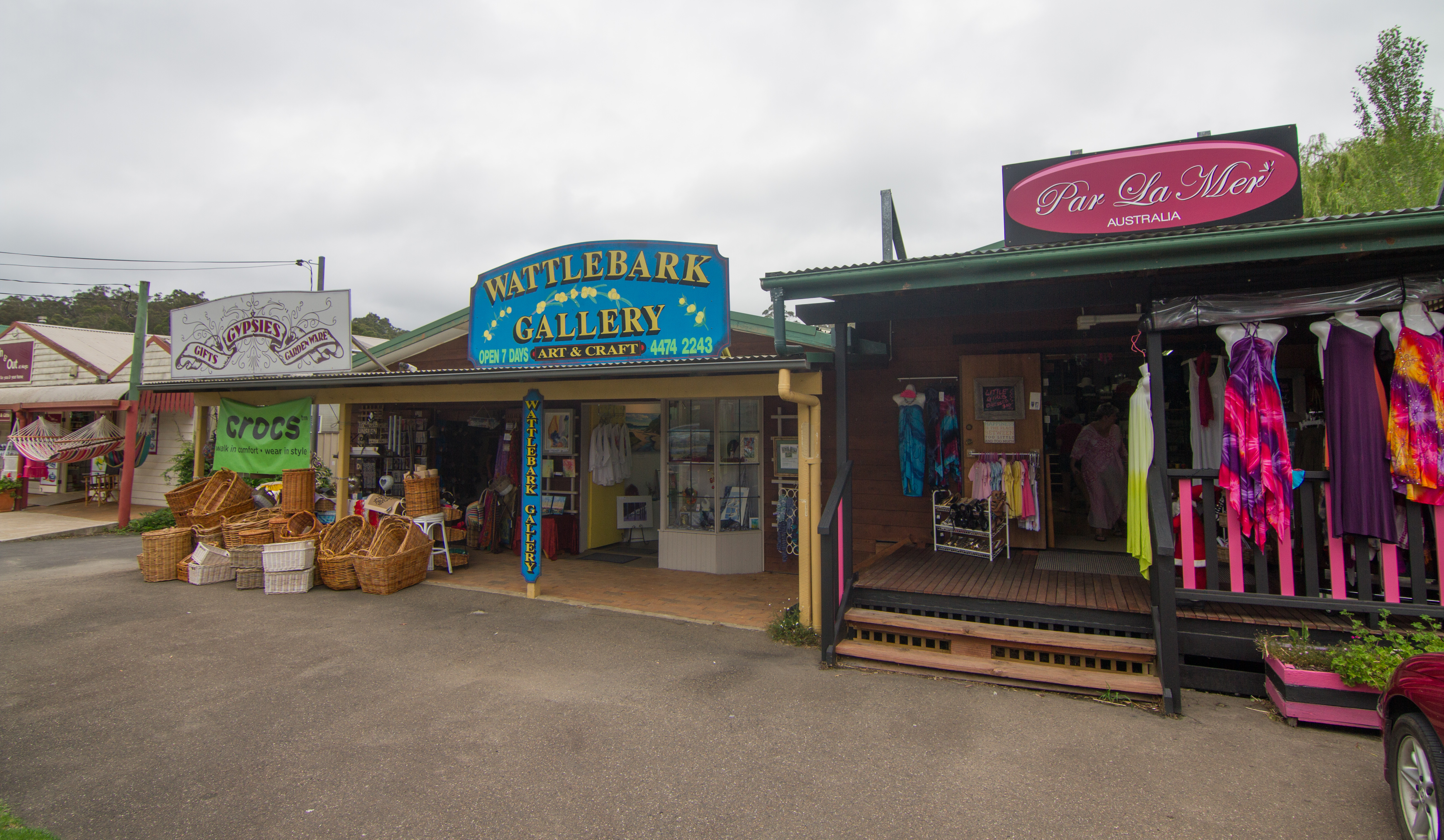
Shops in Mogo.

Mogo was affected by the 2019–20 Australian bushfire season, in which one of the town's most popular attractions, the Mogo Gold Rush had burnt down, along with many other shops and businesses, including Mill's Bookshop, which was the residence of the store's owner.
