= Mogo Wildlife Park =

- Mogo Zoo logo
- Interactive map of Mogo Wildlife Park
- 35.7954°S 150.1592°E
- Date opened: 17 November 1991
- Location: Mogo, New South Wales, Australia
- Land area: 13.11 ha (32.4 acres) zoo site; entire property 26.88 ha (66.4 acres)
- No. of animals: 220+
- No. of species: 30+
- Website: mogowildlifepark.com.au

Mogo Wildlife Park (formerly Mogo Zoo) is a small privately owned zoo in Mogo, on the south coast of New South Wales, Australia.

== Description ==
Mogo is a member of the Zoo and Aquarium Association and has had success in breeding programs for endangered species, including the cotton-top tamarin, black-and-white ruffed lemur, red panda, and Sumatran tiger. The zoo has one of Australia's largest collections of primates. Unlike most small Australian zoos, Mogo Wildlife Park focuses on exotic species.

Mogo Wildlife Park exhibits a large African savanna, and a series of islands for primate species. The zoo took over care from some unwanted animals from other collections. During the 1990s, the zoo kept an endangered kea parrot, the only individual held in any Australian zoo at the time or since, and was also the home of the last Siberian tiger in Australasia (Kuldur, who died in June 1997 aged seventeen). Snow leopards were a long term species at the park (beginning in October 1995) and the park was the first zoo in New South Wales to birth this species when on 20 October 1999 a female cub Sheva and male cub Bhutan were born to parents Lena and Mangar, who had another pair of cubs born at the park on 12 October 2003 (female Tenzin the last Snow leopard at the park who lived for 19 years, and male Khumbu, named after the region).

In November 2019, Featherdale Wildlife Park bought Mogo Zoo from former owner Sally Padey, and took over full ownership and operations from the end of that month.

During the devastating December 2019 bushfires, staff at Mogo Wildlife Park exhibited extraordinary dedication by remaining at the park to safeguard the animals. As the fire approached, the town of Mogo was evacuated, but the staff chose to stay behind to protect the wildlife under their care. Their efforts included implementing fire protection measures and maintaining the animals' welfare amidst the chaos. This unwavering commitment ensured the safety of the park's inhabitants during one of the most challenging periods faced by the region.

The park also keep Asian water buffalo herds which can be sighted in paddock directly north of the zoo grounds viewable on the inland side driving Tomakin Road in the direction towards Princes Highway and Mogo village shops.

Orangutan duo Jantan and Willow, originally from Taronga Zoo and have lived at the park since September 2018, are of mixed origin of both the Bornean and the Sumatran species, are currently not housed in the general public viewing area of the zoo.

== Animal species on public display ==
- African lion
- Asian small-clawed otter
- Binturong
- Black-and-white ruffed lemur
- Bolivian squirrel monkey
- Black-handed spider monkey
- Brown capuchin monkey
- Buffon's macaw
- Caracal
- Cheetah
- Cotton-top tamarin
- Dingo
- Dromedary camel
- Eastern grey kangaroo
- Egyptian goose
- Emperor tamarin
- Fallow deer
- Giraffe
- Golden lion tamarin
- Kangaroo Island grey kangaroo
- Koala
- Meerkat
- Palyoora
- Plains zebra
- Pygmy marmoset
- Quokka
- Radiated tortoise
- Red panda
- Red-handed tamarin
- Ring-tailed lemur
- Serval
- Siamang
- Silvery gibbon
- Southern white rhinoceros
- Spotted hyena
- Sri Lankan leopard
- Swamp wallaby
- Sumatran tiger
- Wandering whistling duck
- Western lowland gorilla
