= Mossy Point =

- Town
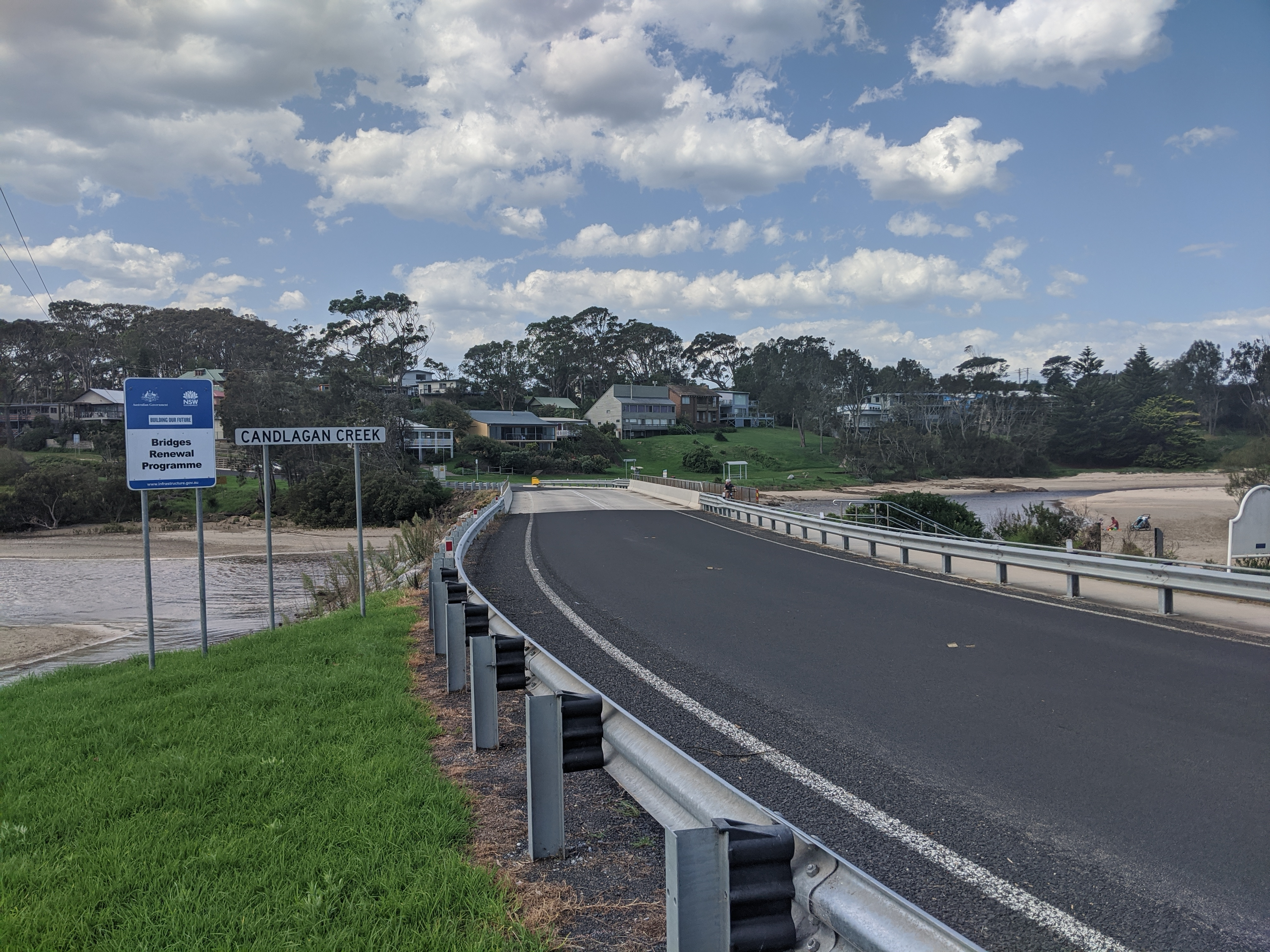
- Mossy Point, from Broulee over Candlagan Creek

- Coordinates: 35°50′23″S 150°10′41″E
- Country: Australia
- State: New South Wales
- Region: South Coast
- LGA: Eurobodalla Shire
- Location: 14 km (8.7 mi) NE of Moruya; 290 km (180 mi) S of Sydney; 165 km (103 mi) SE of Canberra

Government
  - State electorate: Bega
  - Federal division: Gilmore

Population
  - Total: 608 (SAL 2021)
- Postcode: 2537
- County: St Vincent
- Parish: Tomaga
Localities around Mossy Point
Jeremadra	Tomakin	Tomakin
Jeremadra	Mossy Point	Tasman Sea
Broulee	Broulee	Tasman Sea

Mossy Point is a suburb in Eurobodalla Shire, New South Wales, Australia. It lies on the Tasman Sea coast to the north of Broulee, separated by Candlagan Creek. It is about 14 km northeast of Moruya and 290 km south of Sydney. At the 2021 census, it had a population of 608.
