= Batemans Bay (bay) =

- Yangary (Dhurga)
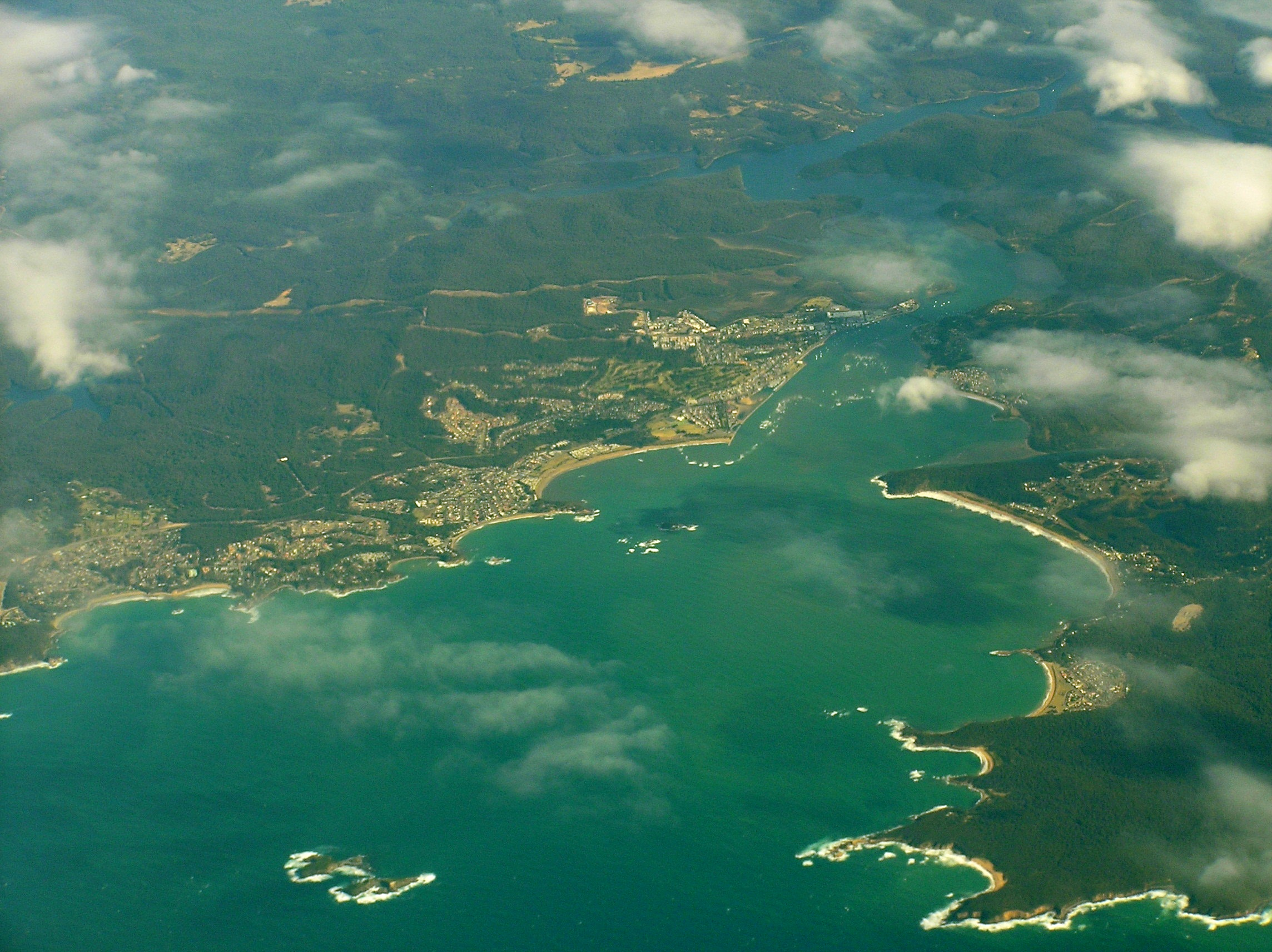
- Aerial photo, looking west, 2008.

- Location within New South Wales
- Location: South Coast, New South Wales
- Coordinates: 35°44′S 150°13′E
- Type: Bay
- Primary inflows: Clyde River
- Primary outflows: Tasman Sea, South Pacific Ocean
- Catchment area: 28 km^{2} (11 sq mi)
- Basin countries: Australia
- Surface area: 34.5 km^{2} (13.3 sq mi)
- Average depth: 11.1 m (36 ft)
- Water volume: 383,484 megalitres (13,542.6×10^{6} cu ft)
- Frozen: never
- Islands: Snapper Island, Tollgate Islands
- Settlements: Batemans Bay

Batemans Bay is an open oceanic embayment that is located in the South Coast region of New South Wales, Australia. The bay forms the mouth of the Clyde River and its primary outflow is to the Tasman Sea of the South Pacific Ocean.

== Location and features ==
Batemans Bay is fed by the Clyde River and its tributaries, drawing its catchment from the eastern slopes of the Budawang Range and the Great Dividing Range from within the Budawang, Clyde River, Bimberamala, and Monga national parks. Cullendulla Creek also flows into Batemans Bay, between the townships of Surfside and Longbeach, west of Square Head.

The total catchment area of the bay is approximately 28 square kilometres (11 sq mi) and the bay holds an estimated 383,484 megalitres (13,542.6×10^{6} cu ft) of water at an average depth of 11.1 metres (36 ft). The surface area of the bay comprises 34.5 square kilometres (13.3 sq mi) and generally stretches from the confluence of the Clyde River with the bay east of the town of Batemans Bay, near Snapper Island; to its mouth with the Tasman Sea at the Tollgate Islands, located between North Head and Circuit Beach.

== History ==
The traditional custodians of the land surrounding Batemans Bay are the Indigenous Australian Yuin people of the Walbunja clan. The Indigenous name for Batemans Bay (Bay) is Yangary. A number of sites surrounding the bay are considered culturally significant to the Aboriginal peoples.

On 22 April 1770, European explorer, Captain James Cook first sighted the bay when navigating his way around Australia on his ship, HMS Endeavour. Cook may have named the bay in honour of Nathaniel Bateman; the captain of HMS Northumberland at the time when Cook was serving as her master from 1760 to 1762. Alternatively, the name was chosen in honour of John Bateman, 2nd Viscount Bateman, a former Lord Commissioner of the Admiralty in the 1750s.

In 1906, little penguins inhabited the Tollgate Islands, and Snapper Island was said to be a burial place used by indigenous people. In 2002, the offshore islands of Bateman's Bay were known to support large breeding populations of little penguin, wedge-tailed shearwater, short-tailed shearwater and white-faced storm-petrel and small populations of sooty oystercatcher, sooty shearwater and eastern reef egret.

== See also ==
- List of lakes of Australia
