= Monga, New South Wales =

Monga
- Town
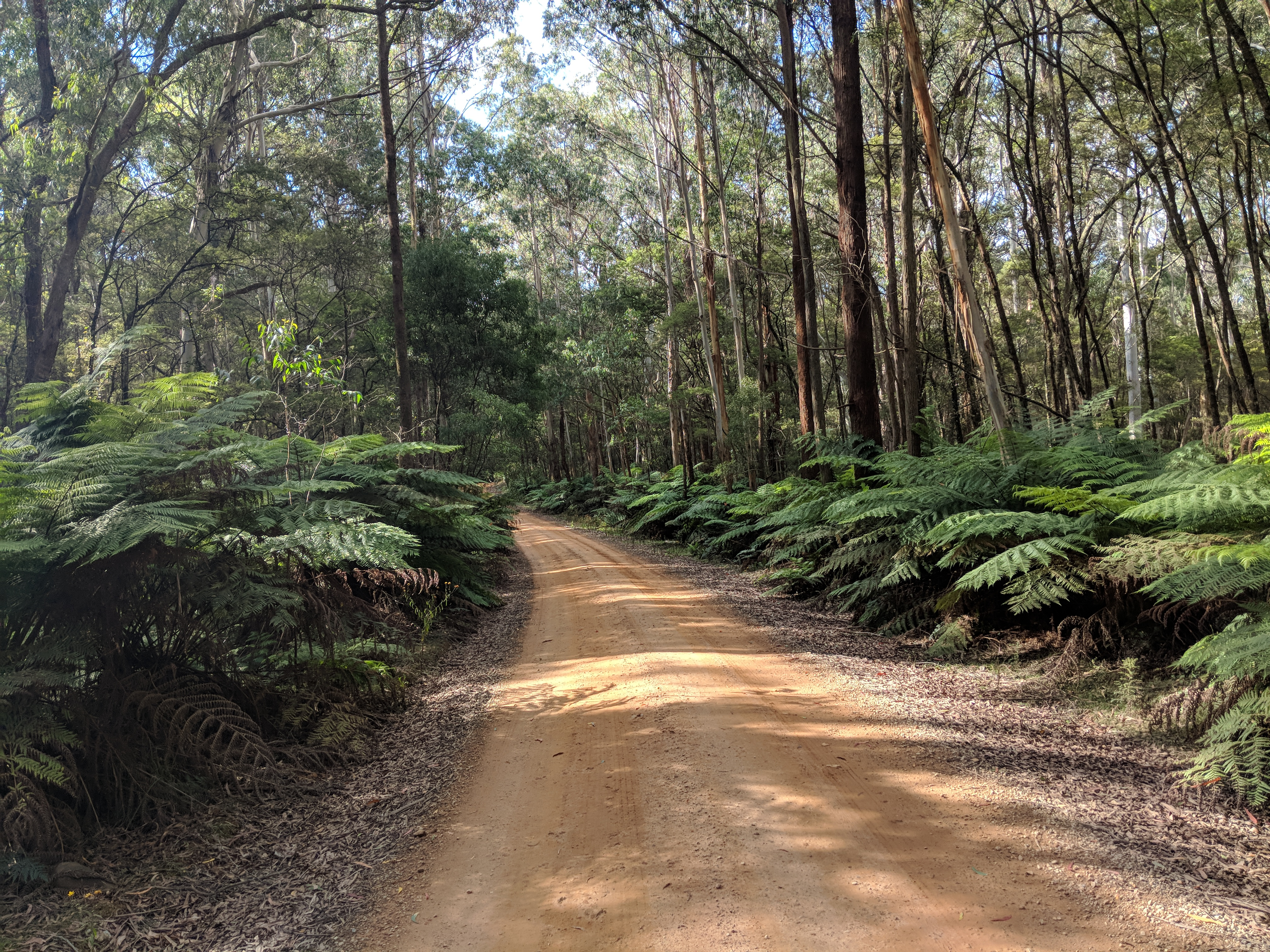
- River Forest Road, connecting the more-recent settlement of Monga with the original settlement on the Kings Highway, in Monga National Park

- Interactive map of Monga
- Coordinates: 35°34′57″S 149°55′02″E
- Country: Australia
- State: New South Wales
- Region: Southern Tablelands
- LGA: Queanbeyan-Palerang Regional Council
- Location: 22 km (14 mi) SE of Braidwood; 110 km (68 mi) E of Canberra; 43 km (27 mi) NW of Batemans Bay; 301 km (187 mi) SSW of Sydney

Government
  - State electorate: Monaro
  - Federal division: Eden-Monaro
- Elevation: 704 m (2,310 ft)

Population
  - Total: 27 (SAL 2021)
- Postcode: 2622
- County: St Vincent
- Parish: Monga
Localities around Monga
Northangera	Northangera	Budawang
Reidsdale	Monga	Currowan
Reidsdale	Araluen	Buckenbowra

Monga is a locality in the Queanbeyan-Palerang Region, Southern Tablelands, New South Wales, Australia. It lies on the Kings Highway at the top of the Clyde Mountain, about 110 km east of Canberra and 22 km southeast of Braidwood. A large part of the locality forms part of the Monga National Park. At the 2016 census, it had a population of 14.

Monga lies near the watershed of the Shoalhaven and Clyde River catchments; the Mongarlowe River flows to the Shoalhaven and the Buckenbowra River—flowing to the Clyde—has its source within the locality.

The area, now known as Monga, lies on the traditional lands of Walbanga people, a group of Yuin. An early bridle track to the Buckenbowra Valley, known, as the Corn Trail by early settlers, follows the general route of a Walbanga footpath.

There was once a small village of the same name, which lay near the right bank of the Mongalowe River, on the Clyde Road near the junction with the road from Reidsdale and Majors Creek (the modern day River Forest Road). The road to Major's Creek is still called Monga Lane. It was the location of a tollbar on the Clyde Road—from 1860 to 1865—and a village site was officially reserved there in 1881.

The first sawmill was established in 1880 and was powered by large waterwheel, using water from the river. It operated until 1914.

By the mid 20th-century, a timber village had been established at Monga, several kilometres south of the site on the Clyde Road, with a large sawmill nearby. The village had 18 houses in 1948—more were being built to house timber industry employees—and a 'bachelors' quarters' housing 12 single men. A new village hall was built in 1954. Monga had a provisional school from 1947 to 1955 and a public school from 1955 to 1971.

The sawmill closed in 1966, when the supply of high-quality timber was depleted. The operator, Monga Sawmill Pty Limited, was wound up in the same year. However, it was reopened by new owners and worked until at least 1975. Without employment and a school, the village faded away and there is little sign of it now.

Nearby Mongarlowe, which in the 19th century was a much bigger settlement, was called Monga until 1891.
