= Buckenbowra River =

Coordinates: 35°38′S 149°59′E

Location
- Country: Australia
- State: New South Wales
- Region: South East Corner (IBRA), South Coast
- Local government area: Eurobodalla

Physical characteristics
- Source: Great Dividing Range within Monga National Park
  - location: near Monga
  - elevation: 601 m (1,972 ft)
- Mouth: confluence with the Clyde River
  - location: west of Batemans Bay
  - elevation: 2 m (6 ft 7 in)
- Length: 41 km (25 mi)

Basin features
- River system: Clyde River catchment
- Tributaries
  - right: Quart Pot Creek, Mullendaree Creek
- National parks: Monga, Clyde

Buckenbowra River, a perennial river of the Clyde River catchment, is located in the upper ranges of the South Coast region of New South Wales, Australia.

== Course and features ==
Buckenbowra River rises on the eastern slopes of the Great Dividing Range within Monga National Park, approximately 1.6 km (1 mi) northeast of the village of Monga, flows through a series of heavily wooded gorges, joined by two minor tributaries, before reaching its confluence with the Clyde River within Clyde River National Park, around 5 km (3 mi) from the town of Batemans Bay. The river descends 598 metres (1,962 ft) over its 42 kilometres (26 mi) course.

== History ==
The traditional custodians of the land surrounding Buckenbowra River are the Indigenous Australian people of the Walbanja clan.

European settlement occurred in the 1830s when a horse trail was established running beside the waterway. In the 1850s this rough track was replaced with a convict-built road, supported in cuttings by dry stone walls. The road was abandoned during the nineteenth century, with one forgotten 770 m (0.48 mi) section rediscovered in 2005.

== Flora and fauna ==
The gorges through which the Buckenbowra River flows are dominated by stands of casuarina trees. Mangroves are endemic along the river banks, providing the only recorded habitat for the lichen Pertusaria melaleucoides.

Fish species include Australian grayling and Australian bass.

== See also ==
- Budawang Range
- Corn Trail
- Deua National Park
- Rivers of New South Wales
- List of rivers of New South Wales (A–K)
- List of rivers of Australia
