= Bimberamala River =

River in Australia

Coordinates: 35°30′55″S 150°07′04″E

Bimberamala River Bimberamala Creek

Location
- Country: Australia
- State: New South Wales
- Region: South East Corner (IBRA), Southern Tablelands, South Coast
- Local government areas: Shoalhaven, Eurobodalla

Physical characteristics
- Source: Budawang Range, Great Dividing Range
  - location: below Mount Budawang, within Budawang National Park
  - elevation: 814 m (2,671 ft)
- Mouth: confluence with the Clyde River
  - location: north of the village of Brooman
  - elevation: 57 m (187 ft)
- Length: 50 km (31 mi)

Basin features
- River system: Clyde River catchment
- Tributaries
  - right: Carters Creek
- National parks: Budawang, Bimberamala

Bimberamala River, a perennial river of the Clyde River catchment, is located in the Southern Tablelands and the upper ranges of the South Coast regions of New South Wales, Australia.

== Course and features ==
Bimberamala River rises below Mount Budawang, on the eastern slopes of the Budawang Range, part of the Great Dividing Range and within Budawang National Park. The river generally flows northeast, then south, then east northeast, and finally north northeast, through Bimberamala National Park and Yadbro State Forest, joined by one minor tributary, before reaching its confluence with the Clyde River, north of the village of Brooman. The river descends 757 metres (2,484 ft) over its 50 kilometres (31 mi) course.

== See also ==
- Rivers of New South Wales
- List of rivers of New South Wales (A–K)
- List of rivers of Australia
