= Northangera =

- Town
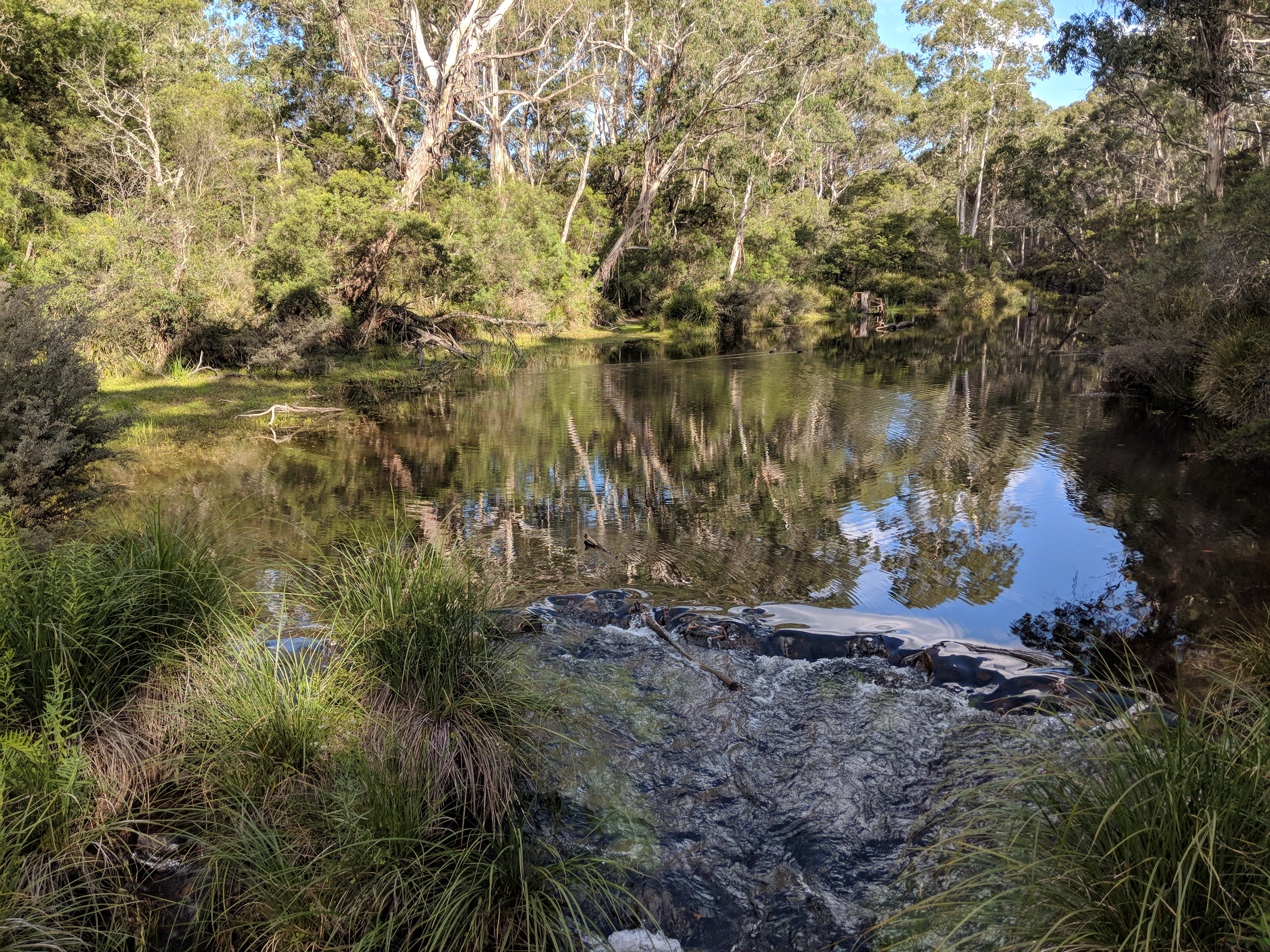
- Mongarlowe river at Northangera

- Coordinates: 35°27′40″S 149°54′36″E
- Country: Australia
- State: New South Wales
- Region: Southern Tablelands
- LGA: Queanbeyan-Palerang Regional Council
- Location: 15 km (9.3 mi) E of Braidwood; 100 km (62 mi) E of Canberra

Government
  - State electorate: Monaro
  - Federal division: Eden-Monaro

Population
  - Total: 44 (SAL 2021)
- Postcode: 2622
- County: St Vincent
- Parish: Budawang
Localities around Northangera
Braidwood	Mongarlowe	Budawang
Braidwood	Northangera	Budawang
Reidsdale	Monga	Monga

Northangera is a locality in the Queanbeyan-Palerang Region, Southern Tablelands, New South Wales, Australia. The name Northangera was assigned on 13 July 2001. It lies on the Kings Highway about 100 km east of Canberra and 15 km east of Braidwood. At the 2016 census, it had a population of 43.

The area now known as Northangera lies on the traditional lands of Walbanga people, a group of Yuin.

It had a "half-time" school from 1921 to 1931.
