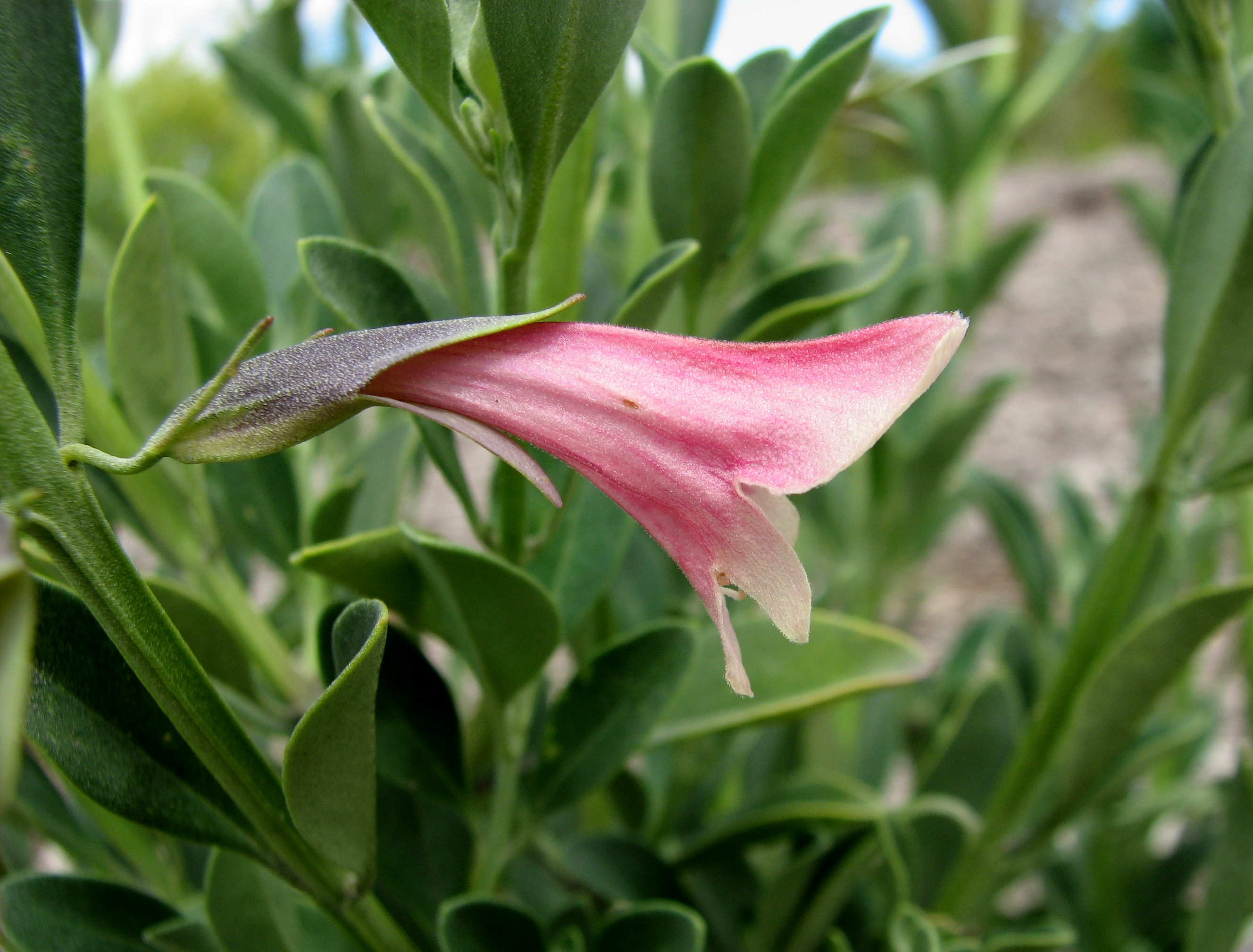
- In Royal Botanic Gardens, Cranbourne

Scientific classification
- Kingdom: Plantae
- Clade: Tracheophytes
- Clade: Angiosperms
- Clade: Eudicots
- Clade: Asterids
- Order: Lamiales
- Family: Lamiaceae
- Genus: Prostanthera
- Species: P. porcata

Binomial name
- Prostanthera porcata B.J.Conn
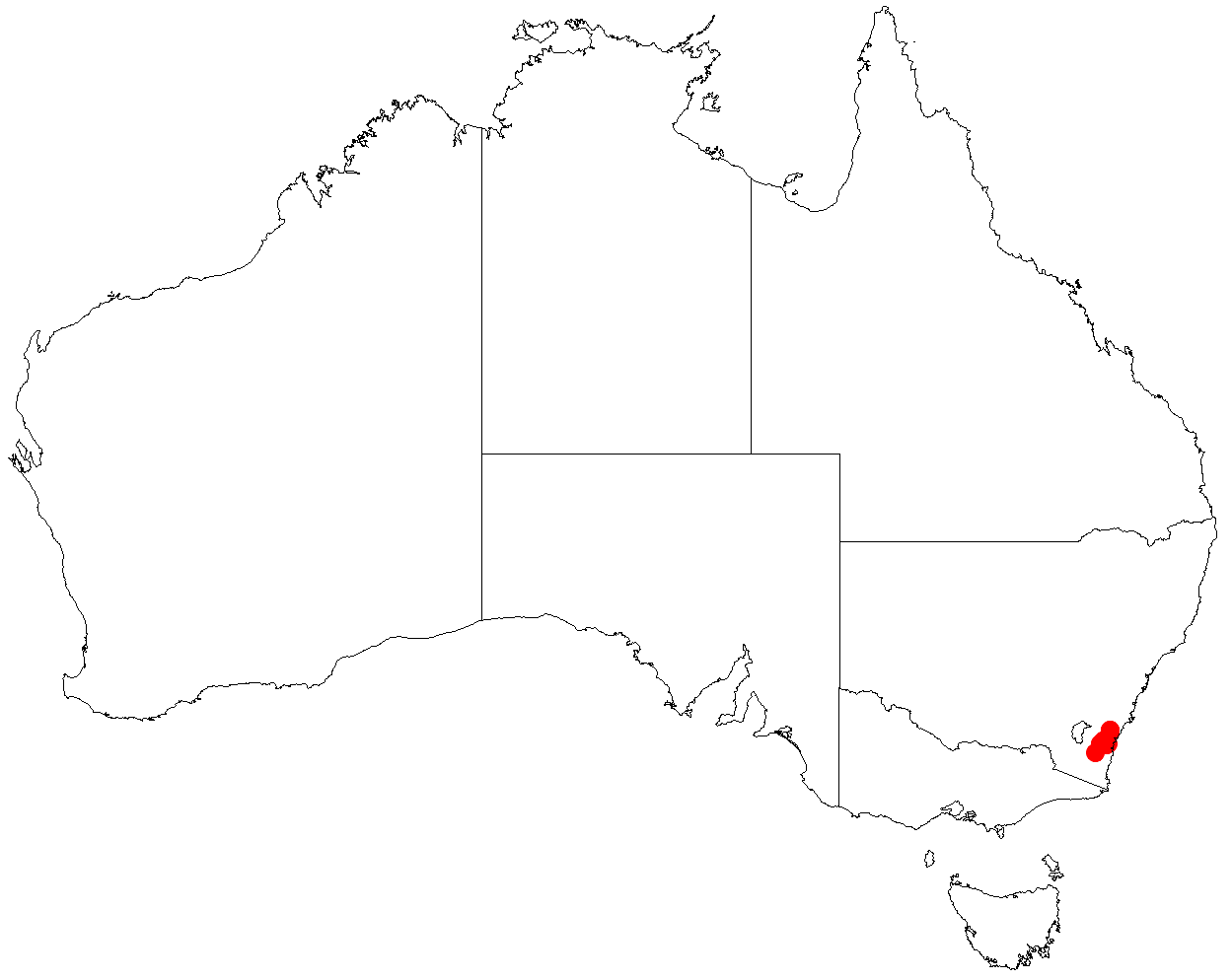
- Occurrence data from AVH

= Prostanthera porcata =

Species of flowering plant

Prostanthera porcata is a species of flowering plant in the family Lamiaceae and is endemic to the Budawang Range in south-eastern New South Wales. It is a small, erect shrub with glabrous branches, elliptic leaves and deep pink or pink and cream-coloured flowers.

== Description ==
Prostanthera porcata is an erect shrub that typically grows to a height of 1.5–2 m (4 ft 11 in – 6 ft 7 in) and has four-ridged, glabrous, densely glandular branches. The leaves are elliptic, 22–36 mm (0.87–1.42 in) long and 7–14 mm (0.28–0.55 in) wide on a petiole 2–8 mm (0.079–0.315 in) long. The flowers appear singly in leaf axils on a pedicel 4–5 mm (0.16–0.20 in) long with bracteoles 2.8–5.6 mm (0.11–0.22 in) long at the base. The sepals are 12–15.5 mm (0.47–0.61 in) long forming a tube 8–9 mm (0.31–0.35 in) long with two lobes 5–7 mm (0.20–0.28 in) long. The petals are deep pink or cream-coloured shading to pink on the lobes, 23–27 mm (0.91–1.06 in) long forming a tube 15–22 mm (0.59–0.87 in) long. Flowering occurs in spring.

== Taxonomy ==
The species was formally described in 1984 by Barry Conn in the Journal of the Adelaide Botanic Gardens, based on plant material collected in Budawang National Park.

== Distribution and habitat ==
This mintbush grows in forests on steep rocky slopes in association with Eucalyptus agglomerata and E. sieberi and is only known from the Budawang Range in south-eastern New South Wales.
