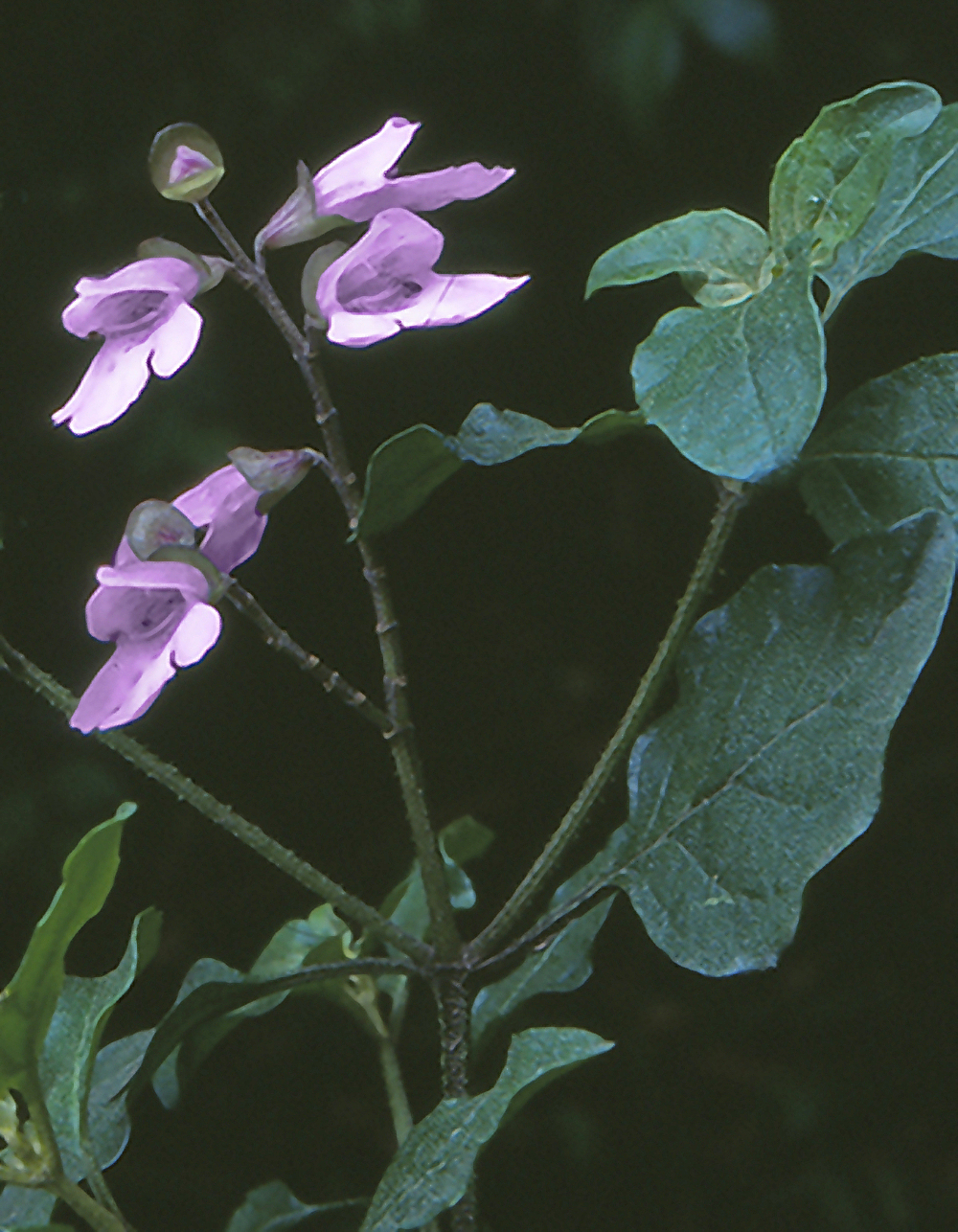
- Near the Yadboro River

Scientific classification
- Kingdom: Plantae
- Clade: Tracheophytes
- Clade: Angiosperms
- Clade: Eudicots
- Clade: Asterids
- Order: Lamiales
- Family: Lamiaceae
- Genus: Prostanthera
- Species: P. prunelloides

Binomial name
- Prostanthera prunelloides R.Br.
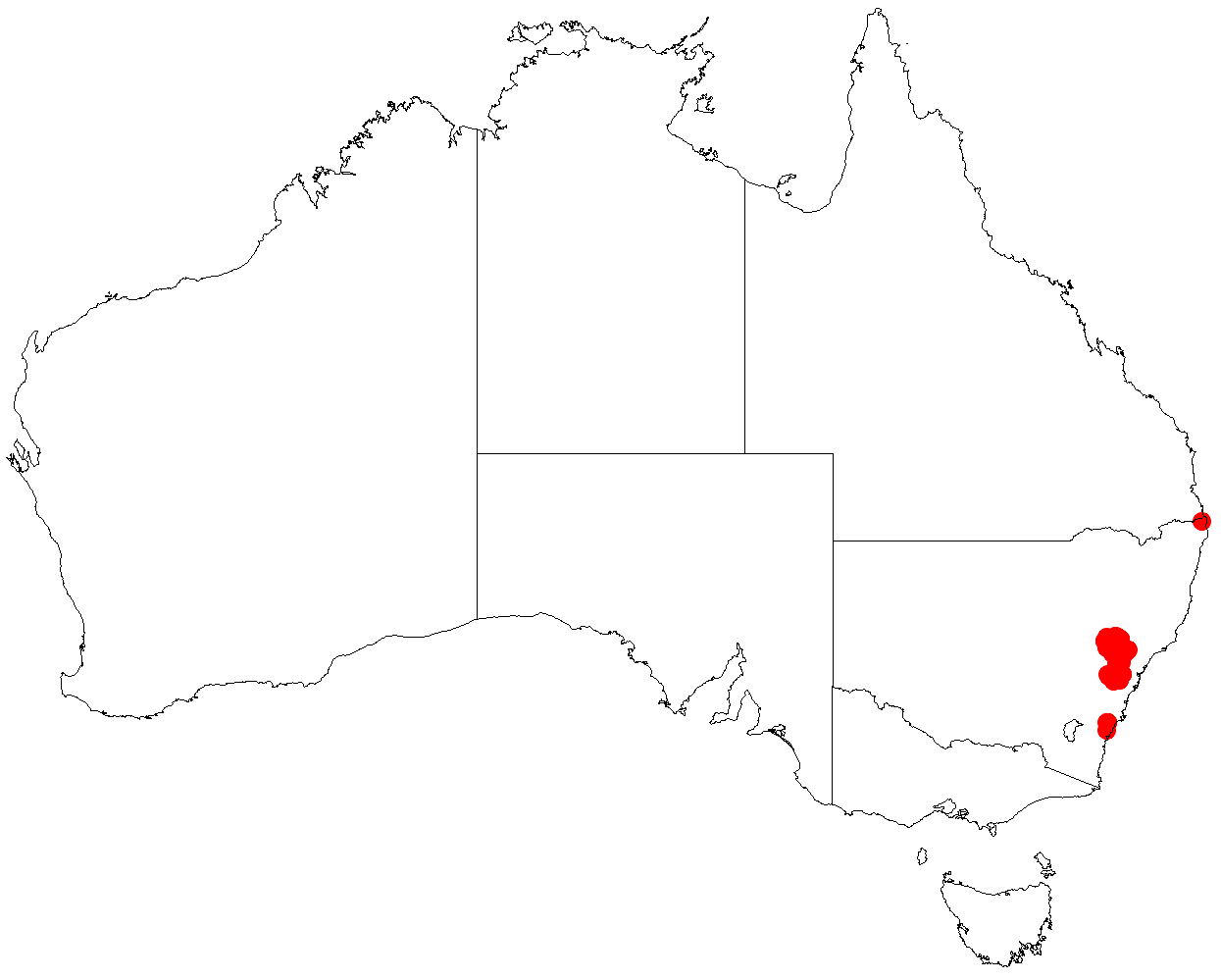
- Occurrence data from AVH

= Prostanthera prunelloides =

Species of flowering plant

Prostanthera prunelloides is a species of flowering plant in the family Lamiaceae and is endemic to eastern New South Wales. It is a shrub with four-ridged branches, egg-shaped to round leaves and white or pale mauve flowers.

== Description ==
Prostanthera prunelloides is an erect to spreading shrub that typically grows to a height of 1.5–2 m (4 ft 11 in – 6 ft 7 in) and has four-ridged, slightly aromatic branches. The leaves are egg-shaped to circular, 16–65 mm (0.63–2.56 in) long and 9–40 mm (0.35–1.57 in) wide on a petiole 3–14 mm (0.12–0.55 in) long. The flowers are arranged in groups on the ends of branchlets, each flower with bracteoles about 2.5 mm (0.098 in) long at the base but that fall off as the flower develops. The sepals are 5–6.5 mm (0.20–0.26 in) long forming a tube 3–3.5 mm (0.12–0.14 in) long with two lobes, the upper lobe 2–3 mm (0.079–0.118 in) long. The petals are white to pale mauve and 12–15 mm (0.47–0.59 in) long.

== Taxonomy ==
Prostanthera prunelloides was formally described in 1810 by Robert Brown in his treatise Prodromus Florae Novae Hollandiae et Insulae Van Diemen.

== Distribution and habitat ==
This mintbush grows in forests and woodland, often near creeks, on the coast and tablelands of New South Wales from Murwillumbah to the Budawang Range.
