= Corn Trail, New South Wales =

Walking track and former horse trail in Australia

The Corn Trail was an early bridle track linking the Southern Tablelands to the coastal valley of the Buckenbowra River, in New South Wales, Australia. It was restored and reopened as a walking track in 1988.

== History ==
The Corn Trail lies on the traditional lands of Walbanga people, a group of Yuin. It is almost certain that the route of what would later be known as the Corn Trail generally follows foot pathways used by local people.

The lower reaches of the Buckenbowra River lie in a lush coastal river valley that connects to the Clyde River close to Batemans Bay. The valley was colonised in the 1830s. At the time, the new settlements on the Southern Tablelands had no direct connection to a coastal port and needed to use the long road to Sydney to obtain supplies and ship produce. The Buckenbowra valley provided an easy route from the coast to the base of the Clyde Mountain. The Corn Trail was built to ascend the range to reach the Southern Tablelands. To maintain suitable gradients, the trail zigzagged across the face of the steeply sloping landforms. The trail was constructed using convicts assigned to local landowners. It was in use by 1838.

The trail was only suitable for pack animals—it was too steep for wheeled traffic of any kind—but nonetheless was an important route to the tablelands. From the Buckenbowra valley, other trails over low foothills connected the Corn Trail to coastal settlements at Broulee and Moruya. The Corn Trail was part of a mail route between Broulee and Braidwood from early 1840.

From late 1841, a road known as "The Wool Road" linked the tablelands to the coast at Jervis Bay, but was ultimately a failure. The Corn Trail remained in use during the early years of the gold rush to the area round Braidwood, but quickly fell into disuse following the opening, in 1858, of the Clyde Road—later the Kings Highway—that connected the tablelands to the port of Nelligen on the Clyde River

The Corn Trail was used by the Clarke Brothers and the others of their gang of bushrangers, during the 1860s, when—as outlaws—they used lesser known routes to move around the district without detection. By the 1920s, the trail had become completely overgrown and effectively lost.

Long forgotten and overgrown, it was restored, as a project for the Australian Bicentennial celebrations, and reopened, as a walking track, on 30 April 1988.

== Corn Trail walking track ==
The track is 15.4 km long. The upper end of the track is the Dasyurus Picnic Area within Monga National Park. The first 4 km of the track rises in elevation by approximately 150 m, to avoid steep gullies. It then decreases in elevation, by over 600m over the following 6 km. The track then maintains a relatively constant elevation, before a final short decline to the end of the track. The lower end of the track, in the Buckenbowra River valley, is at a carpark on the No Name Mountain Fire Trail that turns off Misty Mountain Road.

As it descends, the trail passes from high mountain ridges to deep valleys and from eucalypt forest to warm temperate rainforest. There are glimpses of Mount Budawang, the highest point of the Budawang Range, and the sandstone peaks of Pigeon House and The Castle further to the north. It crosses the Mongarlowe and Buckenbowra Rivers.

The track is graded as a Grade 4 walking track—on a scale from 1 to 5, with 5 being the most difficult—under the Australian Walking Track Grading System.

From 1 December 2020, the Corn Trail walking track was closed due to the danger of bushfire. The subsequent continuing closure of the walking track was to allow the surrounding forest and other vegetation to recover from the catastrophic impact of the Clyde Mountain bushfire. The trail was opened again in 2022.
