= Yadboro River =

River in New South Wales, Australia

Coordinates: 35°18′55″S 150°07′04″E

Yadboro River Yadboro Creek
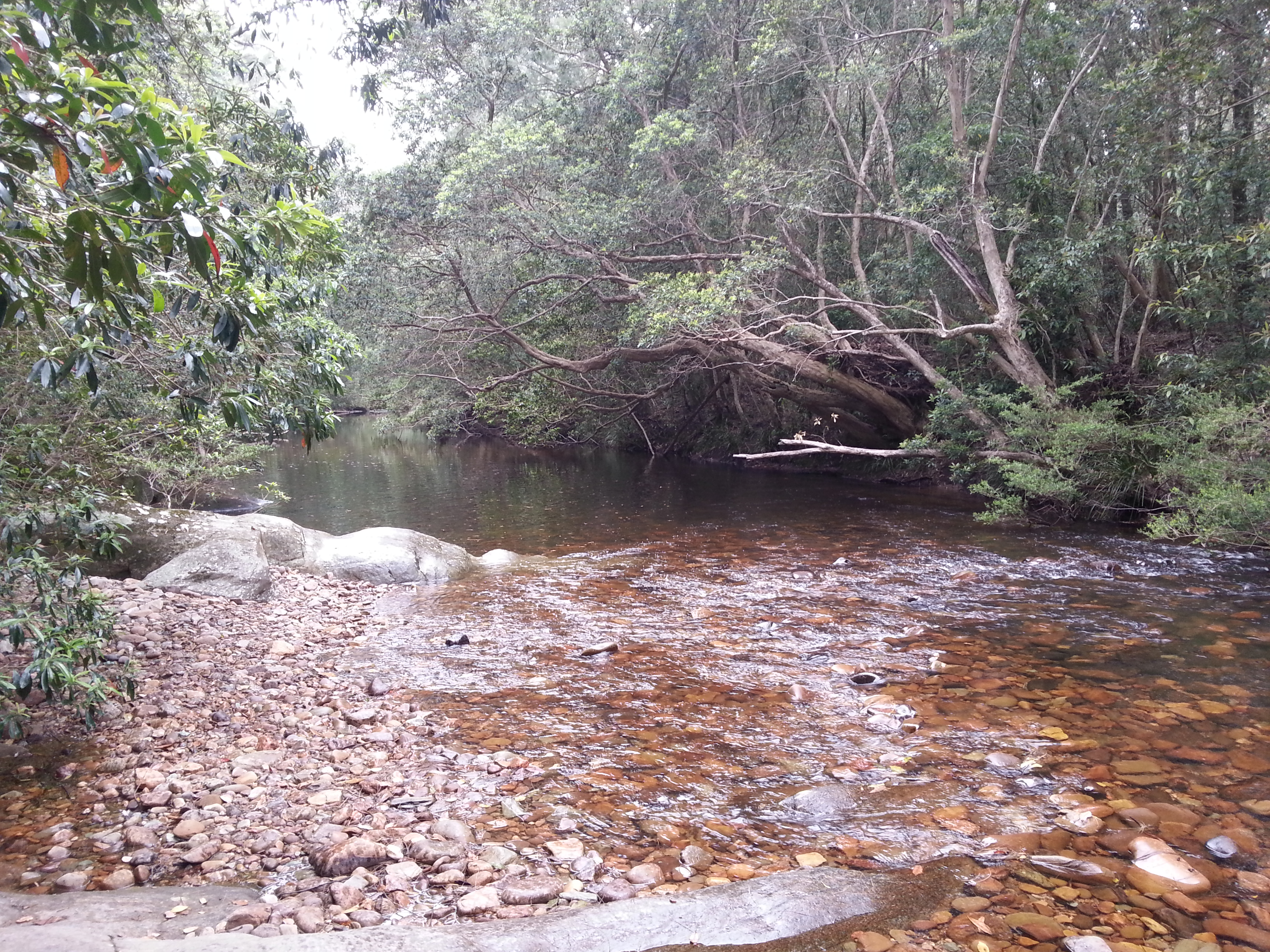
- The Yadboro River crossing on the Kaliana Ridge Track near Long Gully Campground, Budawang National Park.

Location
- Country: Australia
- State: New South Wales
- Region: South East Corner (IBRA), Southern Tablelands, South Coast
- Local government areas: Shoalhaven

Physical characteristics
- Source: Budawang Range
  - location: Currockbilly Mountain
  - elevation: 1,030 m (3,380 ft)
- Mouth: confluence with the Clyde River
  - location: near Campus Head
  - elevation: 70 m (230 ft)
- Length: 26 km (16 mi)

Basin features
- River system: Clyde River catchment
- Tributaries
  - right: Trapyard Creek
- National park: Budawang NP

Yadboro River, a perennial river of the Clyde River catchment, is located in the Southern Tablelands and the upper ranges of the South Coast regions of New South Wales, Australia.

== Course and features ==
Yadboro River rises below Currockbilly Mountain on the eastern slopes of the Budawang Range within Budawang National Park, east northeast of Braidwood, and flows generally northerly parallel to the range, then east, joined by one minor tributary before reaching its confluence with the Clyde River at Campus Head, near Yadboro Flat. The river descends 965 metres (3,166 ft) over its 26 kilometres (16 mi) course.

== See also ==
- Rivers of New South Wales
- List of rivers of New South Wales (L–Z)
- List of rivers of Australia
