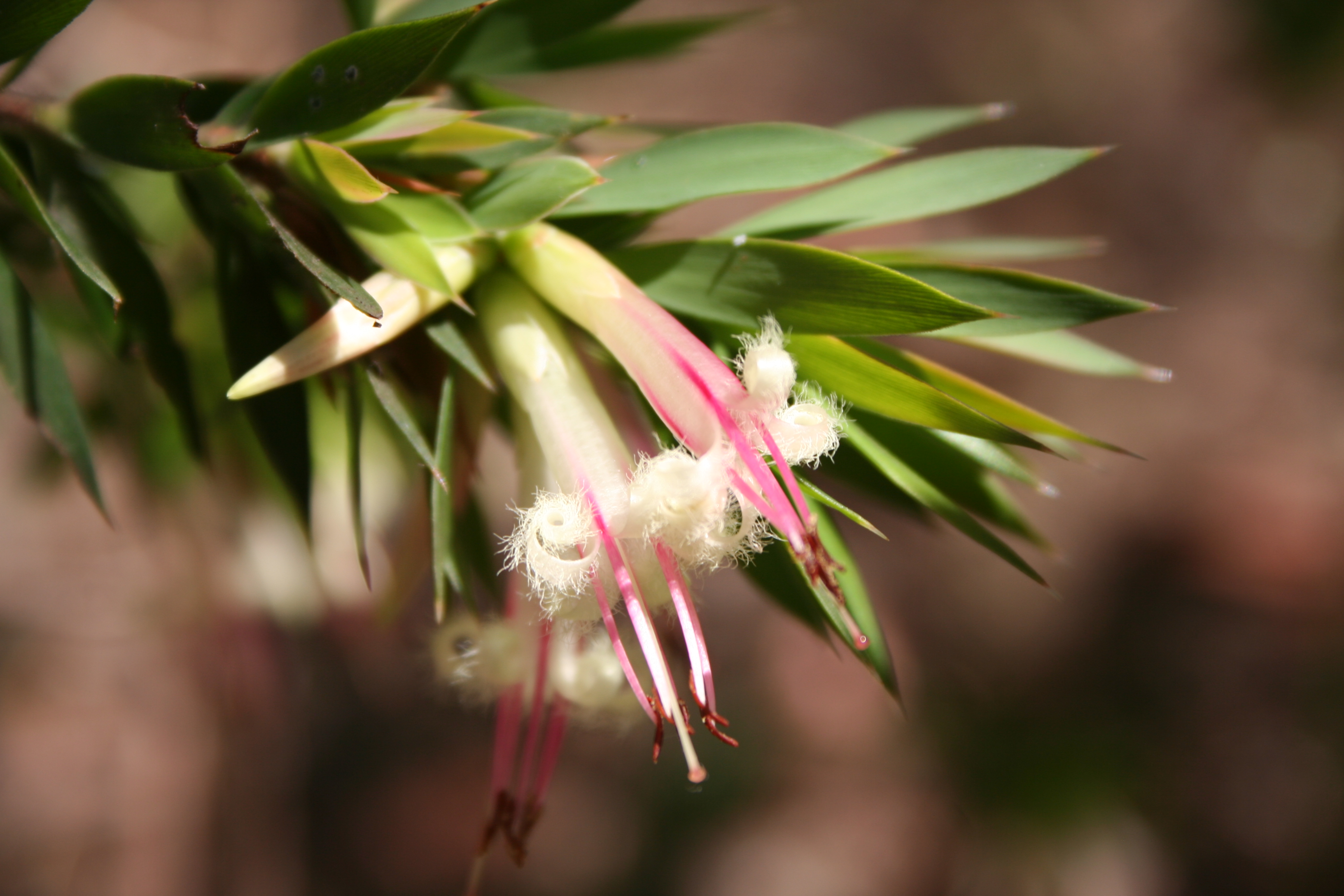
- Near Audley

Scientific classification
- Kingdom: Plantae
- Clade: Tracheophytes
- Clade: Angiosperms
- Clade: Eudicots
- Clade: Asterids
- Order: Ericales
- Family: Ericaceae
- Genus: Styphelia
- Species: S. angustifolia

Binomial name
- Styphelia angustifolia DC.

Synonyms
- Styphelia laeta var. angustifolia (DC.) Benth.

= Styphelia angustifolia =

Species of plant

Styphelia angustifolia is a species of flowering plant in the heath family Ericaceae and is endemic to eastern New South Wales. It is an erect shrub with lance-shaped to narrowly egg-shaped leaves and pale green, pendent flowers in summer.

== Description ==
Styphelia angustifolia is an erect shrub that typically grows to a height of up to about 1.8 m (5 ft 11 in), its branchlets velvety-hairy. The leaves are lance-shaped to narrowly egg-shaped, 10–29 mm (0.39–1.14 in) long, 1.4–4.8 mm (0.055–0.189 in) wide on a petiole up to 1 mm (0.039 in) long. The flowers are pendent with glabrous bracteoles 3.0–4.4 mm (0.12–0.17 in) long at the base. The sepals are 8.0–9.7 mm (0.31–0.38 in) long and the petals form a tube 15.4–18.9 mm (0.61–0.74 in) long, the lobes 11.5–14.3 mm (0.45–0.56 in) long. The stamen filaments are 8.4–10.5 mm (0.33–0.41 in) long. Flowering mainly occurs from December to February and the fruit is 6–7 mm (0.24–0.28 in) long and ridged.

== Taxonomy ==
Styphelia angustifolia was first formally described in 1839 by Augustin Pyramus de Candolle in his Prodromus Systematis Naturalis Regni Vegetabilis. The specific epithet (angustifolia) means "narrow-leaved".

== Distribution and habitat ==
This styphelia grows in forest on sandstone, mainly from the lower Blue Mountains to Pigeon House Mountain, but also in the Warialda district, in eastern New South Wales.
