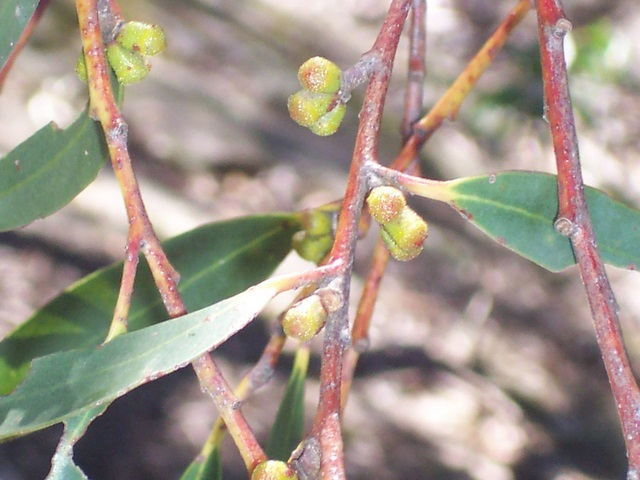
- Eucalyptus triflora at Pigeon House Mountain

Scientific classification
- Kingdom: Plantae
- Clade: Embryophytes
- Clade: Tracheophytes
- Clade: Angiosperms
- Clade: Eudicots
- Clade: Rosids
- Order: Myrtales
- Family: Myrtaceae
- Genus: Eucalyptus
- Species: E. triflora

Binomial name
- Eucalyptus triflora Maiden & Blakely

= Eucalyptus triflora =

Pigeon House ash

Species of eucalyptus

Eucalyptus triflora, commonly known as Pigeon House ash or three-flowered ash, is a species of small tree that is endemic to a small area of New South Wales. It has smooth bark, lance-shaped or curved adult leaves, flower buds usually in groups of three, white flowers and urn-shaped fruit.

== Description ==
Eucalyptus triflora is a tree that typically grows to a height of 12–15 m (39–49 ft) and forms a lignotuber. It has smooth white to cream-coloured bark with insect scribbles, sometimes with rough dark grey bark on the base of older trees. Young plants and coppice regrowth have glossy green leaves that are paler on the lower surface, lance-shaped or curved, 40–110 mm (1.6–4.3 in) long and 15–40 mm (0.59–1.57 in) wide. Adult leaves are arranged alternately, the same shade of glossy green on both sides, lance-shaped or curved, 70–160 mm (2.8–6.3 in) long and 8–30 mm (0.31–1.18 in) wide, tapering to a petiole 7–18 mm (0.28–0.71 in) long. The flower buds are arranged in leaf axils usually in groups of three on an unbranched peduncle 3–7 mm (0.12–0.28 in) long, the individual buds sessile. Mature buds are oblong, 7–8 mm (0.28–0.31 in) long and 4–5 mm (0.16–0.20 in) wide with a rounded to conical operculum. Flowering occurs from December to March and the flowers are white. The fruit is a woody, urn-shaped to barrel-shaped capsule 6–11 mm (0.24–0.43 in) long and 7–12 mm (0.28–0.47 in) wide with the valves at or below rim level.

== Taxonomy and naming ==
Pigeon House ash was first formally described in 1907 by Joseph Maiden in his book The Forest Flora of New South Wales from specimens collected from the top of Pigeon House Mountain by Richard Hind Cambage. Maiden gave it the name Eucalyptus virgata var. triflora. In 1934,William Blakely raised the variety to species status as Eucalyptus triflora. The specific epithet (triflora) is from Latin words meaning "three" and "flowered".

== Distribution and habitat ==
Eucalyptus triflora usually grows between sandstone boulders in higher areas, sometimes in heath, open forest or woodland. It is found in a few disjunct areas from near Nerriga to Pigeon House Mountain, in parts of the Deua National Park and near Yalwal.
