= Reidsdale =

- Town
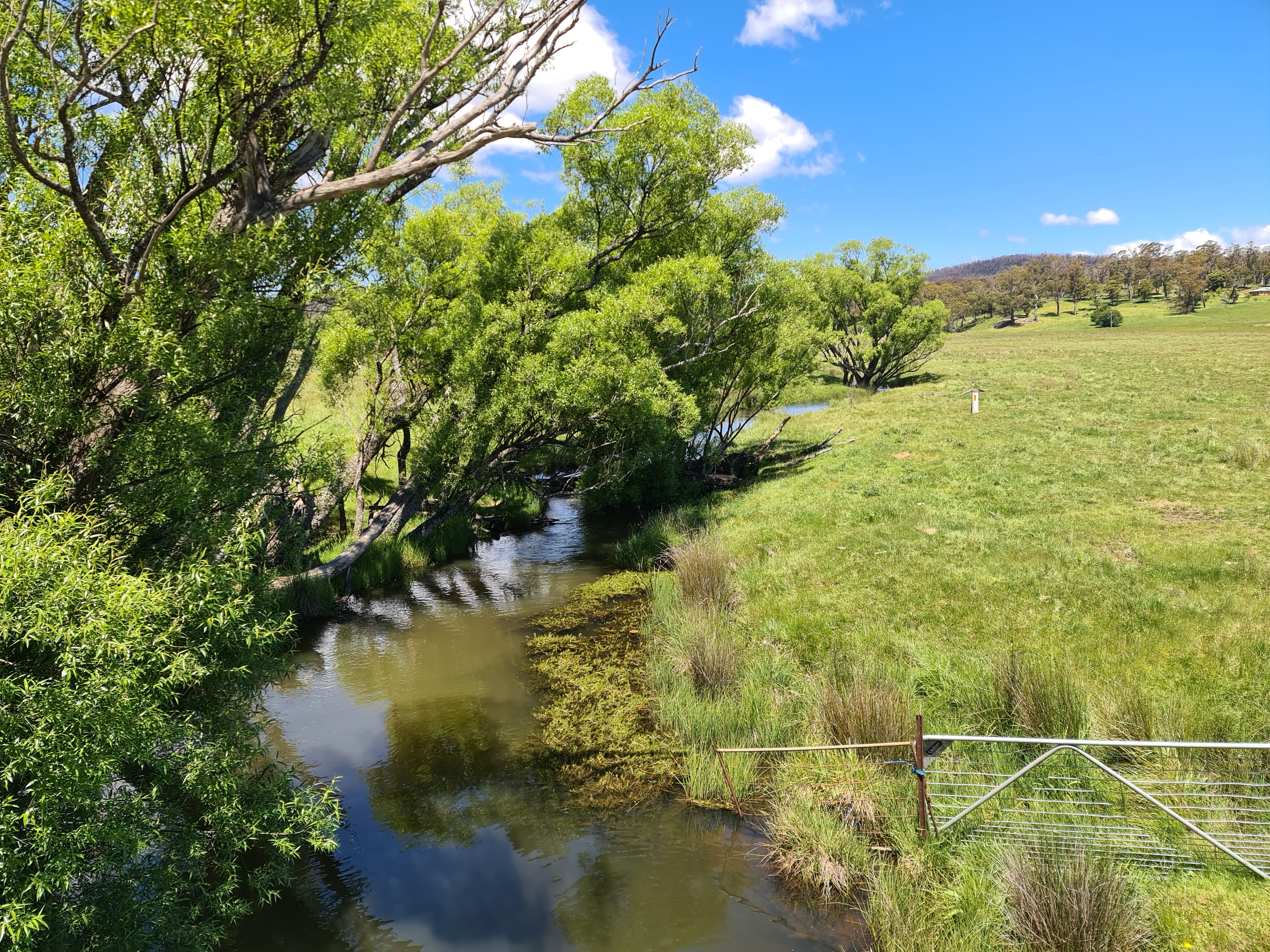
- Jembaicumbene Creek in Reidsdale

- Coordinates: 35°34′54″S 149°51′04″E
- Country: Australia
- State: New South Wales
- Region: Southern Tablelands
- LGA: Queanbeyan-Palerang Regional Council
- Location: 17 km (11 mi) SE of Braidwood; 105 km (65 mi) SE of Canberra; 91 km (57 mi) ESE of Queanbeyan; 78 km (48 mi) WNW of Batemans Bay; 300 km (190 mi) SW of Sydney

Government
  - State electorate: Monaro
  - Federal division: Eden-Monaro
- Elevation: 681 m (2,234 ft)

Population
  - Total: 121 (SAL 2021)
- Postcode: 2622
- County: St Vincent
- Parish: Seymour
Localities around Reidsdale
Jembaicumbene	Braidwood	Monga
Majors Creek	Reidsdale	Monga
Araluen	Araluen	Monga

Reidsdale is a locality in the Queanbeyan–Palerang Regional Council, New South Wales, Australia. It is located about 17 km southeast of Braidwood. At the 2016 census, it had a population of 125. It had a school from 1883 to 1923 and from 1943 to 1946, operating as a "public school" until 1922 and then as a "provisional" school".
