= Clyde River (New South Wales) =

River in Australia

Coordinates: 35°25′S 150°14′E

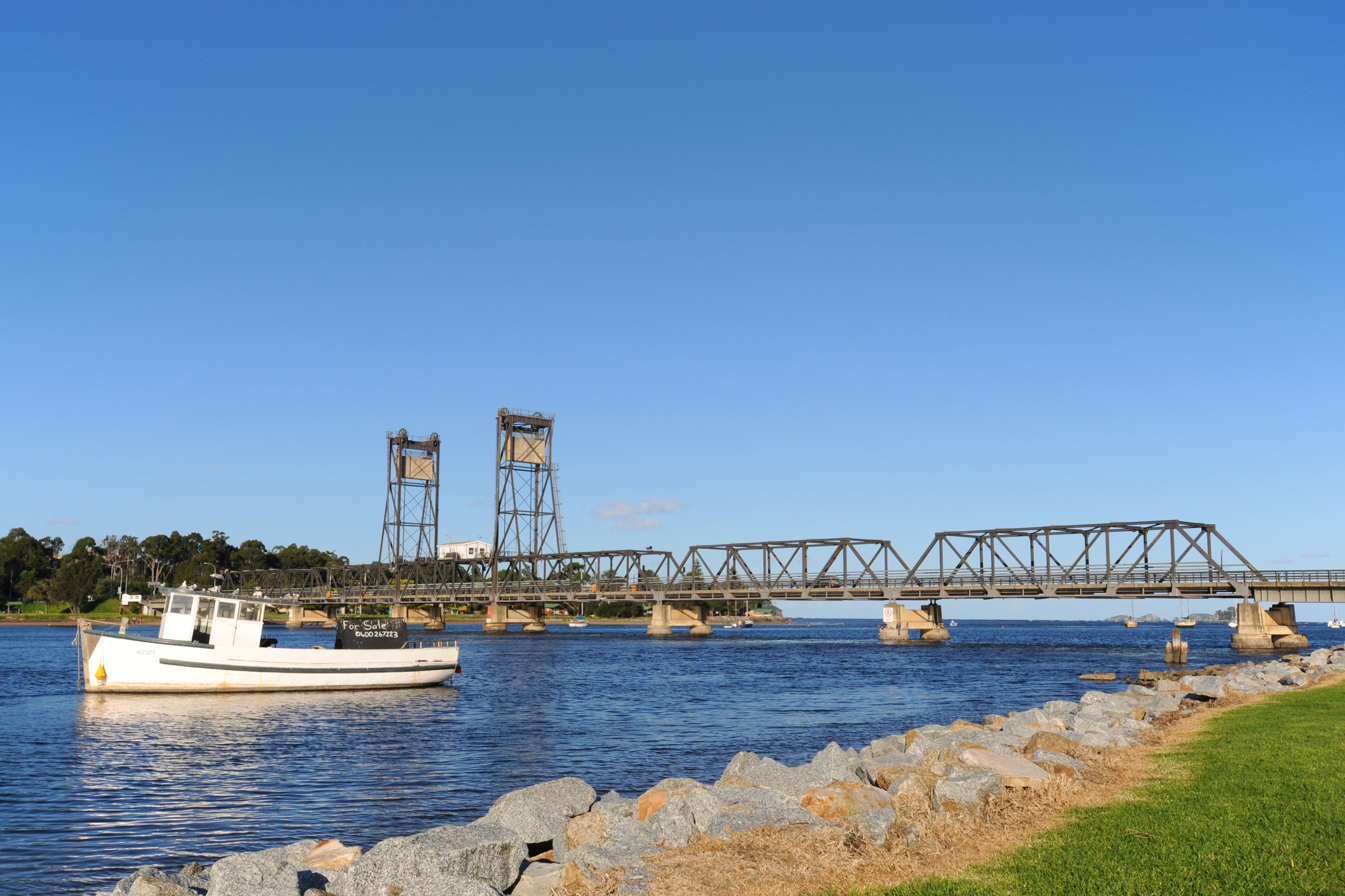
- Clyde River flowing under the bridge at Batemans Bay
- Etymology: River Clyde, Scotland (1821)
- Native name: Bhundoo (Dhurga)

Location
- Country: Australia
- State: New South Wales
- Region: South East Corner (IBRA), South Coast
- Local government areas: Shoalhaven, Eurobodalla
- City: Batemans Bay

Physical characteristics
- Source: Budawang Mountains, Great Dividing Range
  - location: near Kangaroo Hill, within Budawang National Park
  - elevation: 597 m (1,959 ft)
- Mouth: Tasman Sea, South Pacific Ocean
  - location: Batemans Bay
- Length: 102 km (63 mi)
- Basin size: 1,723 km^{2} (665 sq mi)
- Depth
  - average: 3 m (9.8 ft)

Basin features
- Tributaries
  - left: Claydons Creek, Pigeon House Creek, Boyne Creek, Cockwhy Creek
  - right: Yadboro River, Crooked Creek (Clyde River)|Crooked Creek, Bimberamala River, Currowan Creek, Buckenbowra River

The Clyde River (Dhurga: Bhundoo) is an open intermediate tide-dominated drowned valley estuary or perennial river that flows into the Tasman Sea at Batemans Bay, located in the South Coast region of New South Wales, Australia.

== Course and features ==
The Clyde River rises below Kangaroo Hill in the Budawang Range, part of the Great Dividing Range, within Budawang National Park, south of the locality of Sassafras, and flows generally southwards parallel to the east coast, joined by nine tributaries including the Bimberamala, Yadboro, and Buckenbowra rivers, before turning east and reaching its mouth of the Tasman Sea at Batemans Bay. The river descends 601 metres (1,972 ft) over its 102 kilometres (63 mi) course.

The lower reaches of the Clyde River form a substantial estuary up to 30 kilometres (19 mi) from its mouth which is navigable by small vessels to Nelligen, with a tidal ebb of up to 1.28 metres (4 ft 2 in). The coastal estuary covers a catchment area of 1,723 square kilometres (665 sq mi) and contains approximately 50,737 megalitres (1,791.8×10^{6} cu ft) of water over an estimated surface area of 17.5 square kilometres (6.8 sq mi); and at an average depth of 3 metres (9.8 ft).

The river is one of the last major rivers in eastern Australia that has not been dammed. Porters Creek, a tributary of one of the Clyde's tributaries, Pigeon House Creek, is dammed by the Porters Creek Dam, which supplies water to coastal towns.

In its upper reaches, the river forms within the Budawang National Park; while in its lower reaches, the river flows through the Clyde River National Park.

Water quality of the basin is very good. The upper catchment is heavily timbered (state forests and national parks); there is a small amount of logging in the Yadboro State Forest. There are no polluting industries in its catchment, nor any sewage outflows, and thus the river has a reputation for the cleanest, least polluted waters of any major river in eastern Australia.

Salinity in the estuary of the Clyde River decreases with distance from the sea, giving rise to suitable conditions for oyster farming.

== History and naming ==
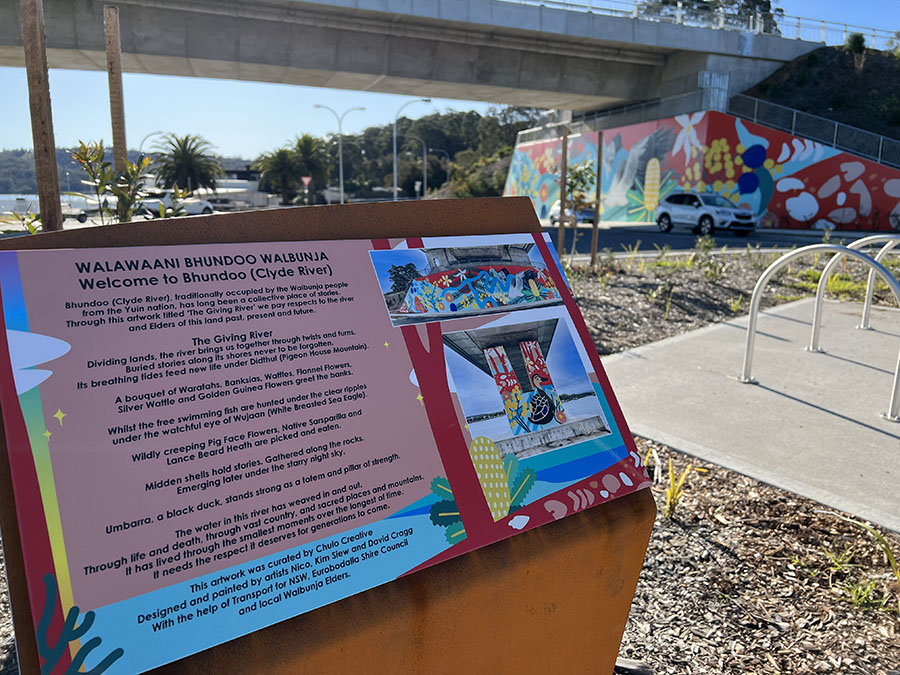
A decorative sign on the northern foreshore at the completion of the Batemans Bay Bridge replacement project telling an Indigenous story of the Bhundoo (Clyde River).

The region was first occupied by the Walbunja people from the Yuin nation. Their name for the river, Bhundoo, means "Deep Water".

The river was given the name Clyde River after the River Clyde in Glasgow, Scotland, by Lieutenant Robert Johnston, who navigated the river aboard the cutter Snapper on 1 December 1821.

== Crossings ==
The river crossings, from its headwaters to its river mouth, include:

- Yadboro Flats bridge, from Yadboro Road to Western Distributor Road, downstream from the junction with Yadboro River
- Clyde Ridge Road bridge
- Shallow Crossing, on The River Road, a concrete causeway/ford, at the tidal limit of the Clyde estuary
- Nelligen Bridge, on the Kings Highway
- Batemans Bay bridge, on the Princes Highway. The old steel truss bridge has been replaced by a new, higher bridge with two lanes for traffic in each direction. The new bridge formally opened on 27 March 2021, after which the old bridge was dismantled. The new bridge is designed to ease traffic congestion and delays caused by the limitations of the old bridge, which only had one narrow lane in each direction. In addition, the old bridge had a central section which is raised to allow tall watercraft to pass underneath. This meant regular delays for local and holiday traffic which was frequently backed up for several kilometres as a result.

== Gallery ==
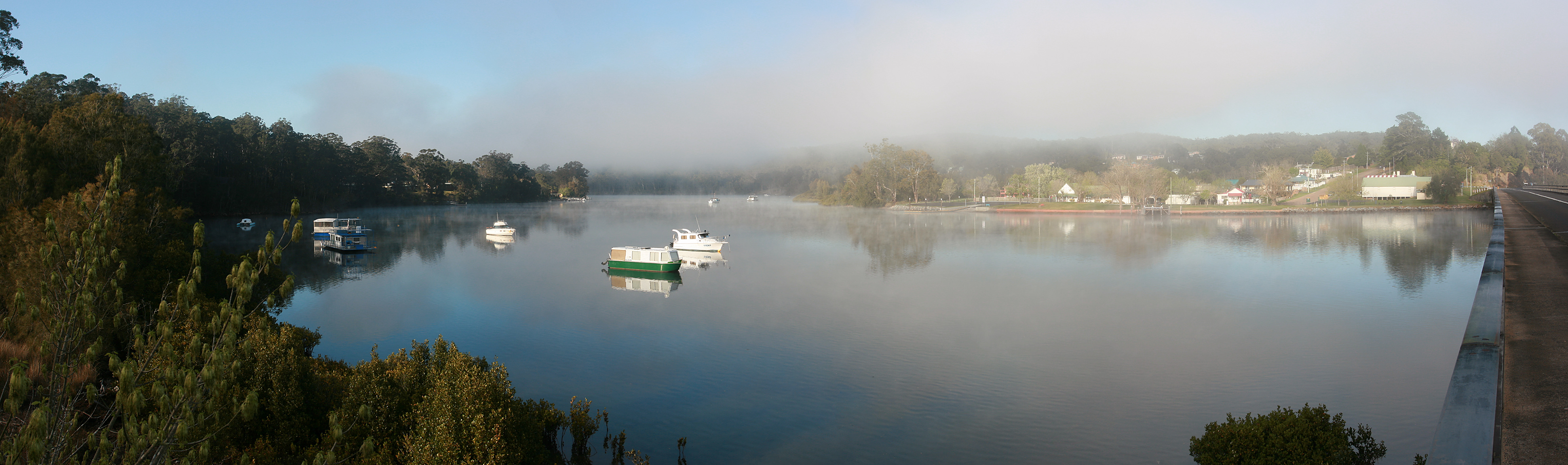
Early morning mist on the Clyde River at Nelligen, 2008.

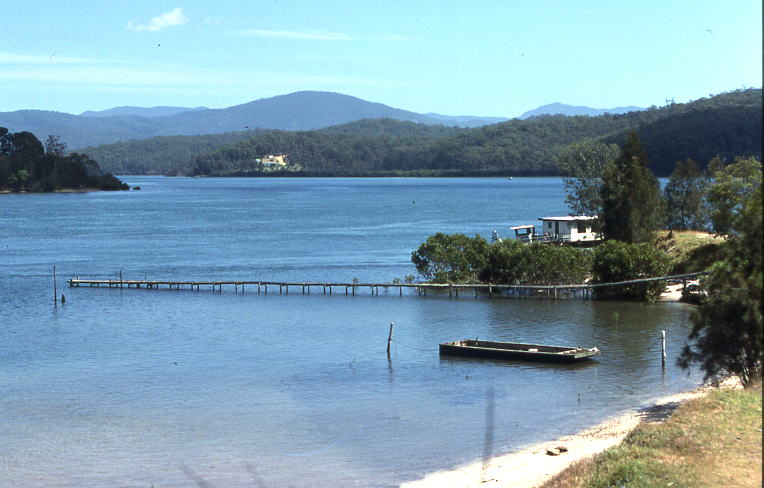
The Clyde River, looking upstream from Batemans Bay towards the Budawang Range, 2009.

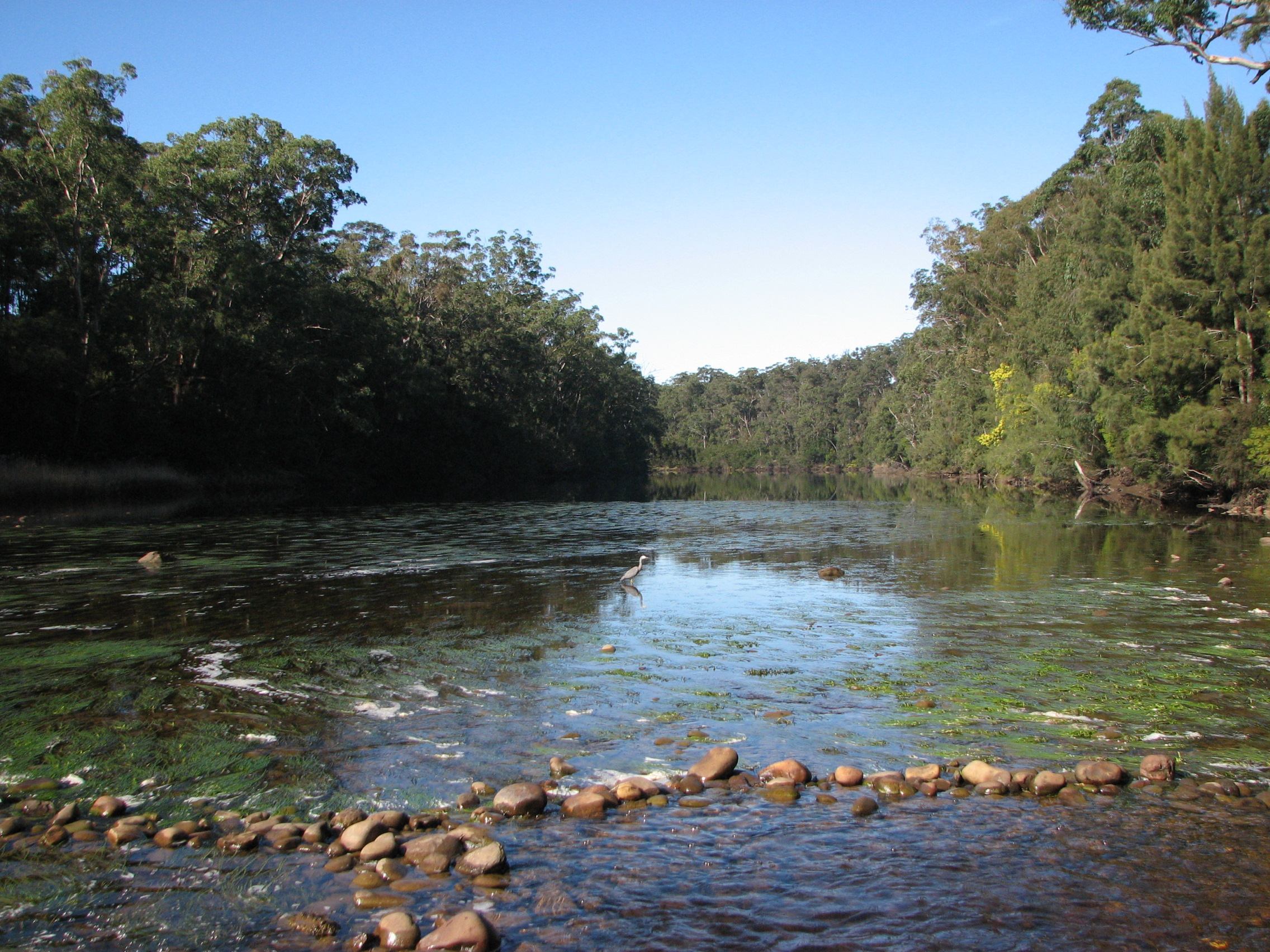
At Shallow Crossing, the River Road crosses the Clyde River at a concrete ford.

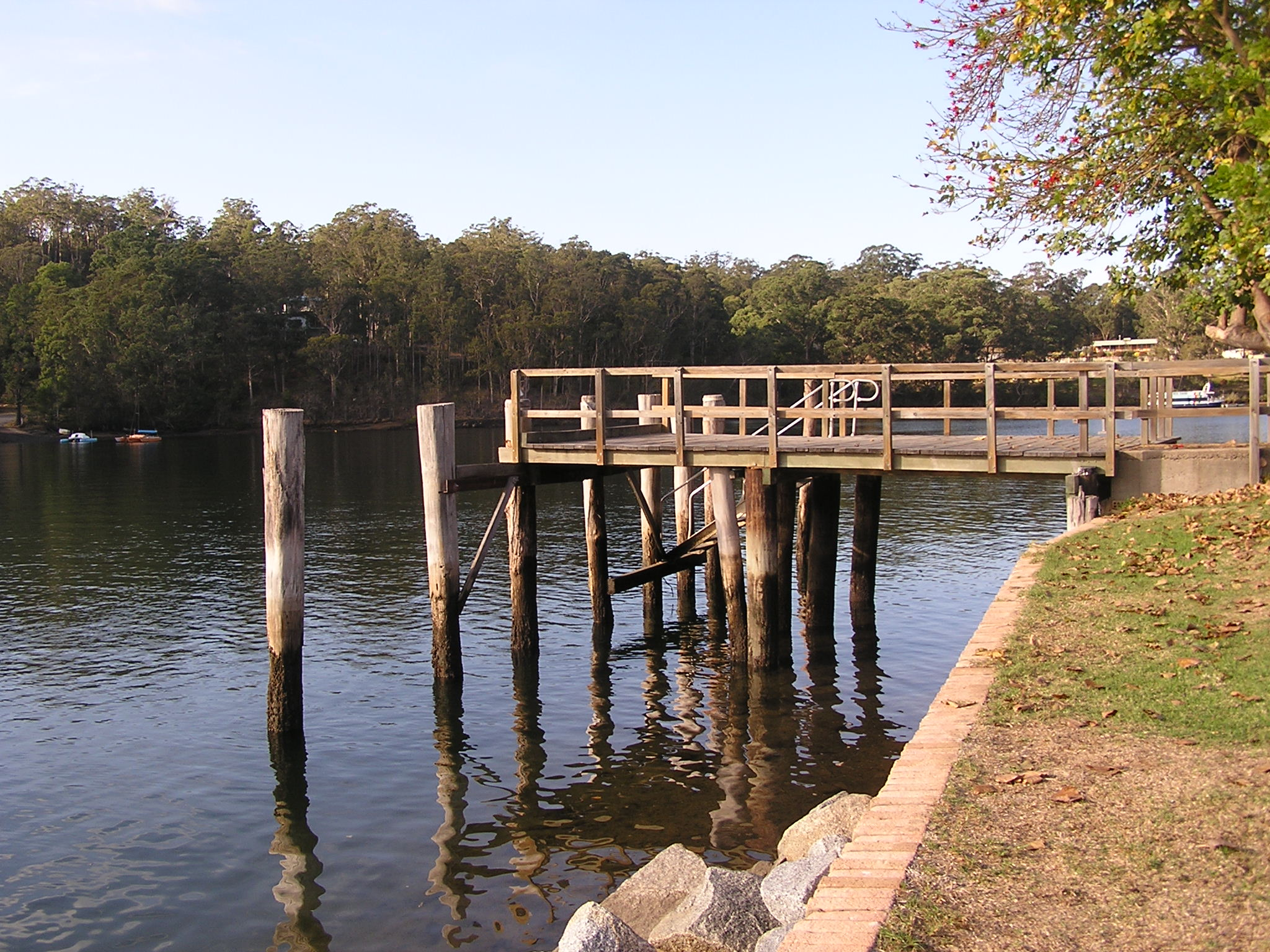
Wharf at Nelligen formerly used by the Illawarra Steam Navigation Company.

== See also ==
- Rivers of New South Wales
- List of rivers of New South Wales (A–K)
- List of rivers of Australia
