= Clyde River National Park =

National park in New South Wales, Australia

- IUCN category II (national park)
- Location within New South Wales
- Location: New South Wales
- Nearest city: Batemans Bay
- Coordinates: 35°40′42″S 150°08′57″E
- Area: 10.91 km^{2} (4.21 sq mi)
- Established: 2000
- Governing body: NSW National Parks & Wildlife Service
- Website: http://www.nationalparks.nsw.gov.au

Clyde River is a national park in south-eastern New South Wales (Australia) between Batemans Bay and Nelligen. It includes 9 km of river frontage to the Clyde River, bounded on three sides by the Clyde River and on the northeast by the Kings Highway. It was created from a part of Benandarah State Forest; in 2000 10.91 km^{2} of the state forest was set aside as a national park. The park forms part of the Ulladulla to Merimbula Important Bird Area, identified as such by BirdLife International because of its importance for swift parrots.

Primarily, this is the land of the Walbunja people.

== See also ==
- Protected areas of New South Wales
