= Bimberamala National Park =

National park in New South Wales, Australia

- IUCN category II (national park)
- Location within New South Wales
- Location: New South Wales
- Nearest city: Batemans Bay
- Coordinates: 35°29′13″S 150°06′50″E
- Area: 4,396 ha (16.97 sq mi)
- Established: 2001
- Governing body: NSW National Parks & Wildlife Service
- Website: http://www.nationalparks.nsw.gov.au/visit-a-park/parks/Bimberamala-National-Park

Bimberamala National Park is a national park in New South Wales, Australia. It is located thirty kilometres west of Batemans Bay and ten kilometres north of Kings Highway. This is a park of steep and wooded landscapes. The Bimberamala River flows through a deeply incised valley, creating a lot of water holes.

Five endangered animal species have found their habitat here.

== See also ==
- Protected areas of New South Wales
