= Monga National Park =

National park in Australia

- IUCN category II (national park)
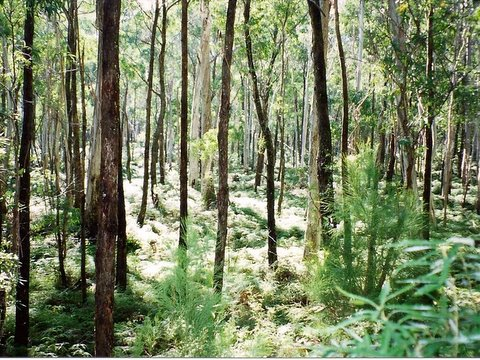
- Eucalyptus forest at Monga National Park

- Location within New South Wales
- Location: New South Wales
- Nearest city: Braidwood.
- Coordinates: 35°39′47″S 149°58′16″E
- Area: 251.44 km^{2} (97.08 sq mi)
- Established: 1 January 2001
- Governing body: NSW National Parks & Wildlife Service
- Website: Official website

The Monga National Park is a 251.44-square-kilometre (97.08 sq mi) national park located 230 kilometres (140 mi) south west of Sydney, New South Wales, Australia. The closest town nearby is Braidwood.

Monga features outstanding high altitude eucalyptus forest and temperate rainforest. It contains the Corn Trail, a historic bridle-track, built in the 1830s, that has been restored and reopened as a walking track.

In the park you can find many cultural sites of the Aboriginal peoples of Yuin and Walbunja.

The park has an elevation of 686 meters.

== Gallery ==
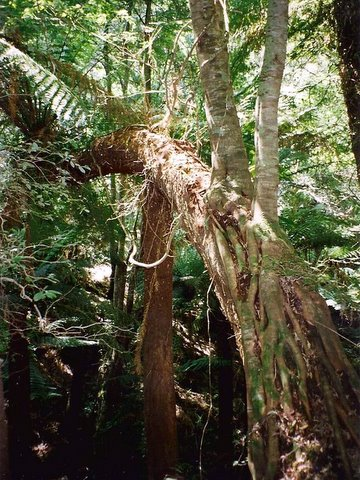
Pinkwood growing as a hemiepiphyte on a soft tree fern

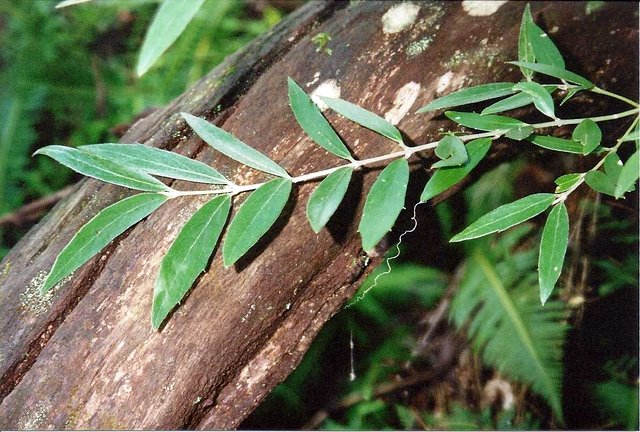
Southern sassafras, a seldom seen plant in New South Wales

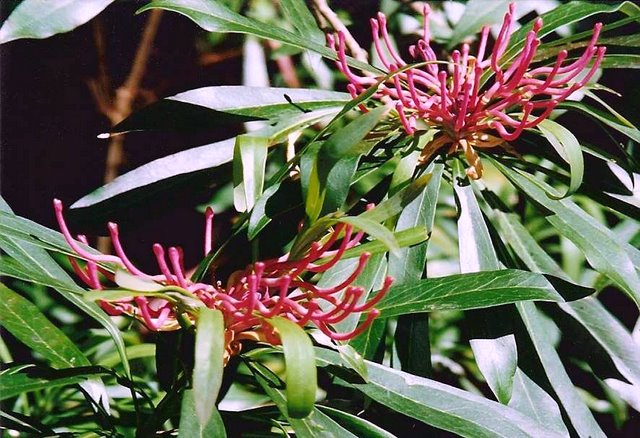
The Monga Waratah

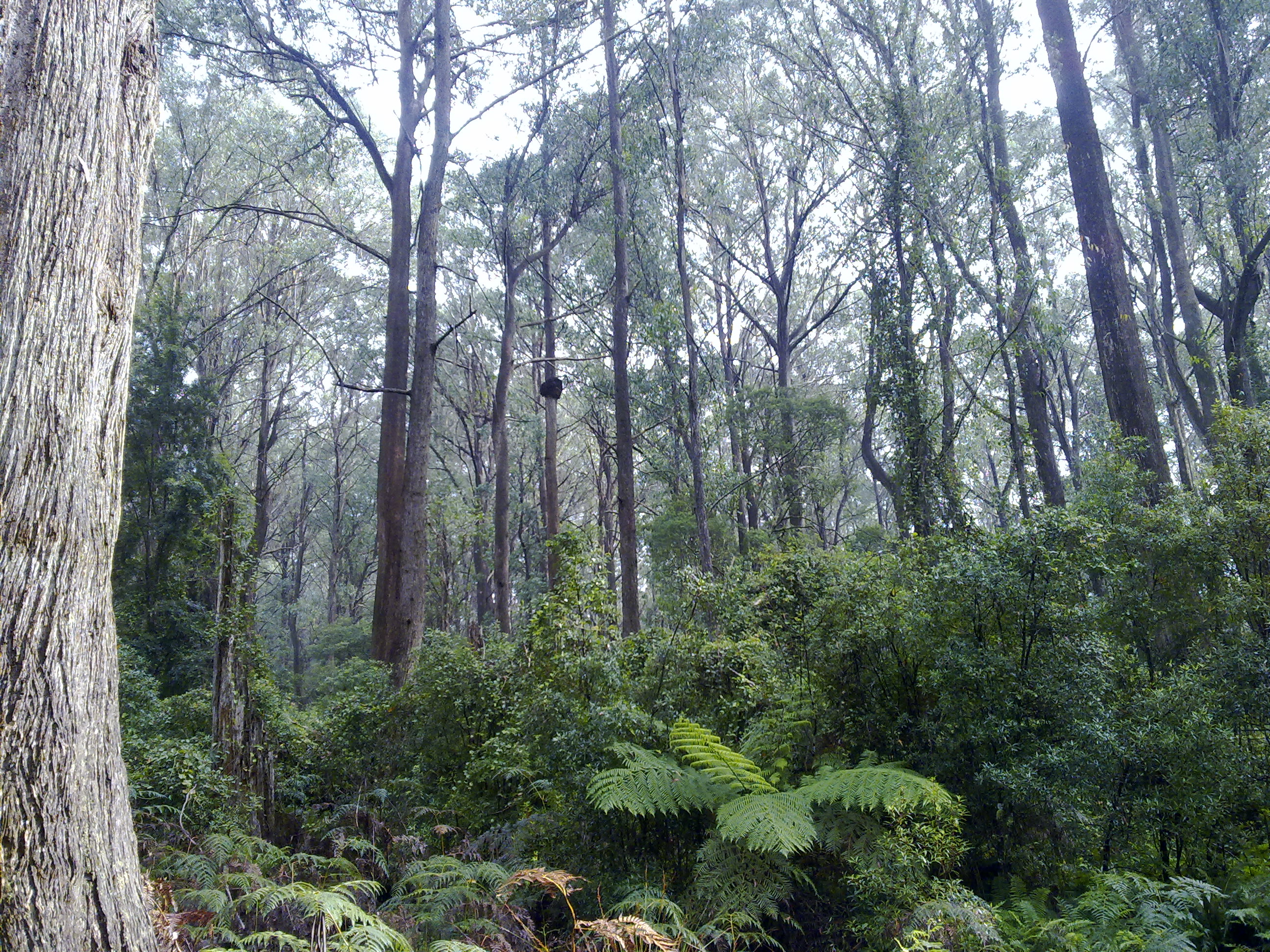
A stand of Eucalyptus trees

== See also ==
- Protected areas of New South Wales
