= Pigeon House Mountain =

Mountain in New South Wales, Australia

- Aboriginal: Didthul
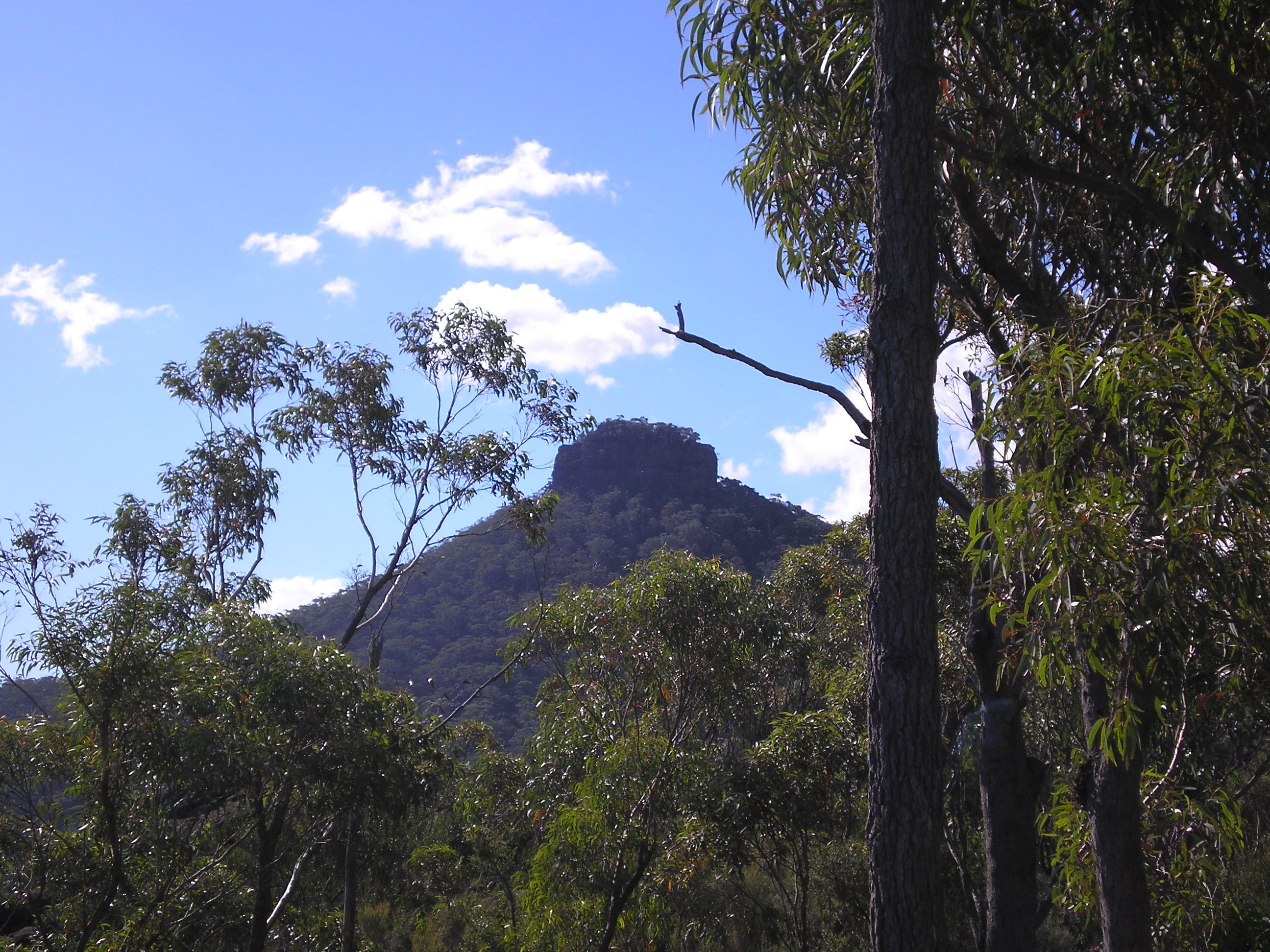

Highest point
- Elevation: 720 m (2,360 ft)
- Coordinates: 35°20′57.44″S 150°15′53.94″E

Geography
- Location within New South Wales
- Location: New South Wales, Australia
- Parent range: Budawang Range

Pigeon House Mountain (Aboriginal: Didthul) is a mountain at an elevation of 720 metres (2,360 ft) AHD on the Budawang Range that is situated within the Morton National Park, located on the South Coast region of New South Wales, Australia.

The prominent remnant of a two tier sandstone structure, the nearest town is Milton. Pigeon House Mountain is a popular walking destination, taking an average of three to four hours for a complete ascent and descent from the car park.

Pigeon House Mountain is home to eastern grey kangaroos and superb lyrebirds.

== Etymology ==
The mountain was first seen by Captain James Cook at 7 a.m. on 21 April 1770, during his voyage of discovery along Australia's eastern coast. Cook described -

a remarkable peaked hill which resembled a square dovehouse with a dome on top and for that reason I called it Pigeon House.

The Aboriginal name for the mountain is Didthul, Didhol, or Dithol which means "woman's breast" on account of the distinctive shape of the mountain.

== Gallery ==
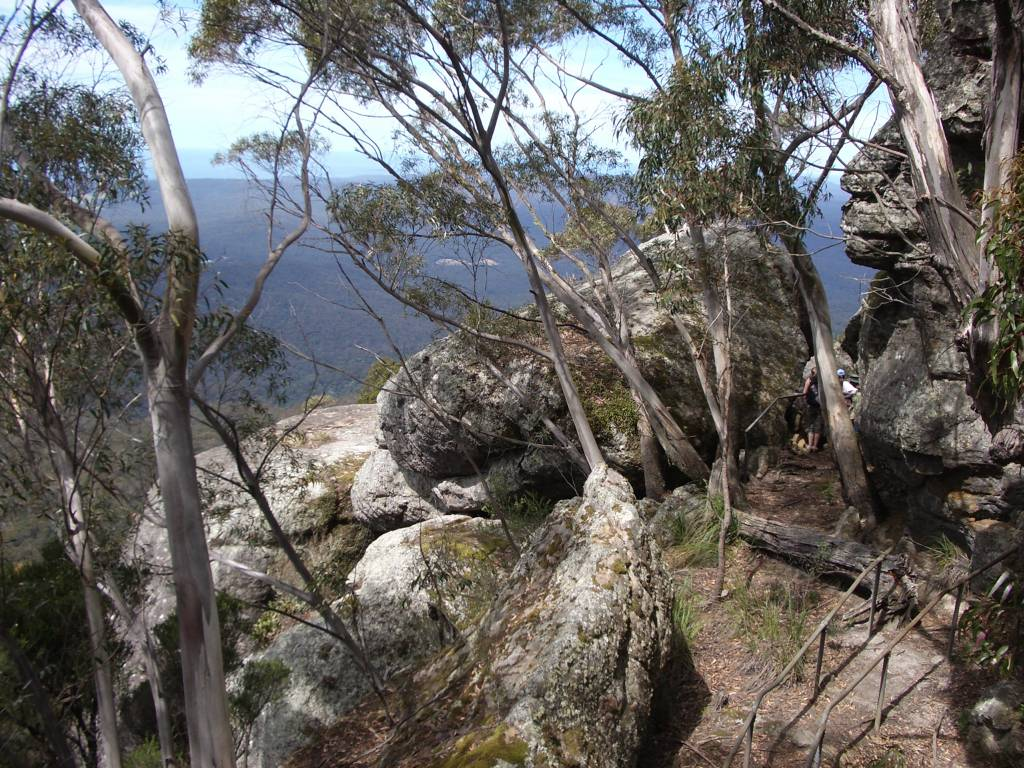
The summit

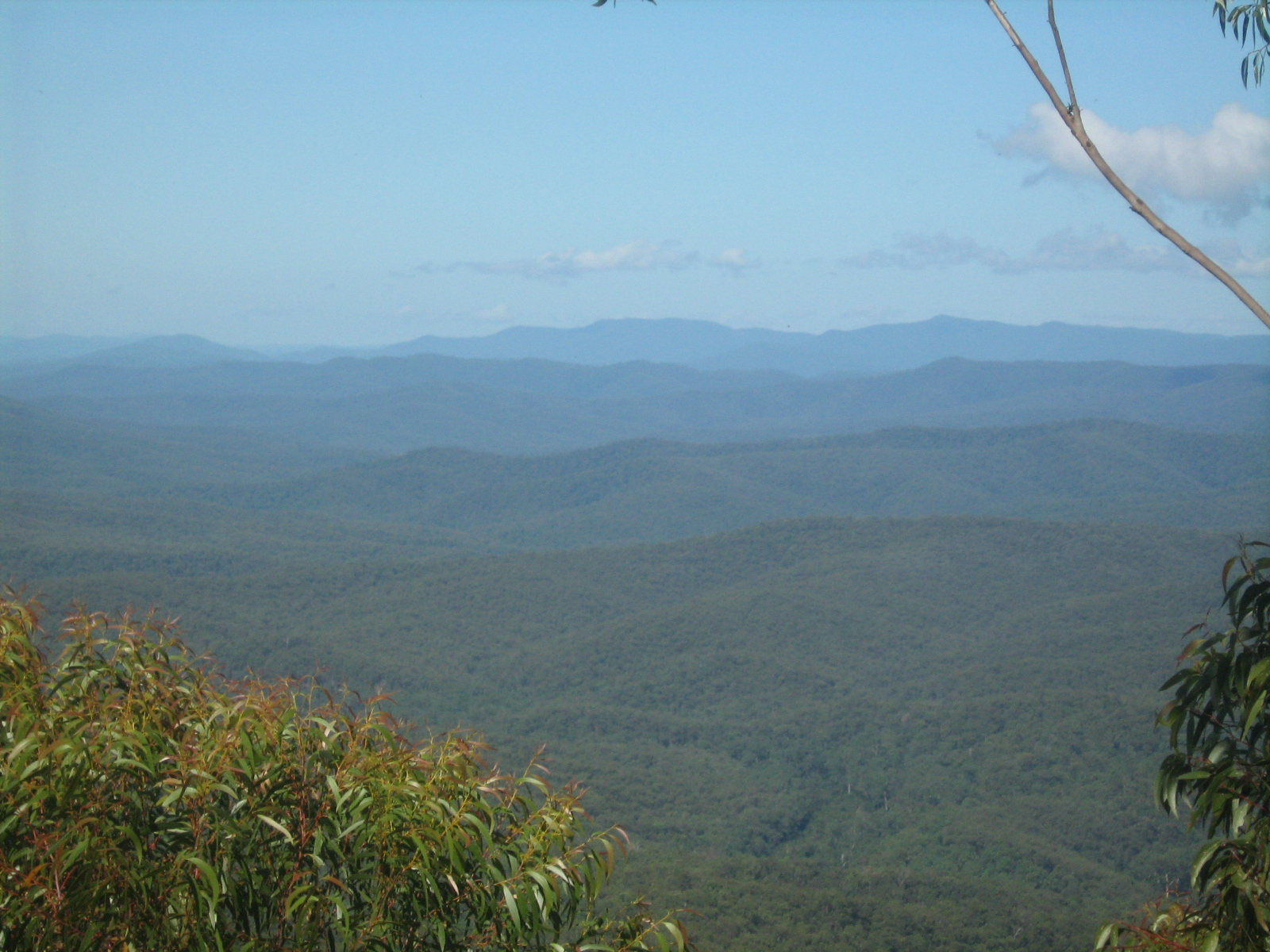
View from the summit

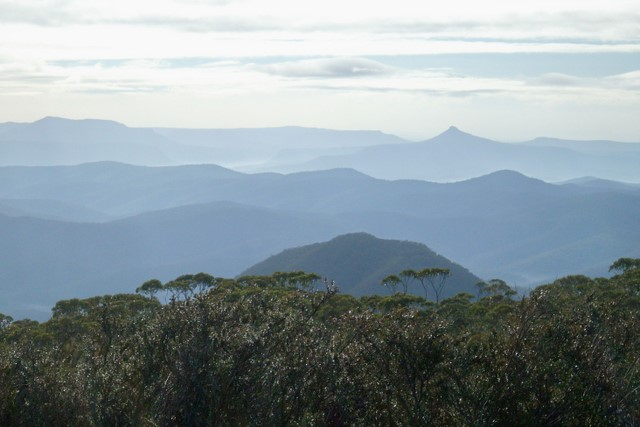
As seen from Mount Budawang (Pigeon House on right horizon)

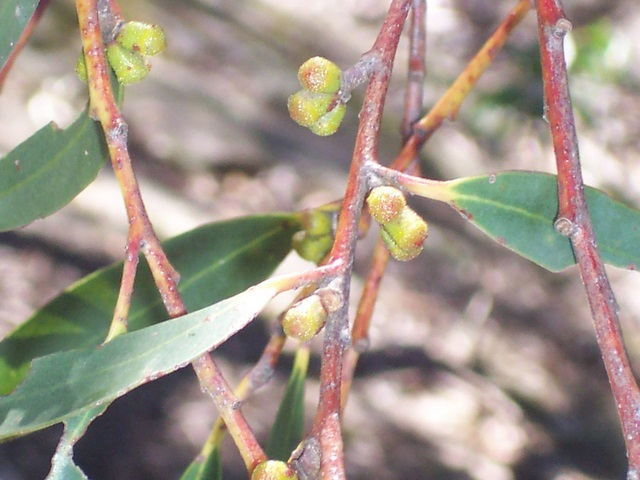
Pigeon House ash on Pigeon House Mountain

== See also ==
- Breast-shaped hill
