= Budawang National Park =

National park in New South Wales, Australia

- IUCN category Ib (wilderness area)
- Location within New South Wales
- Location: New South Wales
- Nearest city: Braidwood
- Coordinates: 35°25′12″S 150°02′41″E
- Area: 237 km^{2} (92 sq mi)
- Established: 23 September 1977
- Governing body: New South Wales National Parks and Wildlife Service
- Website: http://www.nationalparks.nsw.gov.au/visit-a-park/parks/Budawang-National-Park

Budawang National Park is a national park in New South Wales, Australia, located approximately 200 kilometres (120 mi) southwest of Sydney and 25 kilometres (16 mi) north of Batemans Bay. It contains part of the Budawang Mountain Range.

Budawang National Park is named after Mount Budawang. The mountain itself derives from the Aboriginal word 'Buddawong'. The vantage point afforded by the mountain was originally used to make signal fires.

The Budawang National Park is largely isolated. Its terrain is steep and rugged. The park comprises high-elevation moist forests.

== Landscape ==
Most of the Budawang National Park lies within the southern Budawang Range. This range is characterized by rugged terrain, steep slopes and deeply incised valleys.

== Wildlife ==
Budawang National Park's diverse landscape has created pockets of unique habitats where several plant and animal species survive.

=== Plants ===
The middle and high slopes of the hills in the park are covered in cool temperate rainforest. In the lower elevations, which are drained by small rivers and streams, the dominant vegetation is dry rainforest trees and ironwood.

=== Animals ===
The park supports good populations of swamp wallabies, greater gliders, and potoroos. Eastern grey kangaroos, common wombats, honeyeaters and white-throated tree creepers inhabit the open forest and woodland. Other notable bird species include green catbirds and lyrebirds.

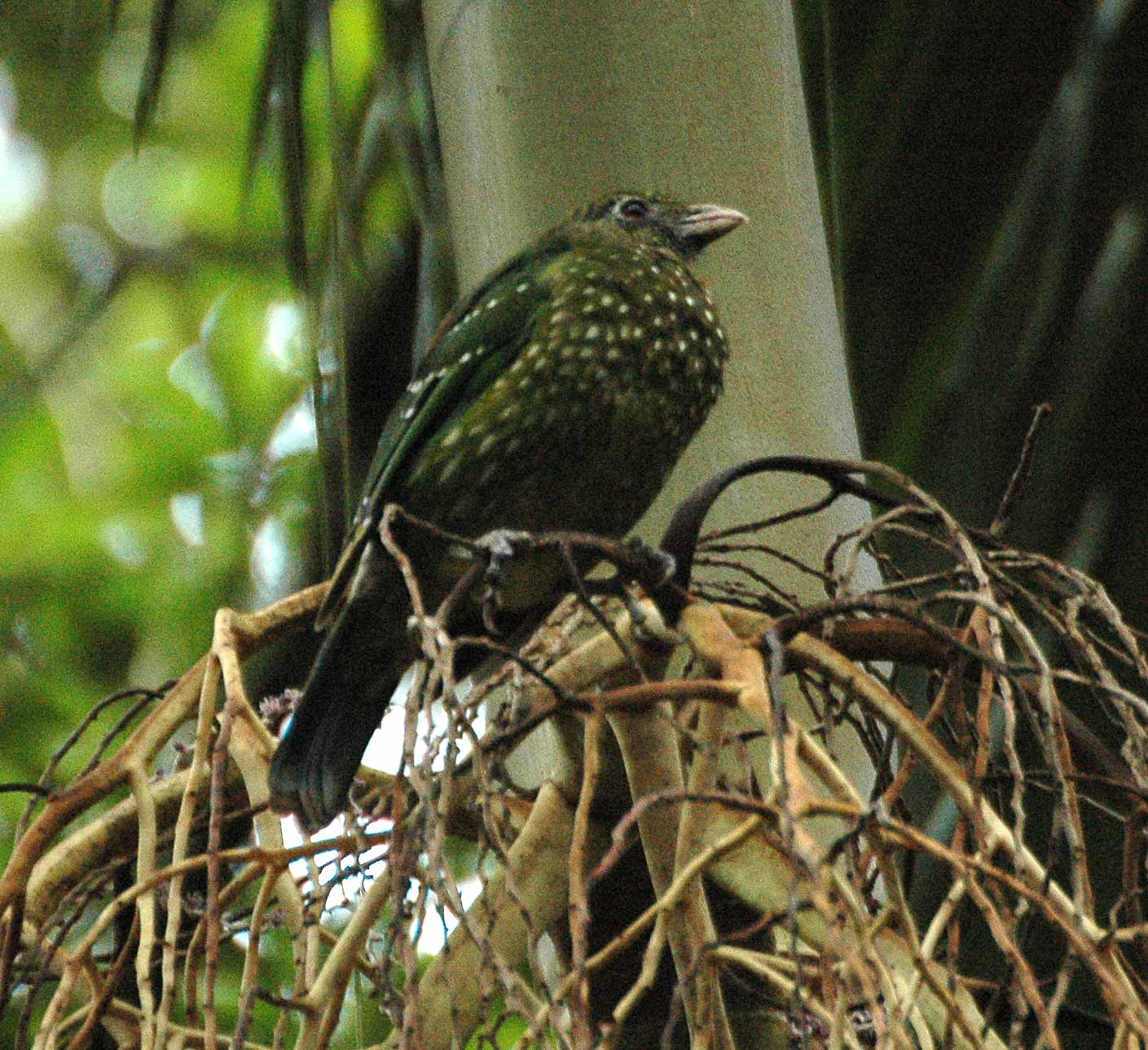
Green catbird

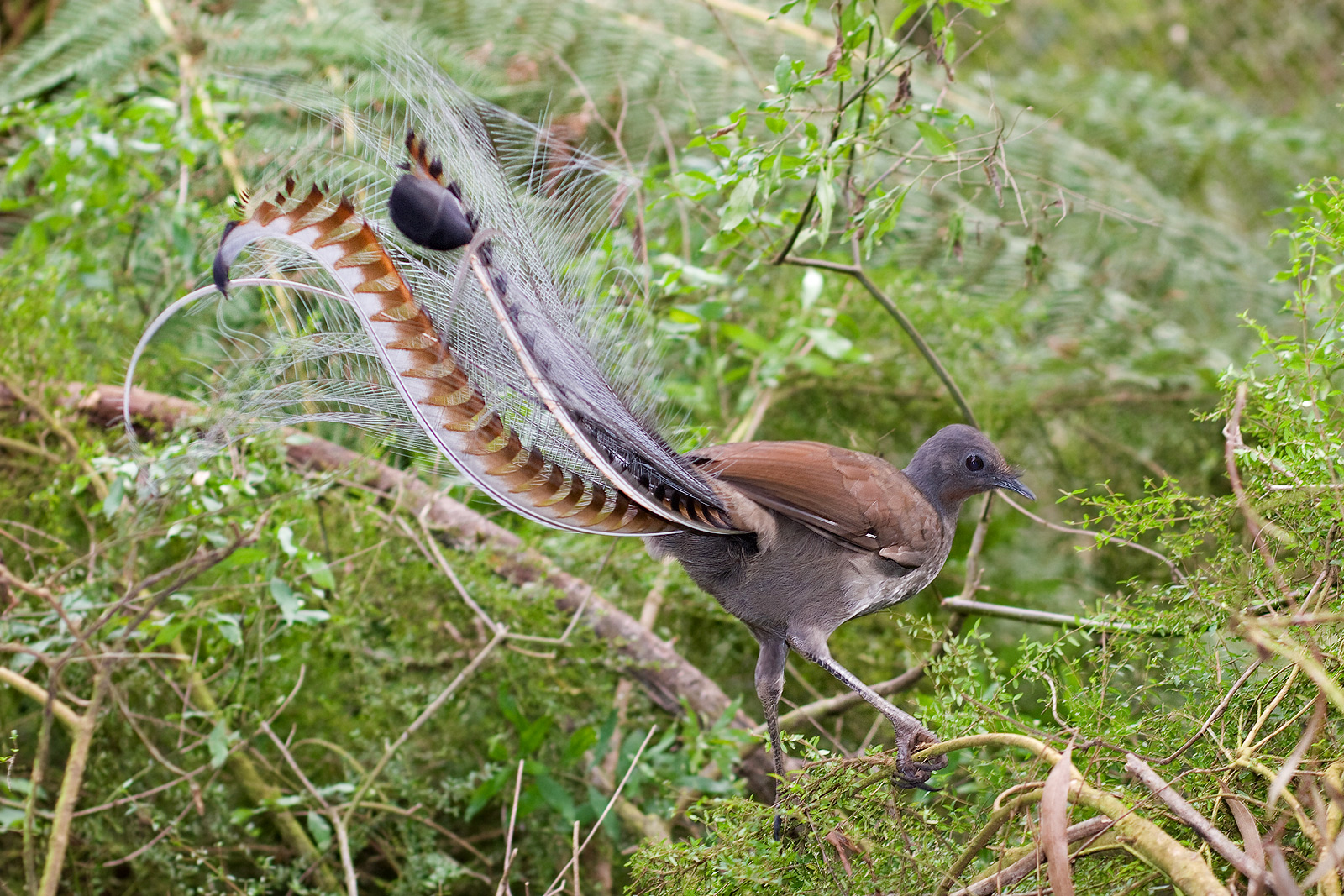
Lyrebird

== Gallery ==
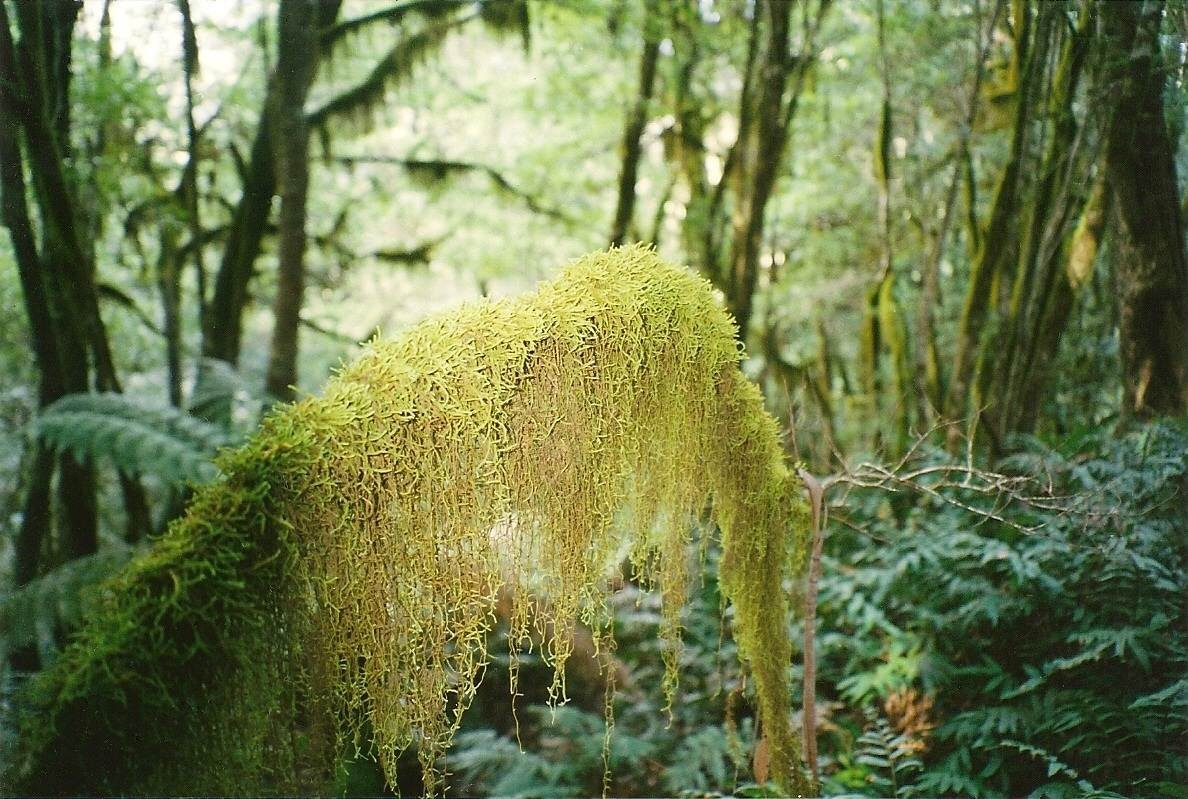
Papillaria Cloudforest.

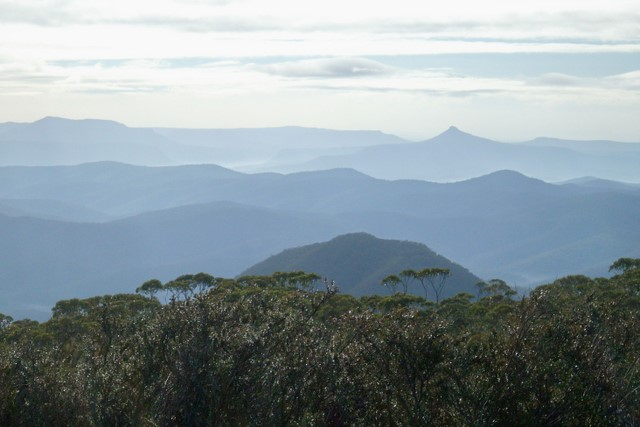
The view from Mount Budawang.

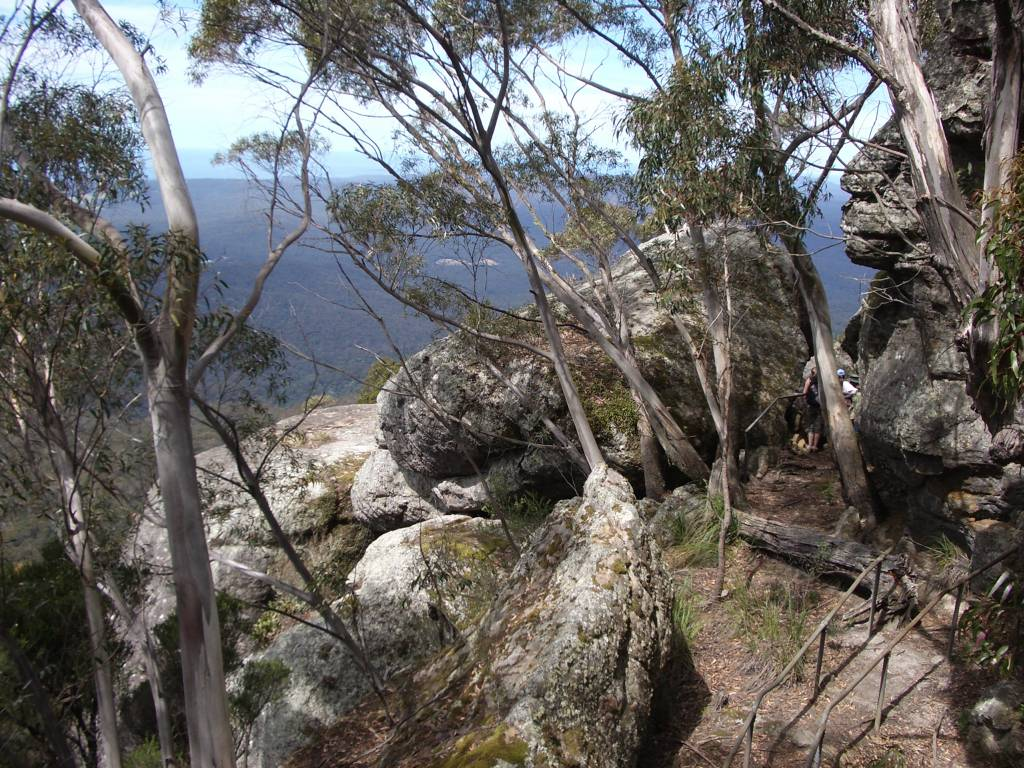
On the summit of Dithol or Pigeon House Mountain in nearby Morton National Park.

== See also ==
- Protected areas of New South Wales
