= Budawang Range =

Mountain range in Australia

- Budawangs
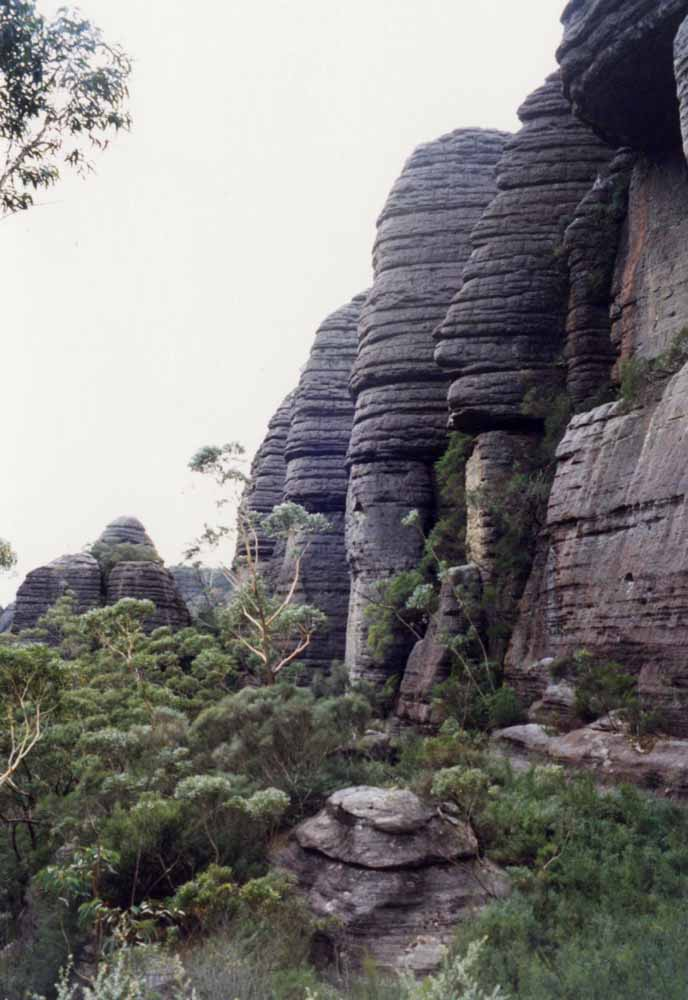
- The Seven Gods Monoliths

Highest point
- Peak: Mount Budawang
- Elevation: 1,129 m (3,704 ft); AHD
- Coordinates: 37°29′S 150°00′E

Dimensions
- Length: 53 km (33 mi) SSW / NNE

Geography
- Location within New South Wales
- Country: Australia
- State: New South Wales
- Region: South Coast
- Range coordinates: 35°17′S 150°10′E
- Parent range: Great Dividing Range

The Budawang Range, commonly called The Budawangs, a rugged mountain range within the Budawang National Park and the Morton National Park, are part of a spur off the Great Dividing Range and are located in the South Coast region of New South Wales, Australia.

The highest mountain in the range is Mount Budawang, which has an elevation of 1,129 metres (3,704 ft) above sea level.

== Location and features ==
Commencing between the headwaters of the Clyde and Endrick Rivers, The Budawangs extend in a generally south southwest direction for about 53 kilometres (33 mi) to Mount Budawang about 8 kilometres (5.0 mi) southeast of Mongarlowe. The range consists of mountains and escarpments, generally at an elevation of 334 metres (1,096 ft) AHD, forming most of the western watershed of the Clyde River. The range comprises a series of hills extending generally west northwest from the north end of Budawang Range near Sassafras for about 21 kilometres (13 mi) to above the junction of the Shoalhaven and Endrick rivers. The Pigeon House Range forms the watershed between the northeast waters of Endrick River and those flowing north into the Shoalhaven River. A prominent range bearing west northwest forms the watershed separating the Endrick and Shoalhaven River systems. The Budawang Range is located approximately 190 kilometres (120 mi) south-southwest of Sydney.

The range defines part of the boundary between the New South Wales South Coast and the Southern Tablelands.

Much of the land within the range has been declared a wilderness area and are popular with bush walkers due to their terrain and unique features.

=== Mountain peaks ===
The Budawangs are generally considered to contain peaks located with the Budawang Range, the Pigeon House Range, the Currockbilly Range, and the Wirritin Range. The major recorded peaks are:

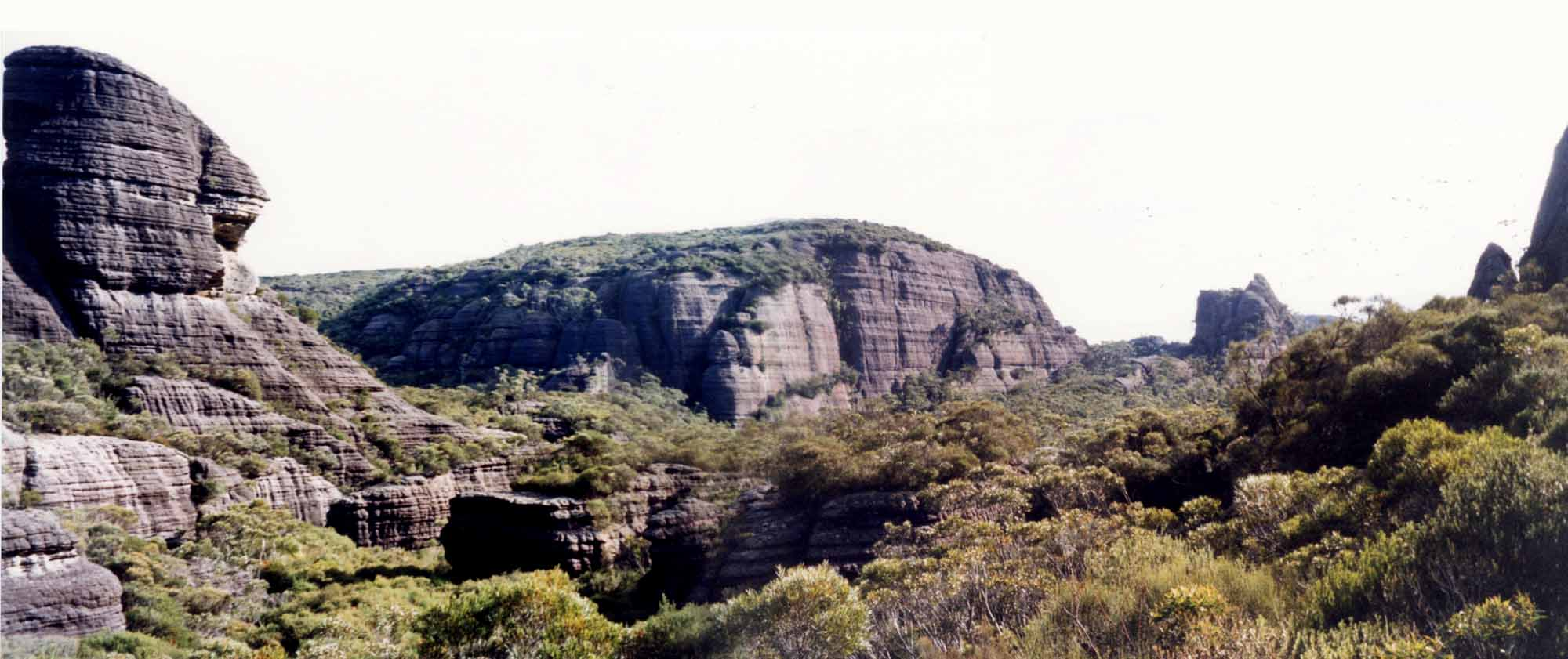
Monolith Valley

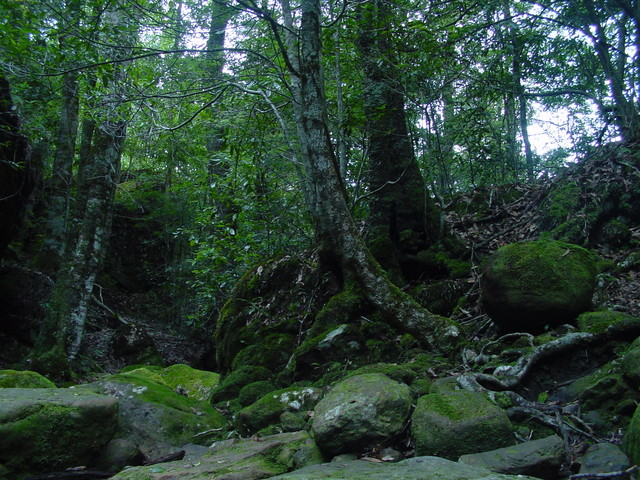
Budawangs subtropical rain forest

- Mount Budawang (1,129 m or 3,704 ft)
- Currockbilly Mountain (1,087 m or 3,566 ft)
- Mount Tarn (876 m or 2,844 ft)
- Wog Wog Mountain (893 m or 2,930 ft)
- Mount Cole (876 m or 2,874 ft)
- Sturgiss Mountain (858 m or 2,815 ft)
- Fosters Mountain (857 m or 2,812 ft)
- Barneys Hill (855 m or 2,805 ft)
- The Castle (831 m or 2,726 ft)
- Shrouded Gods Mountain (809 m or 2,654 ft)
- Donjon Mountain (786 m or 2,579 ft)
- Quiltys Mountain (775 m or 2,543 ft)
- Wirritin Mountain (674 m or 2,211 ft)
- Pigeon House Mountain / Didthul (665 m or 2,182 ft)
- Mount Bushwalker (640 m or 2,100 ft)
- Byangee Mountain (500 m or 1,640 ft)

=== Other features ===
Other features within the range include the Monolith Valley, The Seven Gods Monoliths, Clyde River Valley, Hidden Valley, and Ettrema Gorge.

== Land use history ==
=== Aboriginal use ===
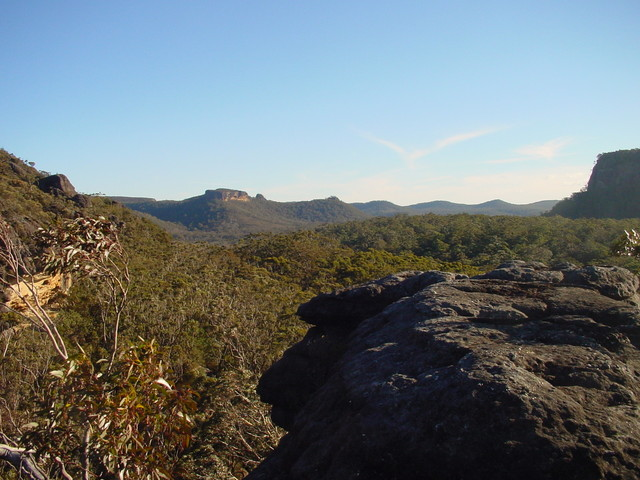
View across the Budawangs from Hidden Valley

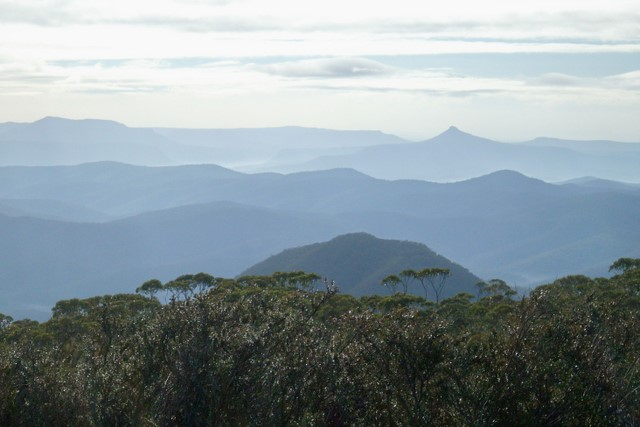
View from Mount Budawang towards Pigeon House Mountain

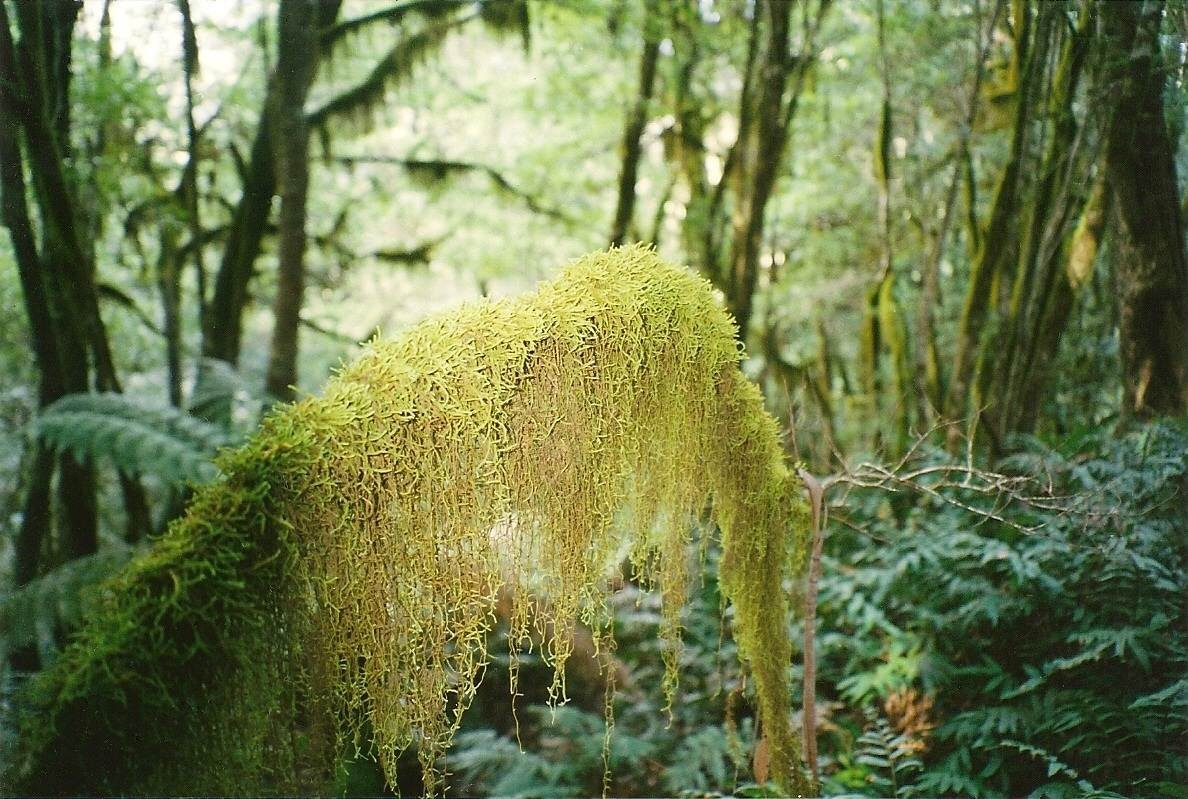
Moss at the rainforest at Mount Budawang

The earliest human occupants of The Budawangs were three Aboriginal tribes; the Budawang people who live between Conjola and Duras, the Wandandians who inhabit land to the north of Pigeon House Mountain (Balgan), and the Walbanjas who live south of Pigeon House.

There are archaeological records of Aboriginal presence in the area dating back to around 11,000 years ago. Nearby coastal deposits have been dated at around 20,000 years old, so occupation in the Budawangs may well be older than current evidence suggests. Archaeological evidence found in the area includes occupational deposits in rock shelters, open campsites, and axe grinding grooves often found on rocks by the sides of creeks in the area. Art sites and rock arrangements also exist in the Budawangs though they are quite rare - the best of these is on Quilty's Mountain.

=== European land use ===
There are several grazing farmlands surrounding the national parks region both in the east and the west of the range. Logging began in the Budawang area in the early 1900s, it continues to this day in areas that remain outside of the national parks, such as state forests.

The Australian Army operated an artillery range on the Tianjara plateau between 1943 and 1974, also using the area for practice bombing and exercises often involving offroad vehicles. This area is highly damaged and littered with target debris and unexploded ordnance. If walking in or near this area, walker should take extreme care.

Royal Australian Navy jet aircraft and helicopters use the area as a designated low-fly training area, allowing high speed flight through the area at 50 feet (15 m) above the ground.

== Access ==
As The Budawangs are only accessible from gravel roads, care should be taken after rain as the roads can become slippery.

The northern parts of the area including the Clyde River valley are best accessed from the Braidwood Nowra road. There are two entrances in the northern part of the park. One is near Nerriga and requires walking through farmland to the area around Quilty's Mountain. The other main northern entrance is a not very clearly marked gate on the side of the road near Sassafras.

Access to The Castle and Monolith Valley is best achieved from Long Gully just off the Western Distributor.

Access to the western Wog Wog Mountain side of the park is via a park entrance off the Mongarlowe/Nerriga road, either coming from Braidwood to the south or Nowra to the north.

All three main entrances now have marked campsites and pit toilets. The Sassafrass campsite is approximately 600 metres (2,000 ft) down the fire trail from the carpark and has tank water and a sheltered picnic table. The Wog Wog campsite has no water. The Long Gully campsite is located adjacent to the Yadboro River.

=== Maps ===
If walking in The Budawangs a recommended resource is the Northern Budawang Range and the Upper Clyde River Valley sketch map, published by The Budawang Committee and available in most Sydney/Nowra/Canberra bushwalking stores. The sketch map was hand drawn and details many of the possible walks in the most popular part of the national park. The area is also covered by the 1:25,000 CMA maps CORANG (8927-3-N), ENDRICK (8927-4-S), TIANJARA (8927-1-S) and MILTON (8927-2-N).

== See also ==
- List of mountains in Australia § New South Wales
- Protected areas of New South Wales
