= Electoral results for the district of Bega =

Election results for Bega, New South Wales, Australia

Bega, an electoral district of the Legislative Assembly in the Australian state of New South Wales, has had two incarnations, the first from 1894 to 1920, the second from 1988 to the present.

| Election | Member | Party |
|---|---|---|
| 1894 | Thomas Rawlinson | Ind. Protectionist |
| 1895 | Henry Clarke | Ind. Protectionist |
| 1898 | Henry Clarke | Protectionist |
| 1901 | Henry Clarke | Progressive |
| 1904 | William Wood | Liberal Reform |
| 1907 | William Wood | Liberal Reform |
| 1910 | William Wood | Liberal Reform |
| 1913 | William Millard | Liberal Reform |
| 1917 | William Millard | Nationalist |
| Election | Member | Party |
| 1988 | Russell Smith | Liberal |
| 1991 | Russell Smith | Liberal |
| 1995 | Russell Smith | Liberal |
| 1999 | Russell Smith | Liberal |
| 2003 | Andrew Constance | Liberal |
| 2007 | Andrew Constance | Liberal |
| 2011 | Andrew Constance | Liberal |
| 2015 | Andrew Constance | Liberal |
| 2019 | Andrew Constance | Liberal |
| 2022 by | Michael Holland | Labor |
| 2023 | Michael Holland | Labor |

== Election results ==
=== Elections in the 2020s ===
==== 2023 ====
2023 New South Wales state election: Bega
| Party | Candidate | Votes | % | ±% |
|---|---|---|---|---|
| Labor | Michael Holland | 23,294 | 45.07 | +14.48 |
| Liberal | Russell Fitzpatrick | 16,268 | 31.48 | −17.43 |
| Greens | Cathy Griff | 4,322 | 8.36 | −1.39 |
| Shooters, Fishers, Farmers | Debra Abbott | 3,802 | 7.36 | +0.90 |
| Legalise Cannabis | Greg White | 2,043 | 3.95 | +3.95 |
| Independent | Jeffrey Hawkins | 1,199 | 2.32 | +2.32 |
| Sustainable Australia | Karin Geiselhart | 756 | 1.46 | +1.46 |
| Total formal votes | | 51,684 | 97.19 | +0.01 |
| Informal votes | | 1,495 | 2.81 | −0.01 |
| Turnout | | 53,179 | 88.99 | −0.76 |
Two-party-preferred result
| Labor | Michael Holland | 27,835 | 60.40 | +17.33 |
| Liberal | Russell Fitzpatrick | 18,248 | 39.60 | −17.33 |
| Labor gain from Liberal | | Swing | +17.33 | |

Andrew Constance (Liberal) had won the seat at the 2019 state election, however he resigned in 2021 and Michael Holland (Labor) won the seat at the resulting by-election. At the 2023 state election, Holland retained the seat he won at the by-election.

==== 2022 by-election ====
2022 Bega state by-election
| Party | Candidate | Votes | % | ±% |
|---|---|---|---|---|
| Labor | Michael Holland | 21,361 | 43.16 | +12.57 |
| Liberal | Fiona Kotvojs | 19,165 | 38.72 | −10.18 |
| Greens | Peter Haggar | 3,453 | 6.98 | –2.78 |
| Shooters, Fishers, Farmers | Victor Hazir | 2,312 | 4.67 | −1.79 |
| Independent | Jeffrey Hawkins | 1,379 | 2.79 | +2.79 |
| Sustainable Australia | Karin Geiselhart | 1,011 | 2.04 | +2.04 |
| Independent | Ursula Bennett | 811 | 1.64 | +1.64 |
| Total formal votes | | 49,492 | 98.25 | +1.07 |
| Informal votes | | 884 | 1.75 | −1.07 |
| Turnout | | 50,376 | 85.70 | −4.06 |
Two-party-preferred result
| Labor | Michael Holland | 24,837 | 55.06 | +11.99 |
| Liberal | Fiona Kotvojs | 20,269 | 44.94 | −11.99 |
| Labor gain from Liberal | | Swing | +11.99 | |

=== Elections in the 2010s ===
==== 2019 ====
2019 New South Wales state election: Bega
| Party | Candidate | Votes | % | ±% |
|---|---|---|---|---|
| Liberal | Andrew Constance | 24,796 | 48.91 | −4.33 |
| Labor | Leanne Atkinson | 15,508 | 30.59 | −2.25 |
| Greens | William Douglas | 4,945 | 9.75 | −0.35 |
| Shooters, Fishers, Farmers | Eric Thomas | 3,275 | 6.46 | +6.46 |
| Animal Justice | Coral Anderson | 1,371 | 2.70 | +2.70 |
| Conservatives | Joshua Shoobridge | 806 | 1.59 | +1.59 |
| Total formal votes | | 50,701 | 97.18 | +0.09 |
| Informal votes | | 1,472 | 2.82 | −0.09 |
| Turnout | | 52,173 | 89.75 | −0.32 |
Two-party-preferred result
| Liberal | Andrew Constance | 26,210 | 56.93 | −1.26 |
| Labor | Leanne Atkinson | 19,830 | 43.07 | +1.26 |
| Liberal hold | | Swing | −1.26 | |

==== 2015 ====
2015 New South Wales state election: Bega
| Party | Candidate | Votes | % | ±% |
|---|---|---|---|---|
| Liberal | Andrew Constance | 25,379 | 53.2 | −5.1 |
| Labor | Leanne Atkinson | 15,652 | 32.8 | +10.7 |
| Greens | Margaret Perger | 4,817 | 10.1 | −2.0 |
| No Land Tax | Clyde Archard | 1,138 | 2.4 | +2.4 |
| Christian Democrats | Ursula Bennett | 683 | 1.4 | −0.2 |
| Total formal votes | | 47,669 | 97.1 | +0.8 |
| Informal votes | | 1,427 | 2.9 | −0.8 |
| Turnout | | 49,096 | 90.1 | +0.3 |
Two-party-preferred result
| Liberal | Andrew Constance | 26,023 | 58.2 | −10.3 |
| Labor | Leanne Atkinson | 18,696 | 41.8 | +10.3 |
| Liberal hold | | Swing | −10.3 | |

==== 2011 ====
2011 New South Wales state election: Bega
| Party | Candidate | Votes | % | ±% |
|---|---|---|---|---|
| Liberal | Andrew Constance | 26,122 | 59.0 | +12.1 |
| Labor | Leanne Atkinson | 9,749 | 22.0 | −12.9 |
| Greens | Harriett Swift | 5,358 | 12.1 | +4.6 |
| Independent | Ivan McKay | 2,341 | 5.3 | +5.3 |
| Christian Democrats | Ursula Bennett | 716 | 1.6 | +0.0 |
| Total formal votes | | 44,286 | 96.9 | −1.0 |
| Informal votes | | 1,426 | 3.1 | +1.0 |
| Turnout | | 45,712 | 92.0 | −0.5 |
Two-party-preferred result
| Liberal | Andrew Constance | 27,369 | 68.6 | +13.6 |
| Labor | Leanne Atkinson | 12,505 | 31.4 | −13.6 |
| Liberal hold | | Swing | +13.6 | |

=== Elections in the 2000s ===
==== 2007 ====
2007 New South Wales state election: Bega
| Party | Candidate | Votes | % | ±% |
|---|---|---|---|---|
| Liberal | Andrew Constance | 20,196 | 46.9 | +10.8 |
| Labor | Wilma Chinnock | 15,053 | 34.9 | +4.5 |
| Greens | Margaret Perger | 3,248 | 7.5 | −2.6 |
| Independent | David Hede | 3,071 | 7.1 | +7.1 |
| AAFI | Philip Hodge | 799 | 1.9 | +1.9 |
| Christian Democrats | Wess Buckley | 714 | 1.7 | +0.4 |
| Total formal votes | | 43,081 | 97.8 | +0.2 |
| Informal votes | | 949 | 2.2 | −0.2 |
| Turnout | | 44,030 | 92.5 | |
Two-party-preferred result
| Liberal | Andrew Constance | 21,778 | 55.1 | +0.4 |
| Labor | Wilma Chinnock | 17,771 | 44.9 | −0.4 |
| Liberal hold | | Swing | +0.4 | |

==== 2003 ====
2003 New South Wales state election: Bega
| Party | Candidate | Votes | % | ±% |
|---|---|---|---|---|
| Liberal | Andrew Constance | 17,151 | 39.3 | −6.4 |
| Labor | Wilma Chinnock | 13,595 | 31.2 | −0.3 |
| Independent | Chris Vardon | 7,094 | 16.3 | +16.3 |
| Greens | Annie Florence | 4,349 | 10.0 | +6.7 |
| One Nation | Lynn Abraham | 775 | 1.8 | −11.2 |
| Christian Democrats | Ursula Bennett | 640 | 1.5 | +1.5 |
| Total formal votes | | 43,604 | 97.6 | −0.7 |
| Informal votes | | 1,068 | 2.4 | +0.7 |
| Turnout | | 44,672 | 92.7 | |
Two-party-preferred result
| Liberal | Andrew Constance | 19,417 | 53.9 | −3.3 |
| Labor | Wilma Chinnock | 16,634 | 46.1 | +3.3 |
| Liberal hold | | Swing | −3.3 | |

=== Elections in the 1990s ===
==== 1999 ====
1999 New South Wales state election: Bega
| Party | Candidate | Votes | % | ±% |
|---|---|---|---|---|
| Liberal | Russell Smith | 18,253 | 45.7 | −12.8 |
| Labor | John Boland | 12,562 | 31.5 | +3.4 |
| One Nation | Robin Innes | 5,200 | 13.0 | +13.0 |
| Democrats | Denise Redmond | 1,751 | 4.4 | +0.4 |
| Greens | Kathy Freihaut | 1,465 | 3.7 | −3.1 |
| Independent | Robert Paris | 685 | 1.7 | +1.7 |
| Total formal votes | | 39,916 | 98.3 | +2.0 |
| Informal votes | | 678 | 1.7 | −2.0 |
| Turnout | | 40,594 | 93.4 | |
Two-party-preferred result
| Liberal | Russell Smith | 20,251 | 57.1 | −6.4 |
| Labor | John Boland | 15,186 | 42.9 | +6.4 |
| Liberal hold | | Swing | −6.4 | |

==== 1995 ====
1995 New South Wales state election: Bega
| Party | Candidate | Votes | % | ±% |
|---|---|---|---|---|
| Liberal | Russell Smith | 21,653 | 58.7 | 0.0 |
| Labor | John Boland | 10,307 | 27.9 | −2.3 |
| Greens | Mark Blecher | 2,529 | 6.9 | +6.9 |
| Democrats | Denise Redmond | 1,484 | 4.0 | −7.1 |
| Call to Australia | David Howes | 724 | 2.0 | +2.0 |
| Natural Law | Peter Fraser | 209 | 0.6 | +0.6 |
| Total formal votes | | 36,906 | 96.4 | +4.4 |
| Informal votes | | 1,397 | 3.6 | −4.4 |
| Turnout | | 38,303 | 93.3 | |
Two-party-preferred result
| Liberal | Russell Smith | 22,769 | 63.7 | +0.9 |
| Labor | John Boland | 12,981 | 36.3 | −0.9 |
| Liberal hold | | Swing | +0.9 | |

==== 1991 ====
1991 New South Wales state election: Bega
| Party | Candidate | Votes | % | ±% |
|---|---|---|---|---|
| Liberal | Russell Smith | 17,925 | 58.7 | +22.5 |
| Labor | Ian Marshall | 9,232 | 30.2 | +9.0 |
| Democrats | Denise Redmond | 3,402 | 11.1 | +10.0 |
| Total formal votes | | 30,559 | 92.0 | −5.8 |
| Informal votes | | 2,671 | 8.0 | +5.8 |
| Turnout | | 33,230 | 92.3 | |
Two-party-preferred result
| Liberal | Russell Smith | 18,669 | 62.8 | −2.4 |
| Labor | Ian Marshall | 11,082 | 37.2 | +2.4 |
| Liberal hold | | Swing | −2.4 | |

=== Elections in the 1980s ===
==== 1988 ====
1988 New South Wales state election: Bega
| Party | Candidate | Votes | % | ±% |
|---|---|---|---|---|
| Liberal | Russell Smith | 12,380 | 39.4 | +7.2 |
| National | Ronald Ferguson | 6,881 | 21.9 | +14.3 |
| Labor | Robert Ware | 6,563 | 20.9 | −15.5 |
| Independent | Richard Roberts | 5,235 | 16.6 | +16.6 |
| Democrats | John Nicholson | 389 | 1.2 | +1.2 |
| Total formal votes | | 31,448 | 98.0 | −0.6 |
| Informal votes | | 637 | 2.0 | +0.6 |
| Turnout | | 32,085 | 92.4 | |
Two-party-preferred result
| Liberal | Russell Smith | 20,448 | 68.7 | +16.0 |
| Labor | Robert Ware | 9,331 | 31.3 | −16.0 |
| Liberal notional hold | | Swing | +16.0 | |

==== 1920 - 1988 ====
District abolished

=== Elections in the 1910s ===
==== 1917 ====
1917 New South Wales state election: Bega
| Party | Candidate | Votes | % | ±% |
|---|---|---|---|---|
| Nationalist | William Millard | 3,452 | 58.4 | +17.8 |
| Labor | John Webster | 2,459 | 41.6 | +9.0 |
| Total formal votes | | 5,911 | 99.1 | +0.6 |
| Informal votes | | 52 | 0.9 | −0.6 |
| Turnout | | 5,963 | 63.0 | −13.2 |
| Nationalist hold | | Swing | +6.2 | |

==== 1913 ====
1913 New South Wales state election: Bega
| Party | Candidate | Votes | % | ±% |
|---|---|---|---|---|
| Liberal Reform | William Millard | 2,966 | 40.6 | |
| Labor | John Webster | 2,386 | 32.6 | |
| Independent | Hector McWilliam | 1,571 | 21.5 | |
| Independent | Frederick Bland | 388 | 5.3 | |
| Total formal votes | | 7,311 | 98.5 | |
| Informal votes | | 109 | 1.5 | |
| Turnout | | 7,420 | 76.2 | |
Second round result
| Liberal Reform | William Millard | 3,810 | 52.2 | |
| Labor | John Webster | 3,484 | 47.8 | |
| Total formal votes | | 7,294 | 99.4 | |
| Informal votes | | 46 | 0.6 | |
| Turnout | | 7,340 | 75.4 | |
| Liberal Reform hold | | | | |

==== 1910 ====
1910 New South Wales state election: Bega
| Party | Candidate | Votes | % | ±% |
|---|---|---|---|---|
| Liberal Reform | William Wood | 3,449 | 56.8 | |
| Labour | Francis Riley | 2,626 | 43.2 | |
| Total formal votes | | 6,075 | 99.0 | |
| Informal votes | | 61 | 1.0 | |
| Turnout | | 6,136 | 77.6 | |
| Liberal Reform hold | | | | |

=== Elections in the 1900s ===
==== 1907 ====
1907 New South Wales state election: Bega
| Party | Candidate | Votes | % | ±% |
|---|---|---|---|---|
| Liberal Reform | William Wood | 3,024 | 55.5 | |
| Labour | George Holt | 2,423 | 44.5 | |
| Total formal votes | | 5,447 | 98.7 | |
| Informal votes | | 74 | 1.3 | |
| Turnout | | 5,521 | 74.8 | |
| Liberal Reform hold | | | | |

==== 1904 ====
1904 New South Wales state election: Bega
| Party | Candidate | Votes | % | ±% |
|---|---|---|---|---|
| Liberal Reform | William Wood | 1,904 | 36.9 | |
| Progressive | Henry Clarke | 1,063 | 20.6 | |
| Labour | Bernard McTernan | 1,062 | 20.6 | |
| Independent | Frederick Bland | 775 | 15.0 | |
| Independent | Edmund Coman | 351 | 6.8 | |
| Total formal votes | | 5,155 | 99.3 | |
| Informal votes | | 36 | 0.7 | |
| Turnout | | 5,191 | 72.1 | |
| Liberal Reform gain from Progressive | | | | |

Bega was expanded to include part of the abolished district of Eden-Bombala. Henry Clarke (Progressive) was the member for Bega while William Wood (Liberal Reform) was the member for Eden-Bombala.

==== 1901 ====
1901 New South Wales state election: Bega
| Party | Candidate | Votes | % | ±% |
|---|---|---|---|---|
| Progressive | Henry Clarke | 925 | 54.8 | −2.4 |
| Independent | William Boot | 717 | 42.5 | +0.3 |
| Independent | William Braine | 45 | 2.7 | +2.1 |
| Total formal votes | | 1,687 | 99.1 | +0.5 |
| Informal votes | | 16 | 0.9 | −0.5 |
| Turnout | | 1,703 | 73.8 | +11.9 |
| Progressive hold | | | | |

=== Elections in the 1890s ===
==== 1898 ====
1898 New South Wales colonial election: Bega
| Party | Candidate | Votes | % | ±% |
|---|---|---|---|---|
| National Federal | Henry Clarke | 753 | 57.2 | |
| Independent Federalist | William Boot | 555 | 42.2 | |
| Independent Federalist | William Braine | 8 | 0.6 | |
| Total formal votes | | 1,316 | 98.7 | |
| Informal votes | | 18 | 1.4 | |
| Turnout | | 1,334 | 61.9 | |
| Member changed to National Federal from Ind. Protectionist | | | | |

==== 1895 ====
1895 New South Wales colonial election: Bega
| Party | Candidate | Votes | % | ±% |
|---|---|---|---|---|
| Ind. Protectionist | Henry Clarke | 880 | 62.1 | |
| Protectionist | Thomas Rawlinson | 537 | 37.9 | |
| Total formal votes | | 1,417 | 98.8 | |
| Informal votes | | 17 | 1.2 | |
| Turnout | | 1,434 | 71.4 | |
| Ind. Protectionist gain from Protectionist | | | | |

==== 1894 ====
1894 New South Wales colonial election: Bega
| Party | Candidate | Votes | % | ±% |
|---|---|---|---|---|
| Ind. Protectionist | Thomas Rawlinson | 717 | 41.3 | |
| Protectionist | James Garvan | 616 | 35.5 | |
| Free Trade | William Neilley | 349 | 20.1 | |
| Ind. Free Trade | Peter Wood | 55 | 3.2 | |
| Total formal votes | | 1,737 | 98.5 | |
| Informal votes | | 27 | 1.5 | |
| Turnout | | 1,764 | 86.9 | |
| Ind. Protectionist win | | (new seat) | | |
