= Sunshine Bay, New South Wales =

Sunshine Bay
- Town
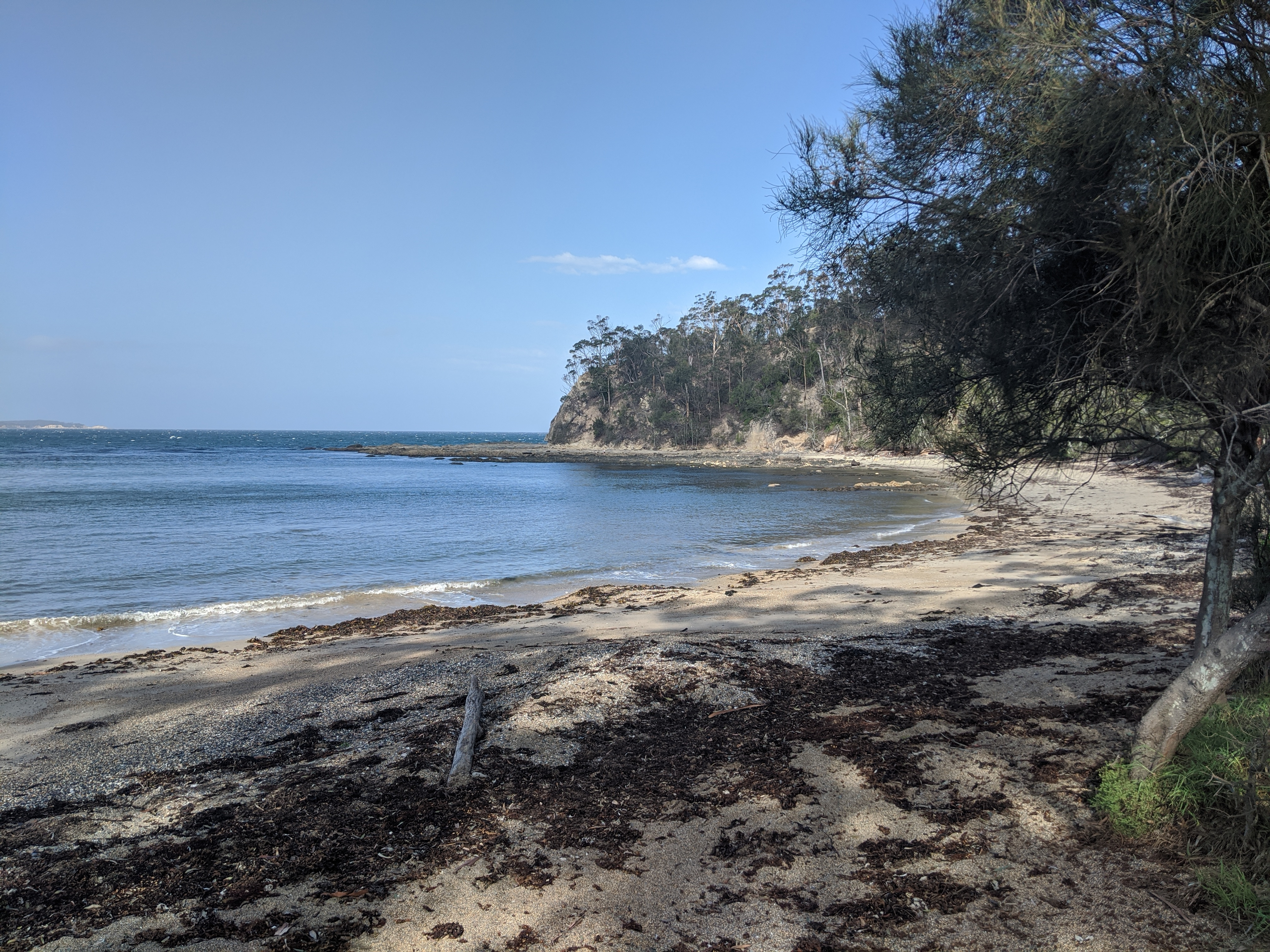
- Sunshine Bay

- Coordinates: 35°44′42″S 150°12′28″E
- Country: Australia
- State: New South Wales
- Region: South Coast
- LGA: Eurobodalla Shire
- Location: 6 km (3.7 mi) SE of Batemans Bay; 285 km (177 mi) S of Sydney; 155 km (96 mi) SE of Canberra

Government
  - State electorate: Bega
  - Federal division: Gilmore

Population
  - Total: 1,439 (SAL 2021)
- Postcode: 2536
- County: St Vincent
- Parish: Bateman
Localities around Sunshine Bay
| Batehaven |
| Batehaven | Sunshine Bay | Tasman Sea |
| Surf Beach | Denhams Beach |

Sunshine Bay is a suburb of Batemans Bay in Eurobodalla Shire, New South Wales, Australia. It lies on the Tasman Sea coast, about 6 km southeast of Batemans Bay and 285 km south of Sydney. At the 2016 census, it had a population of 1,221.

Sunshine Bay Public School was established in 1985.
