= North Batemans Bay =

- Town
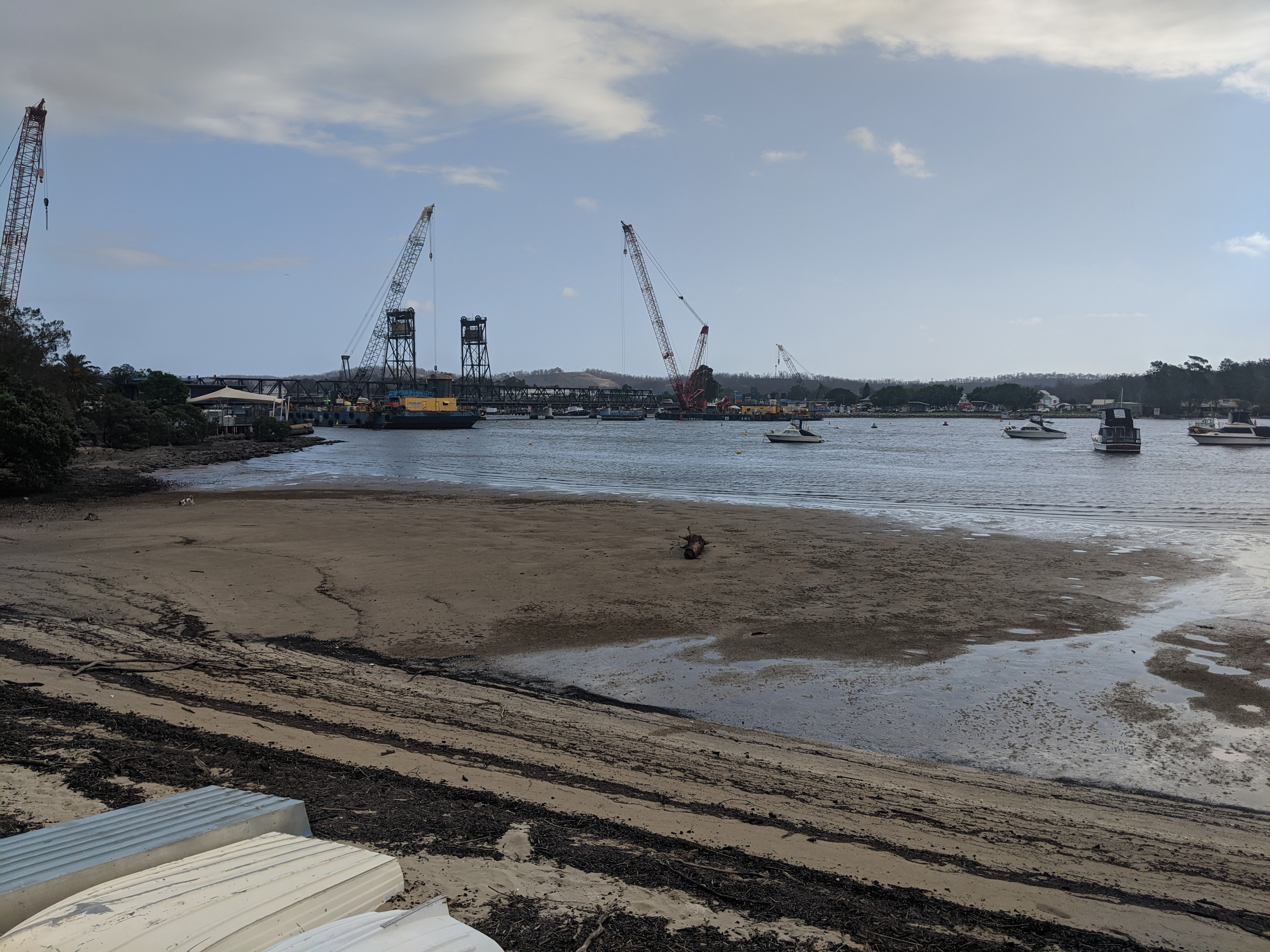
- New bridge over the Clyde under construction from North Batemans Bay

- Coordinates: 35°41′14″S 150°11′17″E
- Country: Australia
- State: New South Wales
- Region: South Coast
- LGA: Eurobodalla Shire
- Location: 5 km (3.1 mi) N of Batemans Bay; 275 km (171 mi) S of Sydney; 150 km (93 mi) SE of Canberra

Government
  - State electorate: Bega
  - Federal division: Gilmore

Population
  - Total: 794 (2021 census)
- Postcode: 2536
- County: St Vincent
- Parish: East Nelligen
Localities around North Batemans Bay
Nelligen	Benandarah	Long Beach
Batemans Bay	North Batemans Bay	Surfside
Batemans Bay	Batemans Bay	Clyde River

North Batemans Bay is a suburb of Batemans Bay in Eurobodalla Shire, New South Wales, Australia. It lies on the north bank of the Clyde estuary, north of Batemans Bay and 285 km south of Sydney. At the 2021 census, it had a population of 794.
