= Currowan =

- Town
- Interactive map of Currowan
- Coordinates: 35°34′11.7″S 150°03′31.1″E
- Country: Australia
- State: New South Wales
- Region: South Coast
- LGA: Eurobodalla Shire
- Location: 42 km (26 mi) SE of Braidwood; 30 km (19 mi) N of Batemans Bay; 48 km (30 mi) SW of Ulladulla; 339 km (211 mi) SSW of Sydney

Government
  - State electorate: Bega
  - Federal division: Eden-Monaro
- Elevation: 104 m (341 ft)

Population
  - Total: 72 (SAL 2021)
- Postcode: 2536
- County: St Vincent
- Parish: Currowan
Localities around Currowan
Budawang Range	Bimberamala National Park	Shallow Crossing
Monga	Currowan	Clyde River
Monga National Park	Nelligen	Batemans Bay

Currowan is a locality in the Eurobodalla Shire, on the South Coast of New South Wales, Australia. At the 2016 census, it had a population of 53. There was once a settlement, now a ghost town, of the same name.

== Location ==
Currowan is about 42 km south-east of Braidwood.

The locality can be considered as having three distinct parts. The western part of the locality, near where the Kings Highway runs close to Currowan Creek below Clyde Mountain, the largely forested and hilly central area, and the eastern part adjacent to the right bank of the Clyde River. Currowan Creek links the three parts of the locality.

== History ==
=== Aboriginal history ===
Currowan lies on the traditional lands of Walbanga people, a group of Yuin.

=== Settlement and 'town' of Currowan ===
There was a planned village or township of the same name. Its site was on the right bank of the Clyde River estuary and the right bank of Currowan Creek, where the two waterways converge. This site of the village of Currowan was fixed in 1844 and a village plan laid out, in that same year, by then colonial surveyor and later ill-fated explorer, Edmund Kennedy. The village site had been reserved by another colonial surveyor, James Larmer, in 1841. The site was remote and, at the time, only accessible by water. As a result of the Crown Lands Act of 1884, Currowan was proclaimed a town on 20 March 1885.

After completion of the Clyde Road in 1858, town allotments were put on sale in 1859, in both Nelligen and Currowan. Closer to the river mouth, it was Nelligen that was chosen to become the terminus of the new road connection to the Southern Tablelands and the port town on the Clyde. Although the Clyde follows a meandering course upstream of Nelligen, it was navigable to Currowan and the town had a stone wharf, plenty of flat land and a good water supply. However, the town of Currowan never prospered.

The absence of a road connection from the Braidwood district to Currowan remained an obstacle to its growth as a port, and the floods of 1860 showed that the town's site was flood-prone. Even so, Currowan remained a minor landing place that allowed easier access than Nelligen to gold mines in the district. By 1859, there was a better road connecting Currowan to Nelligen and gold had been mined in the hills within four or five miles of Currowan. The most significant period of quartz reef mining activity in the area seems to have begun in earnest around 1890. It was relatively short lived and on a small scale. The last mine to close, in 1915, was the Phoenix Mine, which was probably also the largest of the mines close to Currowan village.

The town held a race meeting in 1901. However, a visitor in the same year mentions seeing only the school, some farms and a sawmill. It seems the 'town', by then, was only the very smallest of settlements.

Land was reserved in the town for a Public School in 1893. Currowan had a 'provisional school' (Oct 1882 to May 1884), later a public school (May 1884 to May 1888) and finally a 'half-time school' (May 1888 to May 1907, and May 1910 to May 1916). There was also a separate school in the western part of the locality at Currowan Creek. It was a 'house-to-house school' from November 1883 until December 1891. Later, it was a 'half-time school', called Clyde Mountain, from January 1892 until it closed in December 1893.

In 1920, a factory was established, by the Austral Starch Company Limited, to extract starch from the burrawong plant (Macrozamia communis). The factory was near the mouth of Currowan Creek. A tramway running, along Mimosa Street, linked the factory to the town's wharf. The venture was unsuccessful and had closed by April 1923. There were two small gold mines west of the Currowan village operating from around 1934 to 1935.

Currowan became a locality, under the Geographical Names Act of 1966. Little remains of the 'town' of Currowan today. Some of its street names and town allotments still appear on modern-day maps. The old town site is accessible via the River Road from Nelligen.

=== Currowan Creek Aboriginal Reserve ===
On the opposite bank of Currowan Creek to the town site, "about 60 acres" of land was set aside, in April 1893, as an Aboriginal reserve. This became the Currowan Creek Aboriginal Reserve, which lasted until 1956. It was recorded as 50 acres in size.

In June 1910, there were just three huts, with two adults and five children—three of school age—living there. The people living there had employment, at times, cutting sleepers and stripping wattle bark (for tanning), and three acres of land were under cultivation for maize and vegetables.

=== Currowan bushfire ===
The locality gave its name to one of the disastrous bushfires of the 2019-2020 Australian summer, the Currowan fire. It broke out at Currowan on 26 November 2019 and, over 74 days and after merging with other fires—some of which were caused by the main fire spreading beyond erstwhile containment lines—it burnt 499,621 hectares (1,234,590 acres), destroyed 312 homes, and damaged another 173. It took three human lives and also killed countless wild animals, birds, reptiles, amphibians and invertebrates. It has been observed that the Currowan fire was only really contained by reaching the coastline, which it did at multiple locations. The final extinguishing of the fire came only with torrential rain, on 8 February 2020.
