= Surfside, New South Wales =

Surfside
- Town
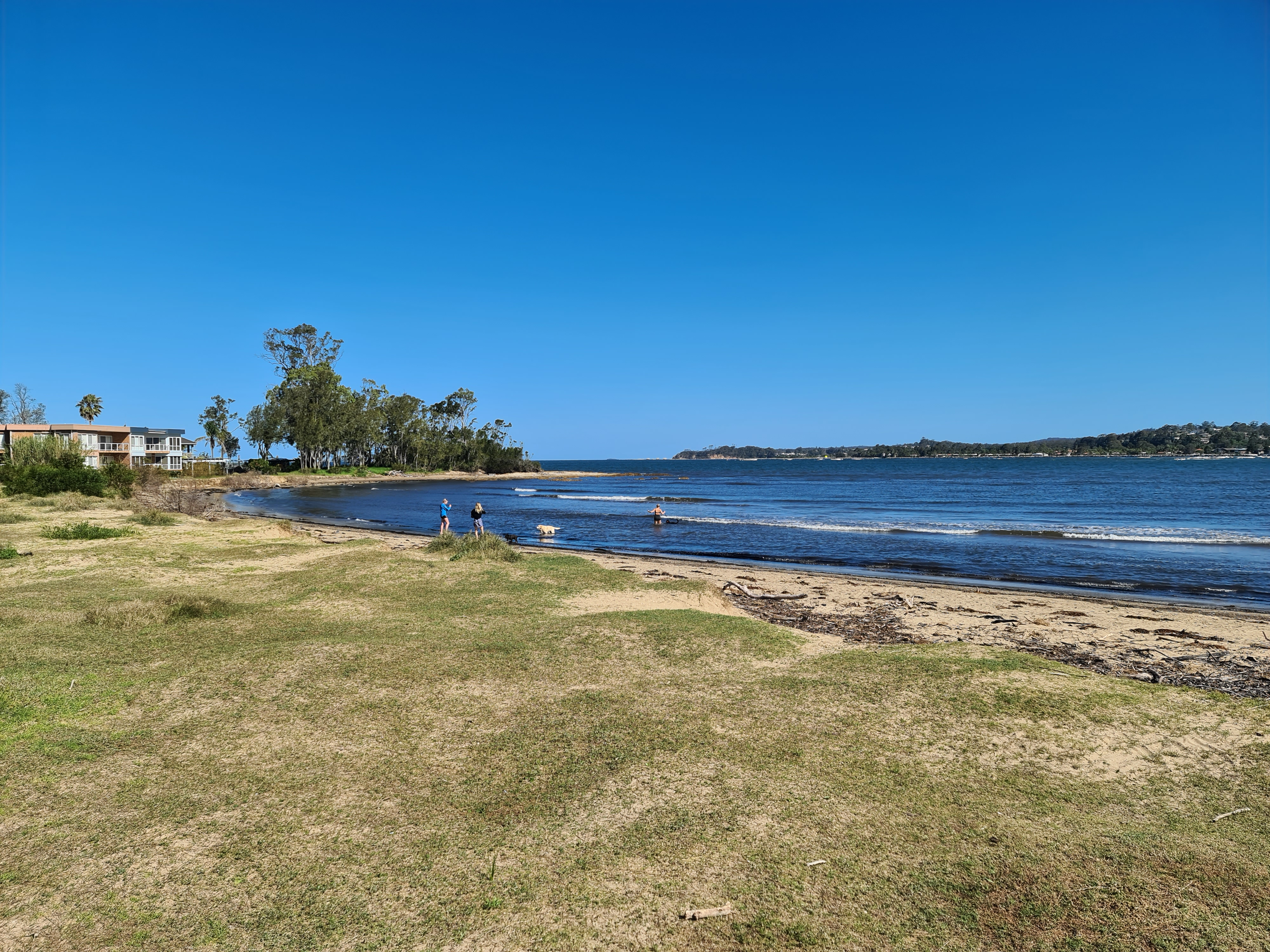

- Coordinates: 35°41′42″S 150°11′59″E
- Country: Australia
- State: New South Wales
- Region: South Coast
- LGA: Eurobodalla Shire
- Location: 5 km (3.1 mi) NE of Batemans Bay; 274 km (170 mi) S of Sydney; 148 km (92 mi) SE of Canberra

Government
  - State electorate: Bega
  - Federal division: Gilmore

Population
  - Total: 1,371 (2016 census)
- Postcode: 2536
- County: St Vincent
- Parish: East Nelligen
Localities around Surfside
North Batemans Bay	North Batemans Bay	Long Beach
North Batemans Bay	Surfside	Long Beach
Batemans Bay	Clyde estuary	Long Beach

Surfside is a suburb of Batemans Bay in Eurobodalla Shire, New South Wales, Australia. It lies on the north bank of the Clyde estuary, north of Batemans Bay and 274 km south of Sydney. At the 2016 census, it had a population of 1,371.
