= Malua Bay, New South Wales =

Malua Bay
- Town
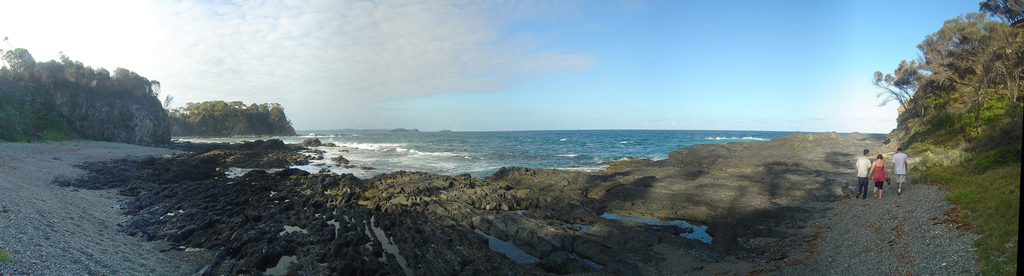
- Panorama taken at Malua Bay.

- Coordinates: 35°48′S 150°14′E
- Country: Australia
- State: New South Wales
- LGA: Eurobodalla Shire

Government
  - State electorate: Bega
  - Federal division: Gilmore

Population
  - Total: 1,929 (2016 census)
- Postcode: 2536
Localities around Malua Bay
Surf Beach	Lilli Pilli
Mogo	Malua Bay	Tasman Sea
Woodlands	Rosedale

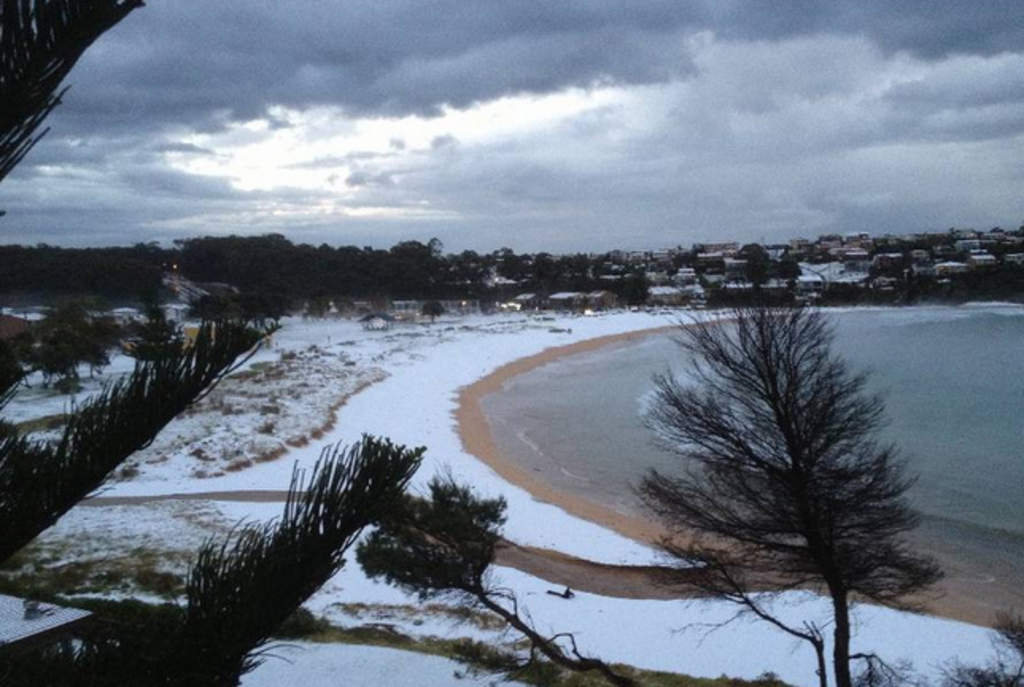
Hail on beach at Malua Bay 14 Oct 2013

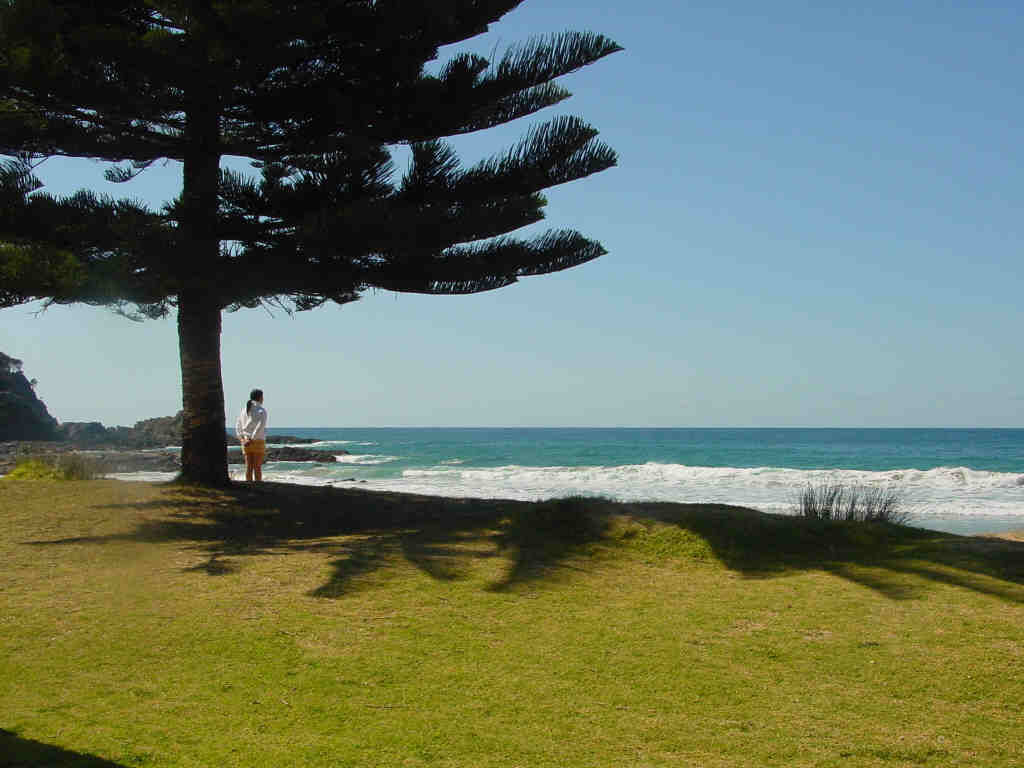
The surf at Malua Bay

Malua Bay (postcode: 2536) is a locality in the South Coast region of the state of New South Wales, Australia. It is situated in the Eurobodalla Shire. At the 2016 census, Malua Bay had a population of 1,929.

Malua Bay town centre is located astride George Bass Drive, which is approximately 13 kilometres drive from the town of Batemans Bay. The town boundaries extend to Dunns Creek Road in the West, Ridge Road to the North, and almost to Broulee Road in the South, where it abuts the town of Rosedale. Malua Bay is approximately 280 km (170 mi) South of Sydney, and 160 km (99 mi) East of Canberra via the Kings Highway.

Malua Bay has a range of beaches and bays on its border with the Tasman Sea, including; Malua Bay Beach, Mosquito Bay, Garden Bay, and McKenzies Beach. Recreational fishing is popular from the rocks at many of these beaches. Surfing is the predominant activity at McKenzies Beach and there is a public-access boat launching ramp at Mosquito Bay.

== Facilities ==
- Malua Bay website
- Batemans Bay Surf Life Saving Club
- Malua Bay Bowling & Recreation Club

== Transport ==
- Bus timetables
