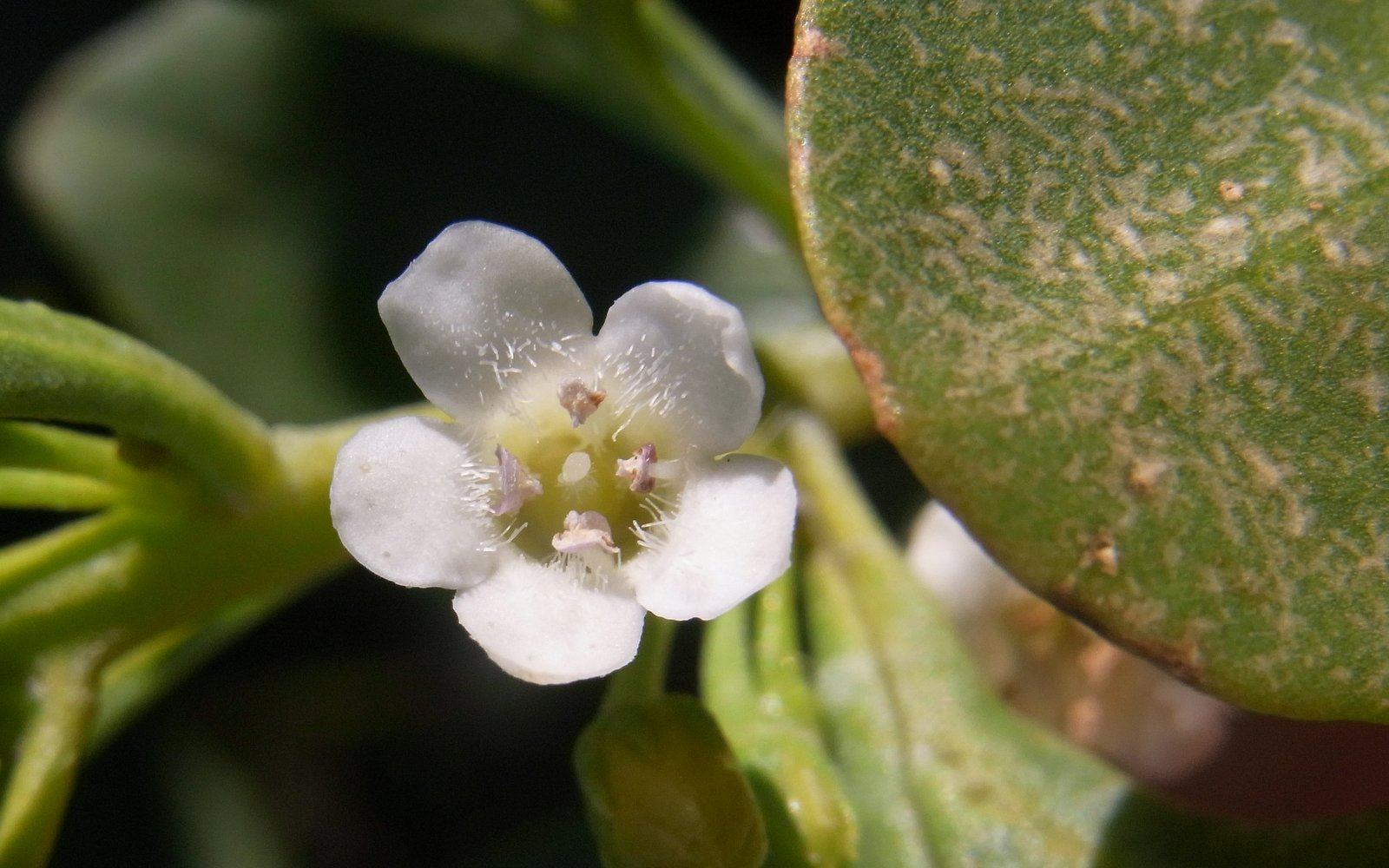

Scientific classification
- Kingdom: Plantae
- Clade: Tracheophytes
- Clade: Angiosperms
- Clade: Eudicots
- Clade: Asterids
- Order: Lamiales
- Family: Scrophulariaceae
- Genus: Myoporum
- Species: M. boninense
- Subspecies: M. b. subsp. australe

Trinomial name
- Myoporum boninense subsp. australe Chinnock

Synonyms
- Myoporum ellipticum

= Myoporum boninense subsp. australe =

Boobialla

Subspecies of shrub

Myoporum boninense subsp. australe, the boobialla, is a seaside shrub found in eastern Australia. The original specimen was collected at Batemans Bay.
