= Denhams Beach, New South Wales =

Denhams Beach
- Town
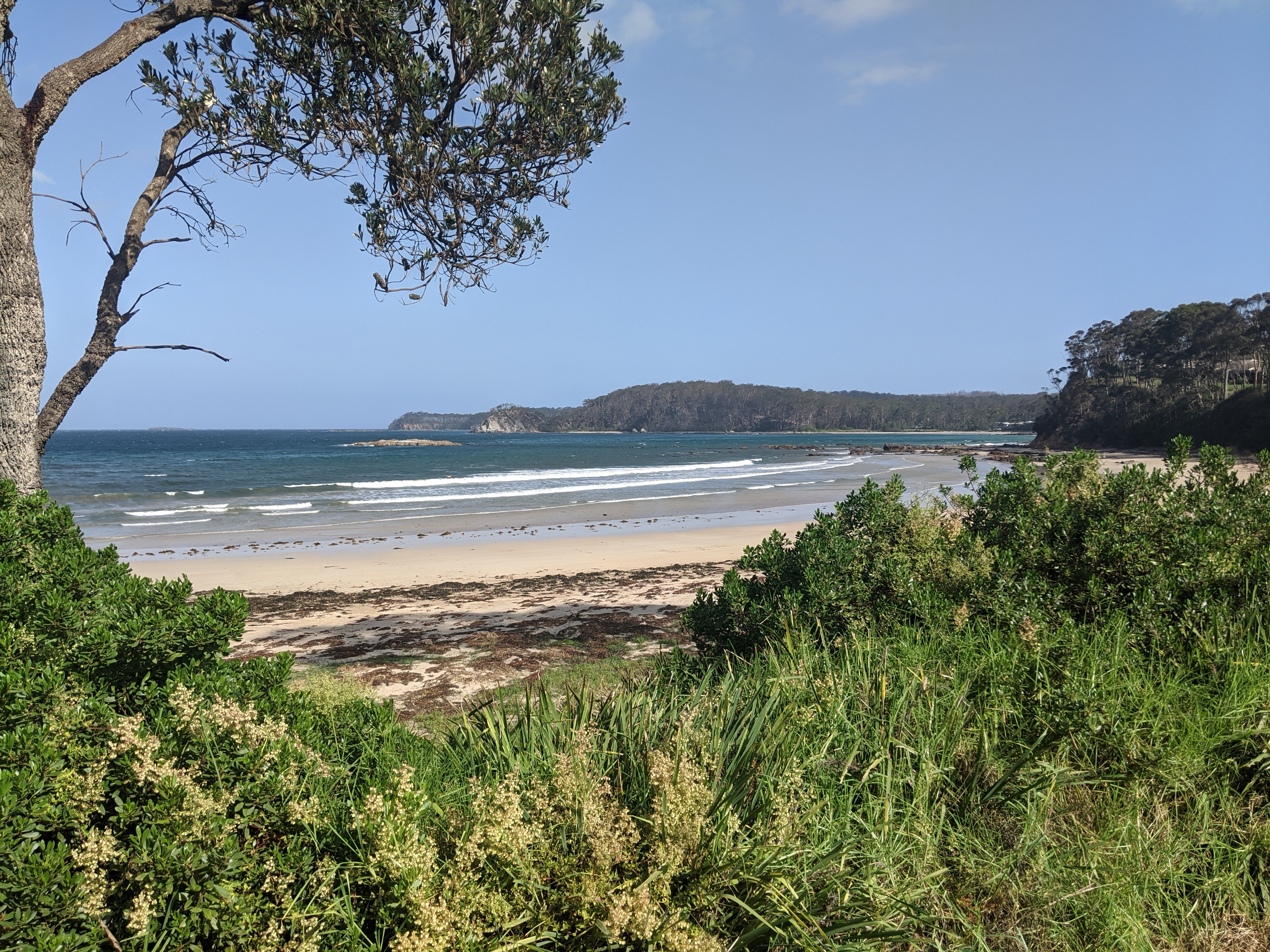
- Denhams Beach

- Coordinates: 35°44′59″S 150°12′41″E
- Country: Australia
- State: New South Wales
- Region: South Coast
- LGA: Eurobodalla Shire
- Location: 7 km (4.3 mi) SE of Batemans Bay; 285 km (177 mi) S of Sydney; 155 km (96 mi) SE of Canberra

Government
  - State electorate: Bega
  - Federal division: Gilmore

Population
  - Total: 650 (SAL 2021)
- Postcode: 2536
- County: St Vincent
- Parish: Bateman
Localities around Denhams Beach
| Sunshine Bay | Sunshine Bay |
| Sunshine Bay | Denhams Beach | Tasman Sea |
| Surf Beach | Surf Beach |

Denhams Beach is a suburb of Batemans Bay in Eurobodalla Shire, New South Wales, Australia. It lies on the Tasman Sea coast, about 7 km (4 mi) southeast of Batemans Bay and 285 km (177 mi) south of Sydney. At the 2016 census, it had a population of 648.
