= Maloneys Beach, New South Wales =

Maloneys Beach
- Town
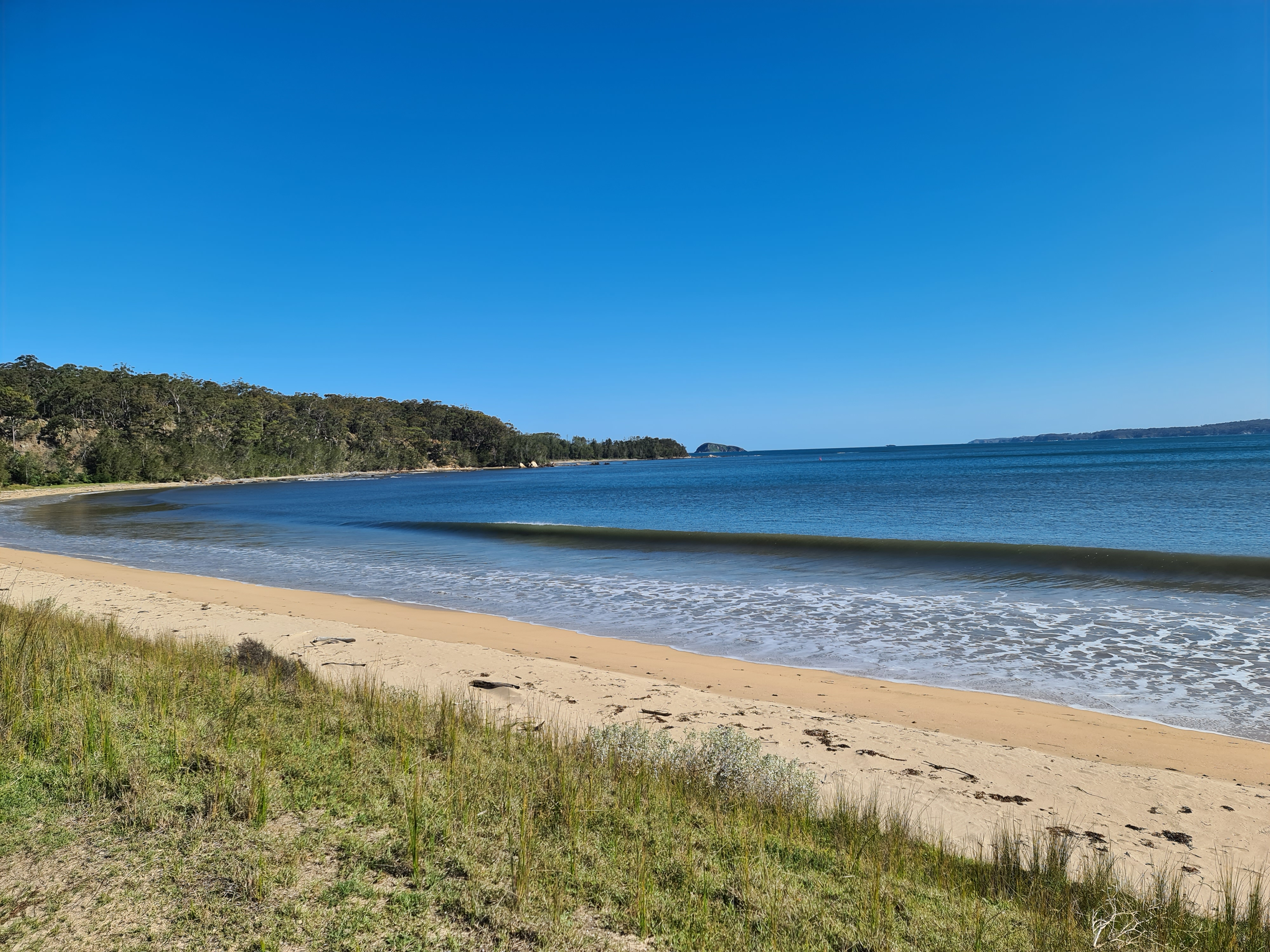

- Coordinates: 35°41′56″S 150°15′13″E
- Country: Australia
- State: New South Wales
- Region: South Coast
- LGA: Eurobodalla Shire
- Location: 13 km (8.1 mi) NE of Batemans Bay; 278 km (173 mi) S of Sydney; 157 km (98 mi) SE of Canberra

Government
  - State electorate: Bega
  - Federal division: Gilmore

Population
  - Total: 408 (SAL 2021)
- Postcode: 2536
- County: St Vincent
- Parish: Benandarah
Localities around Maloneys Beach
Long Beach	Benandarah	Benandarah
Long Beach	Maloneys Beach	Benandarah
Clyde estuary	Clyde estuary	Clyde estuary

Maloneys Beach is a suburb of Batemans Bay in Eurobodalla Shire, New South Wales, Australia. It lies on the north bank of the Clyde estuary, north of Batemans Bay and 274 km south of Sydney. At the 2016 census, it had a population of 371.
