= Batehaven, New South Wales =

Batehaven
- Town
- Coordinates: 35°44′S 150°12′E
- Country: Australia
- State: New South Wales
- LGA: Eurobodalla Shire
- Location: 281 km (175 mi) SW of Sydney; 4 km (2.5 mi) SE of Batemans Bay

Government
  - State electorate: Bega
  - Federal division: Gilmore

Population
  - Total: 1,911 (SAL 2021)
- Postcode: 2536
Localities around Batehaven
Catalina	Batemans Bay
Catalina	Batehaven	Tasman Sea
Mogo	Surf Beach	Sunshine Bay

Batehaven is a locality approximately 4 kilometres (2 mi) from Batemans Bay in south-central New South Wales. At the 2021 census it had a population of 1,911.
