= Nelligen, New South Wales =

Nelligen
- Town
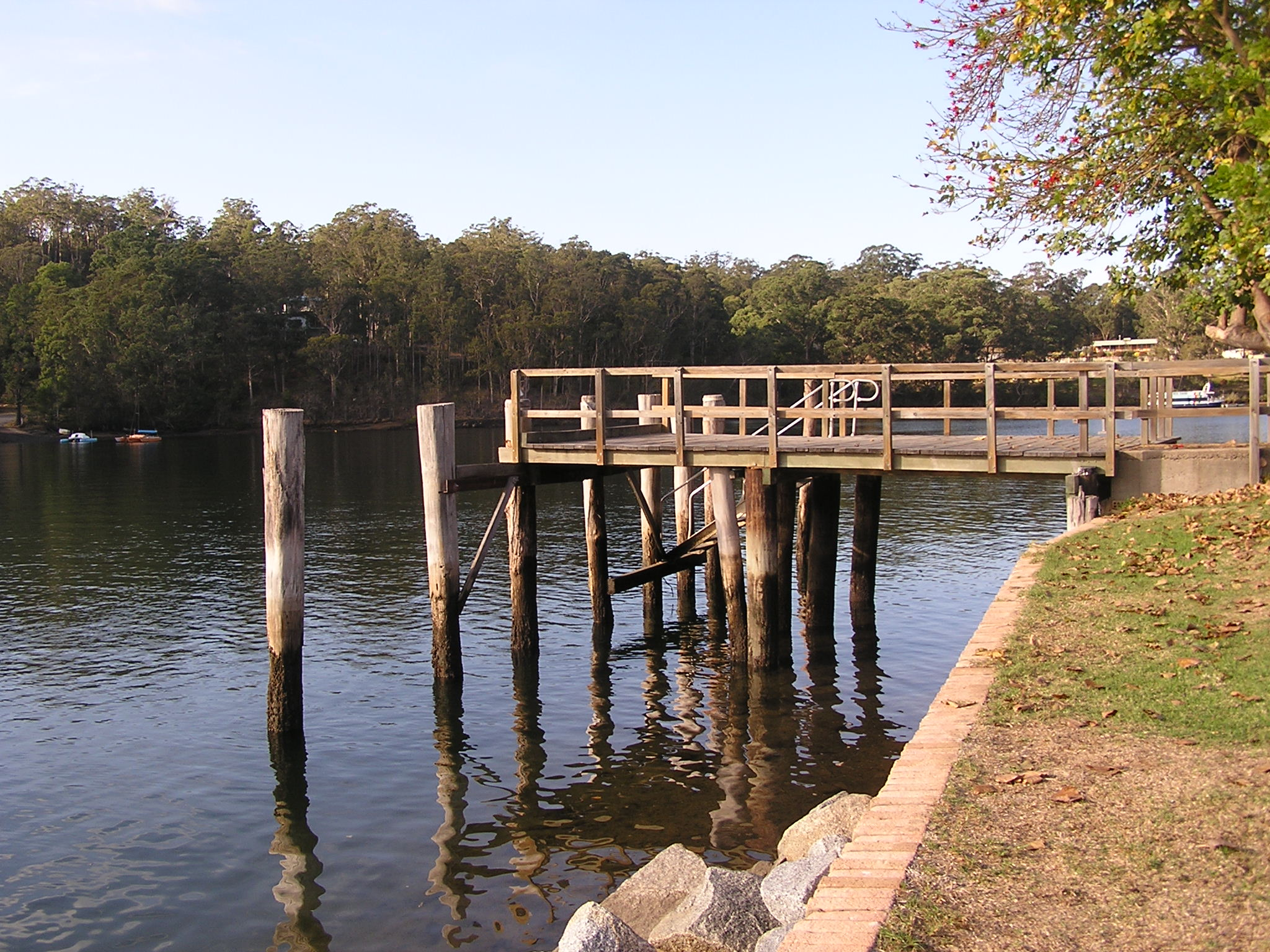
- Wharf at Nelligen on the Clyde River

- Coordinates: 35°38′51″S 150°08′29″E
- Country: Australia
- State: New South Wales
- LGA: Eurobodalla Shire
- Location: 8 km (5.0 mi) west of Batemans Bay; 285 km (177 mi) south of Sydney

Government
  - State electorate: Bega
  - Federal division: Gilmore
- Elevation: 0 m (0 ft)

Population
  - Total: 332 (2016 census)
- Postcode: 2536
Localities around Nelligen
Currowan	Currowan	Benandarah
Buckenbowra	Nelligen	Benandarah
Buckenbowra	Runnyford	North Batemans Bay

Nelligen is a village on the Clyde River on the South Coast of New South Wales, Australia. It is located on the Kings Highway.

== Location and services ==
The village is situated on the river's western bank near a junction with Nelligen Creek, and 8 km (5 mi) inland from Batemans Bay.

Local services include a general store, hotel, and general cemetery.

== History ==
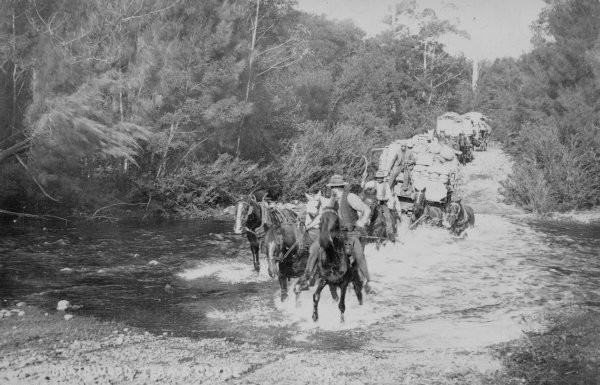
Horse teams carting goods from the ship at Nellingen to Braidwood, crossing Currajong Creek, about 1902

The original inhabitants of the land were Aboriginal people of the Walbanga, Murrinjari and Bergalia clans. The origin of the name is unclear and was already in use at the time of the first survey in 1828. The surveyor Robert Hoddle described the site of the future township as 640 acres (2.6 km^{2}) of "good forest land at Nellican Creek" and by the 1830s timber cutters had cleared a site for settlement and work had begun on a road to Batemans Bay.

The village of Nelligen was gazetted in 1854 and a road inland to Braidwood was completed two years later. No bridges existed across the Clyde at the time, so produce and minerals from southern New South Wales were delivered to Nelligen for transport by twice-weekly steamer to Sydney; the town was serviced by the Illawarra Steam Navigation Company. The post office opened in 1858 and a Protestant church was constructed in 1872. The existing Roman Catholic church dates from 1895.

By 1892 the population had grown to 500 but construction of several coastal bridges and the growth of Batemans Bay began to reduce local trading opportunities. By 1934 the population had fallen to 350, and by 2006 this had further declined to 228. At the 2016 census, it had a population of 332, although this includes the surrounding area.

Between about 1860 and 1915 there were some gold workings in the Nelligen district.

== Nelligen Bridge ==
A punt service across the Clyde River was begun at Nelligen in 1895 and continued until the Nelligen Bridge opened on 12 December 1964. A replacement bridge built by Seymour Whyte opened in February 2023 with the original demolished.

== Gallery ==
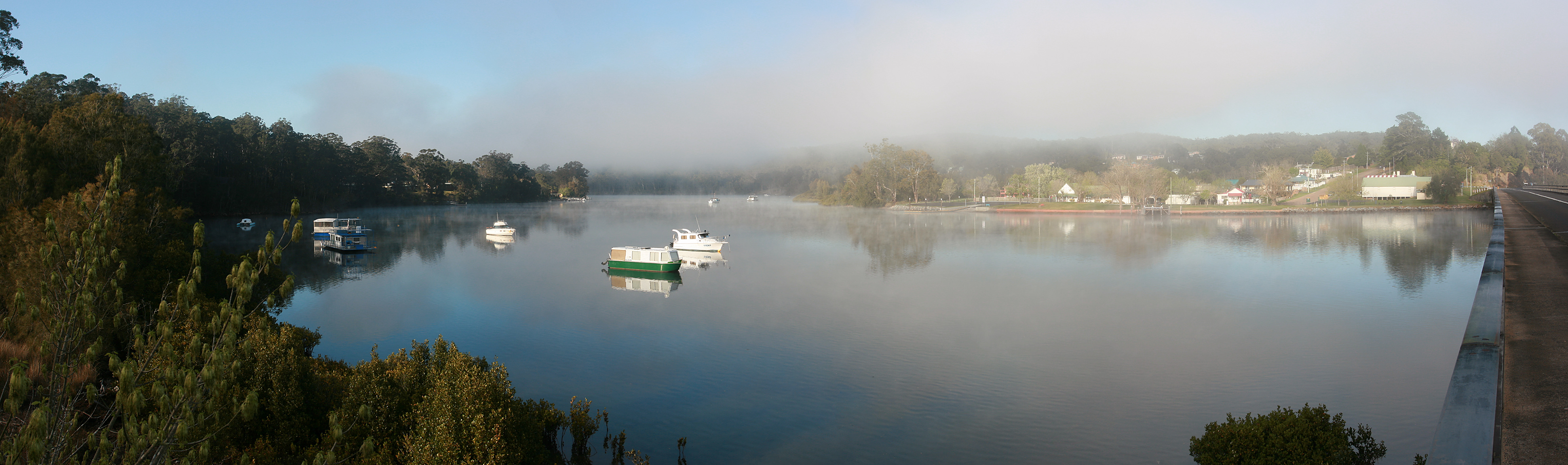
Nelligen viewed across the Clyde River in the early morning mist; to the right is the 1964 built Kings Highway road bridge at the location of the former punt service.

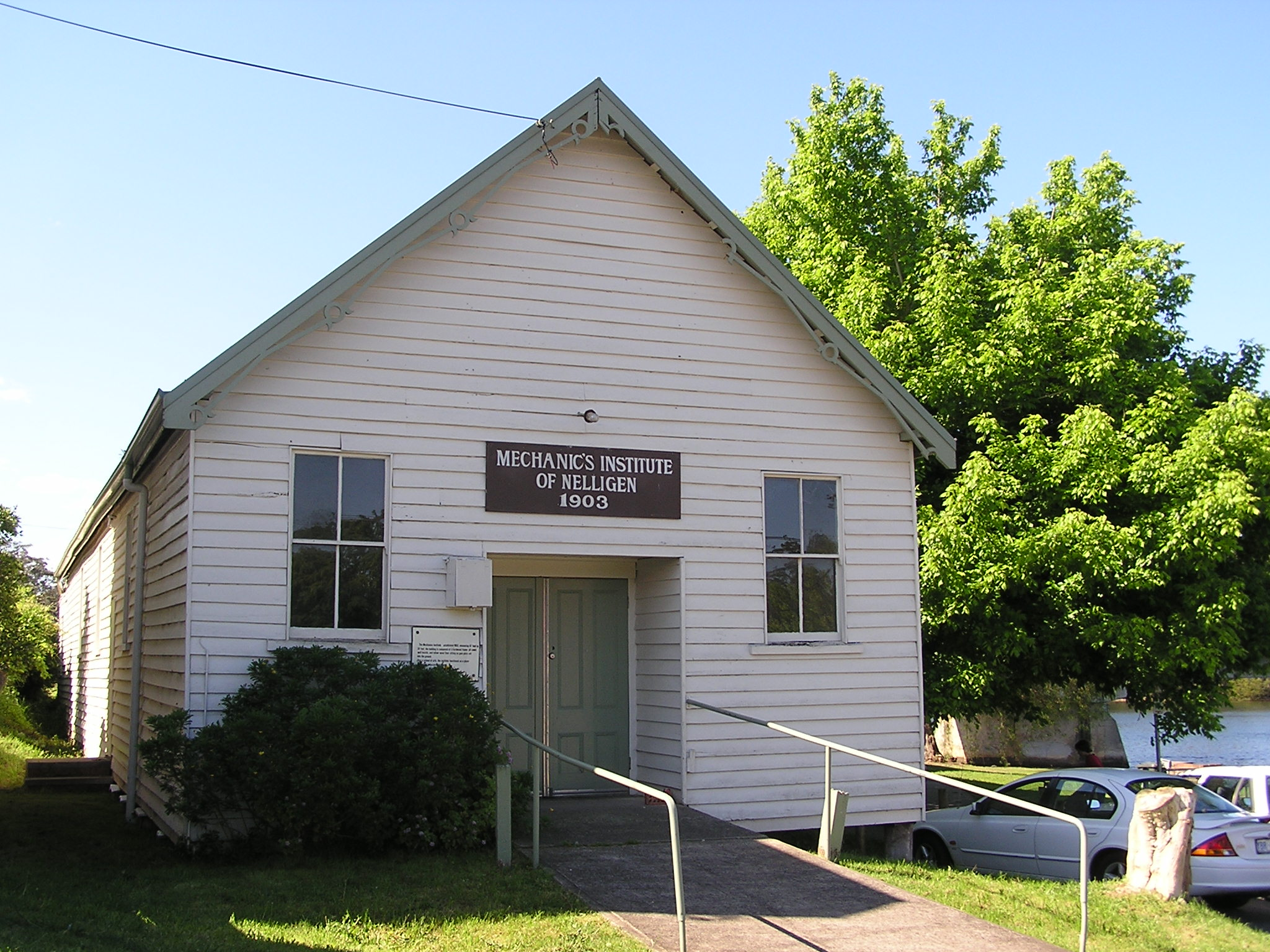
Mechanics' Institute at Nelligen, New South Wales built 1903
