= Lillipilli =

Lillipilli or Lilly Pilly may refer to:

- One of two suburbs in New South Wales, Australia:
  - Lilli Pilli, New South Wales, a small suburb in southern Sydney
  - Lilli Pilli (Eurobodalla), a suburb on the New South Wales South Coast
- Any of several genera of plants commonly known as lillipilli, including:
  - Syzygium, water apples, rose apples
  - Waterhousea, weeping lilly pilly
