= Catalina Club =

Golf club in New South Wales

Coordinates: 35.7199°S 150.1895°E

Catalina Club, also known as Catalina Country Club, is a golf club in Catalina, on the New South Wales South Coast. Catalina Club was established as Bateman's Bay Golf Club in 1920 and contains a 27-hole golf course.

== History ==
Catalina Club was established in 1920 as the Bateman's Bay Golf Club, with members (men) and associates (women). The Batemans Bay Golf Club was the headquarters of the Golfing South Coast and Tablelands Association.

In 1955, Catalina Club had land set aside to build an 18 hole course. In 1968, Catalina Club opened its first 18-hole course with a tournament and ceremony presented by the NSW Golf Association.

A pro-am was organised at Catalina Club by the Batemans Bay Lions Club in February 1974. Vic Bennetts won with a score of 137. Prize money was A$6,000.

Catalina Club hosted the South Coast Open, a professional golf tournament between 1975 and 1978 with prize money ranging from A$10,000 to A$15,000.

== See also ==
- South Coast Open
