= Catalina, New South Wales =

Catalina
- Town
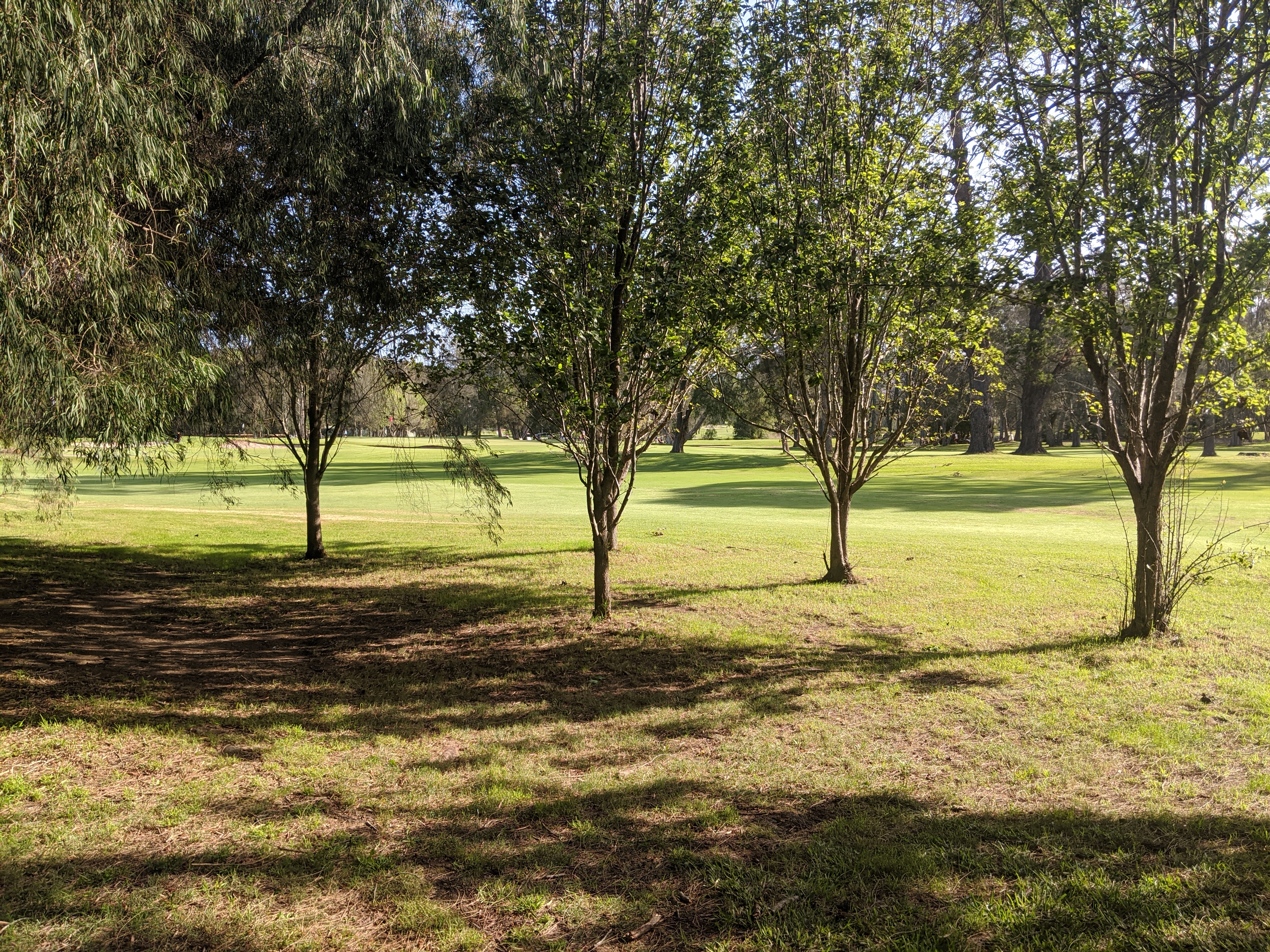
- Catalina Country Club

- Coordinates: 35°43′24″S 150°11′15″E
- Country: Australia
- State: New South Wales
- Region: South Coast
- LGA: Eurobodalla Shire
- Location: 6 km (3.7 mi) SE of Batemans Bay; 285 km (177 mi) S of Sydney; 150 km (93 mi) SE of Canberra

Government
  - State electorate: Bega
  - Federal division: Gilmore

Population
  - Total: 2,522 (SAL 2021)
- Postcode: 2536
- County: St Vincent
- Parish: Bateman
Localities around Catalina
| Batemans Bay | Batemans Bay | Batemans Bay |
| Batemans Bay | Catalina | Batehaven |
| Batemans Bay | Mogo | Batehaven |

Catalina is a suburb of Batemans Bay in Eurobodalla Shire, New South Wales, Australia. It lies near the Tasman Sea coast, about 3 km southeast of Batemans Bay and 285 km south of Sydney. At the 2016 census, it had a population of 2,334.
