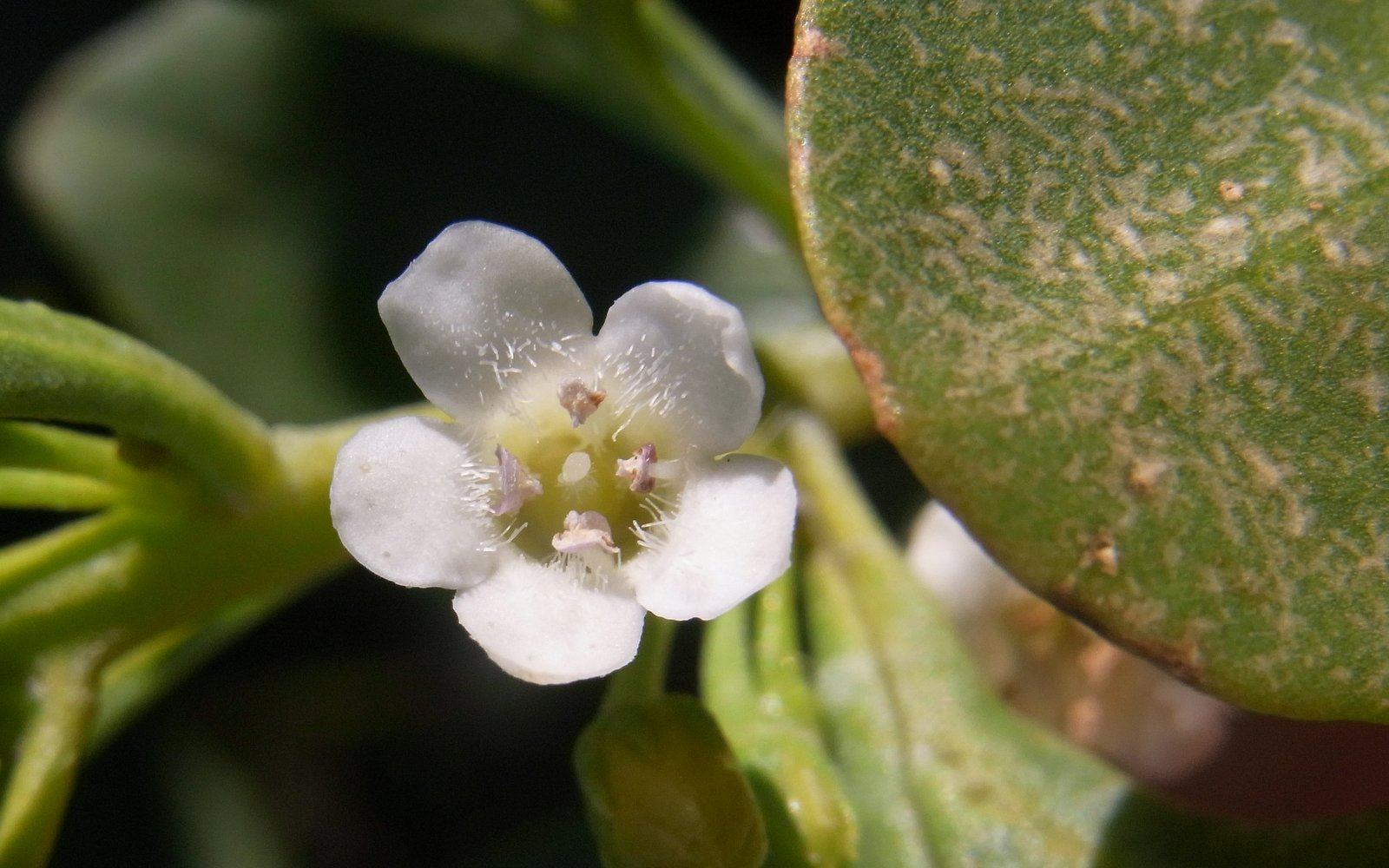
- Myoporum boninense at Bilgola

Scientific classification
- Kingdom: Plantae
- Clade: Tracheophytes
- Clade: Angiosperms
- Clade: Eudicots
- Clade: Asterids
- Order: Lamiales
- Family: Scrophulariaceae
- Genus: Myoporum
- Species: M. boninense

Binomial name
- Myoporum boninense Koidz.

= Myoporum boninense =

Species of shrub

Myoporum boninense is a plant in the figwort family, Scrophulariaceae. It is a shrub with thick, fleshy, glossy leaves, white flowers in small groups and shiny lilac to pale purple fruits. It grows in coastal heath in New South Wales and Queensland in Australia and on islands in the north west Pacific Ocean.

== Description ==
Myoporum boninense is a shrub, sometimes prostrate, others erect or spreading. It grows to a height of 2 metres (7 ft) high and usually lacks the wart-like tubercles of other members of the genus. The leaves are arranged alternately and are usually thick, often fleshy, 12–70 millimetres (0.5–3 in) long, 5.5–36 millimetres (0.2–1 in) wide. They are egg-shaped, sometimes with the narrow end towards the base and both surfaces are glossy and glabrous.

The flowers are arranged in groups of 1 to 8 on a stalk 5–15 millimetres (0.2–0.6 in) long in the axils of the leaves and have 5 sepals and 5 white petals joined at their base to form a tube. The tube is 2–4 millimetres (0.08–0.2 in) long and hairy in the upper part, the lobes are 2–3 millimetres (0.08–0.1 in) long and hairy on the inner part. There are 4 stamens which sometimes fill the upper part of the hypanthium. Flowering occurs in spring and summer and is followed by fruits which are drupes 5–10 millimetres (0.2–0.4 in) in diameter and shiny pink, sometimes cream blotched with purple.

== Taxonomy and naming ==
Myoporum boninense was first formally described in 1918 by Gen-ichi Koidzumi in the Botanical Magazine (Tokyo). The specific epithet (boninense) refers to the Bonin Islands.

There are two subspecies:

- Myoporum boninense Koidz. subsp. boninense occurs on the Bonin Islands to the south west of the main islands of Japan to the Mariana Islands, growing on coral limestone and sand near the sea;
- Myoporum boninense subsp. australe Chinnock occurs in New South Wales and Queensland, growing as a prostrate shrub on rocky headlands or as a taller shrub along estuarine creeks.

== Distribution and habitat ==
Myoporum boninense occurs in coastal environments, often close to the sea in eastern Australia and smaller islands to its north.

== Uses ==
=== Indigenous uses ===
Aboriginal people used the fruit of Myoporum boninense to add flavour to cooked foods. They were usually considered too bitter to be eaten raw.

Used in amenity horticulture as a ground cover and looks best with regular trimming.
