= 2022 Bega state by-election =

- 12 February 2022

Electoral district of Bega in the New South Wales Legislative Assembly
- Registered: 58,785
- Turnout: 85.70% (▼4.06)

	First party	Second party
Candidate	Michael Holland	Fiona Kotvojs
Party	Labor	Liberal
Primary vote	21,361	19,165
Percentage	43.16%	38.72%
Swing	▲12.57	▼10.18
TCP	55.06%	44.94%
TCP change	▲11.99	▼11.99
MP before election
Andrew Constance
Liberal
Elected MP
Michael Holland
Labor

A by-election was held in the New South Wales Legislative Assembly seat of Bega in on 12 February 2022. The by-election was triggered by the resignation of Liberal MP and frontbencher Andrew Constance, who resigned to unsuccessfully contest the federal seat of Gilmore at the 2022 Australian federal election.

It was held on the same day as by-elections for the districts of Monaro, Strathfield and Willoughby. The writs for election were issued on 21 January 2022. Nominations for candidates closed seven days later at noon on 27 January, with the ballot paper draw commencing in the morning of 28 January.

The NSW Electoral Commission pre-emptively sent postal ballots to all voters registered on the state electoral roll, under a regulation in a COVID amendment to the Electoral Act. Postal votes will be checked against in-person voting rolls to prevent double voting. The iVote online voting system was not used at these elections after the system failed during the NSW local government elections in December 2021.

Early results showed a swing of more than 13% towards Labor in the seat, suggesting it would be won by Michael Holland, the first time the seat of Bega would be held by the Australian Labor Party (ALP) since it was created in 1988. Holland claimed victory just before 9pm on election night. The Liberals' Fiona Kotvojs conceded nine days later on 21 February.

== Candidates ==
Candidates are listed in the order they appeared on the ballot.

Party	Candidate	Background	Notes
Independent	Jeffrey Hawkins		
Sustainable Australia	Karin Geiselhart		
Independent	Ursula Bennett		
Labor	Michael Holland	Obstetrician and gynaecologist	
Greens	Peter Haggar	Cafe owner	
Shooters, Fishers and Farmers	Victor Hazir		
Liberal	Fiona Kotvojs	Business owner and farmer	

== Results ==
2022 Bega state by-election
Party	Candidate	Votes	%	±%
Labor	Michael Holland	21,361	43.16	+12.57
Liberal	Fiona Kotvojs	19,165	38.72	−10.18
Greens	Peter Haggar	3,453	6.98	–2.78
Shooters, Fishers, Farmers	Victor Hazir	2,312	4.67	−1.79
Independent	Jeffrey Hawkins	1,379	2.79	+2.79
Sustainable Australia	Karin Geiselhart	1,011	2.04	+2.04
Independent	Ursula Bennett	811	1.64	+1.64
Total formal votes		49,492	98.25	+1.07
Informal votes		884	1.75	−1.07
Turnout		50,376	85.70	−4.06
Two-party-preferred result
Labor	Michael Holland	24,837	55.06	+11.99
Liberal	Fiona Kotvojs	20,269	44.94	−11.99
Labor gain from Liberal		Swing	+11.99	

== See also ==
- Electoral results for the district of Bega
- List of New South Wales state by-elections
