= Long Beach, New South Wales =

Long Beach
- Town
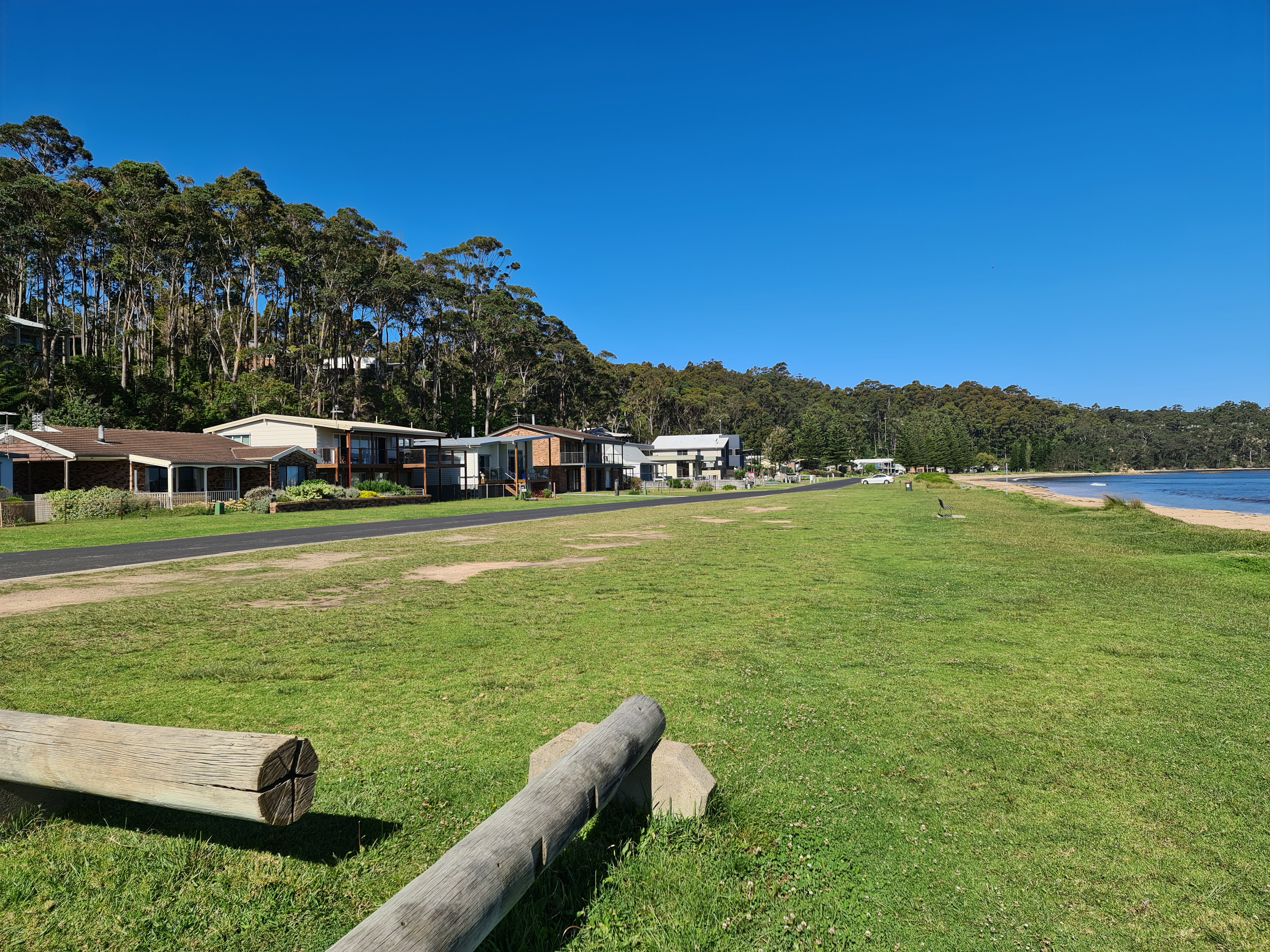

- Coordinates: 35°41′54″S 150°14′04″E
- Country: Australia
- State: New South Wales
- Region: South Coast
- LGA: Eurobodalla Shire
- Location: 10 km (6.2 mi) NE of Batemans Bay; 277 km (172 mi) S of Sydney; 156 km (97 mi) SE of Canberra

Government
  - State electorate: Bega
  - Federal division: Gilmore

Population
  - Total: 1,758 (SAL 2021)
- Postcode: 2536
- County: St Vincent
- Parish: Benandarah
Localities around Long Beach
Benandarah	Benandarah	Maloneys Beach
Surfside	Long Beach	Maloneys Beach
Batemans Bay	Clyde estuary	Clyde estuary

Long Beach is a suburb of Batemans Bay in Eurobodalla Shire, New South Wales, Australia. It lies on the north bank of the Clyde estuary, north of Batemans Bay and 274 km south of Sydney. At the 2016 census, it had a population of 1,436.

The community is served by the Long Beach Community Association (LBCA) www.longbeach.org.au
