= Surf Beach, New South Wales =

Surf Beach
- Town
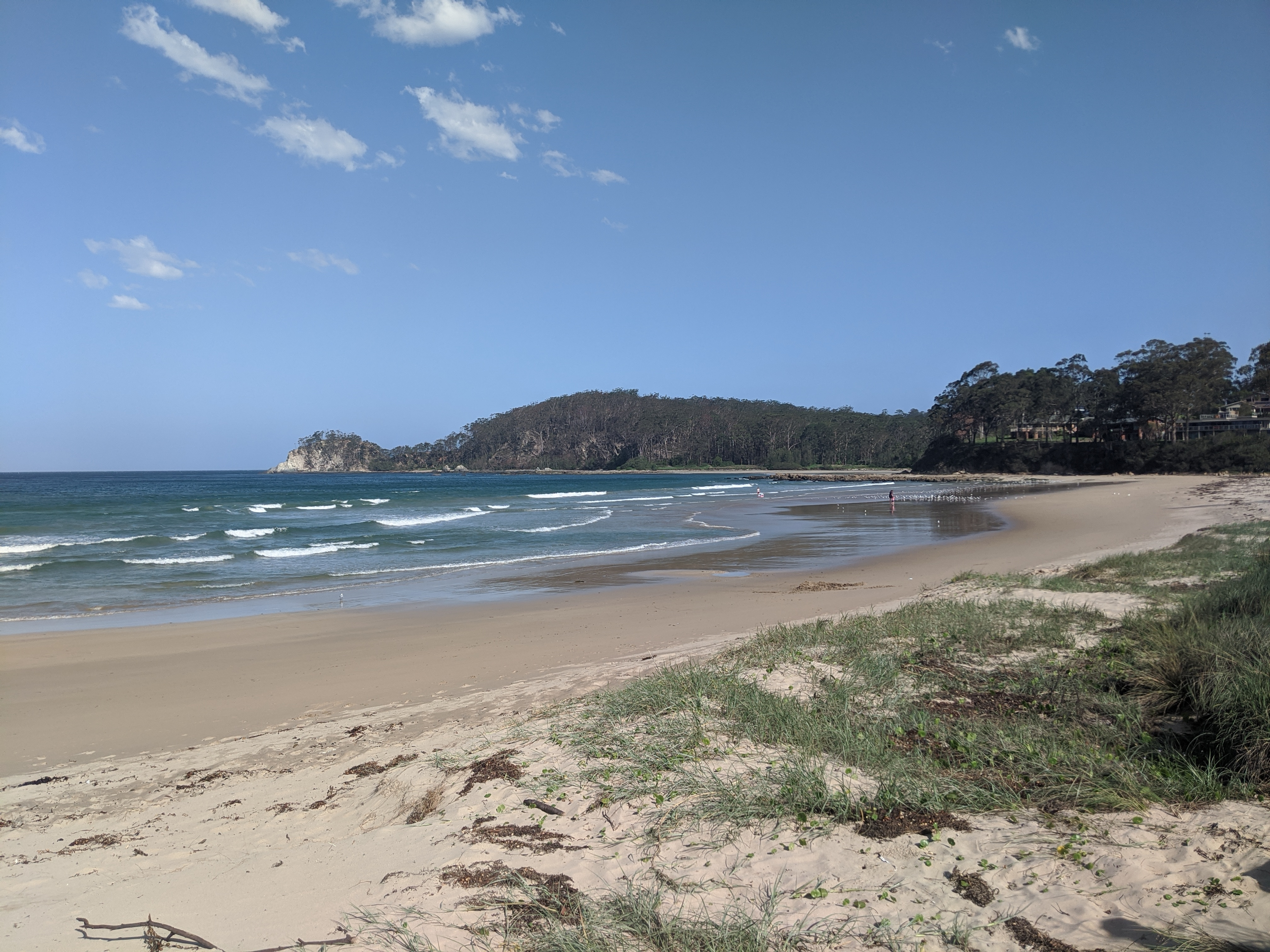
- Surf Beach

- Coordinates: 35°45′45″S 150°12′20″E
- Country: Australia
- State: New South Wales
- Region: South Coast
- LGA: Eurobodalla Shire
- Location: 10 km (6.2 mi) SE of Batemans Bay; 285 km (177 mi) S of Sydney; 155 km (96 mi) SE of Canberra

Government
  - State electorate: Bega
  - Federal division: Gilmore

Population
  - Total: 1,934 (SAL 2021)
- Postcode: 2536
- County: St Vincent
- Parish: Bateman
Localities around Surf Beach
Batehaven	Denhams Beach
Mogo	Surf Beach	Tasman Sea
Mogo	Malua Bay	Lilli Pilli

Surf Beach is a suburb of Batemans Bay in Eurobodalla Shire, New South Wales, Australia. It lies on the Tasman Sea coast, about 10 km southeast of Batemans Bay and 285 km south of Sydney. At the 2016 census, it had a population of 1,874.
