= Lilli Pilli (Eurobodalla) =

- Town
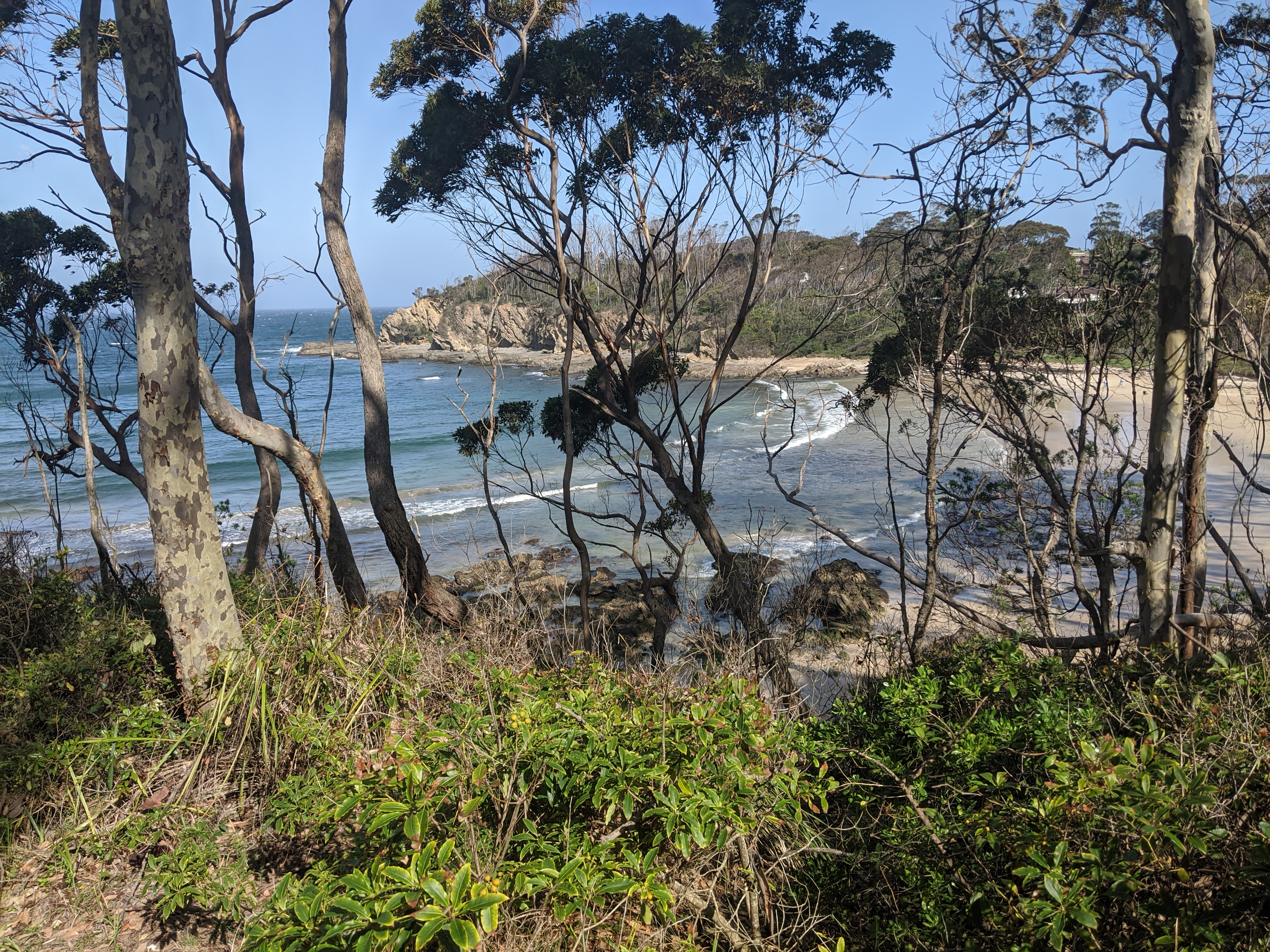
- Lilli Pilli Beach

- Coordinates: 35°46′27″S 150°13′44″E
- Country: Australia
- State: New South Wales
- Region: South Coast
- LGA: Eurobodalla Shire
- Location: 10 km (6.2 mi) SE of Batemans Bay; 285 km (177 mi) S of Sydney; 155 km (96 mi) SE of Canberra

Government
  - State electorate: Bega
  - Federal division: Gilmore

Population
  - Total: 647 (SAL 2021)
- Postcode: 2536
- County: St Vincent
- Parish: Bateman
Localities around Lilli Pilli
Surf Beach
Malua Bay	Lilli Pilli	Tasman Sea
Malua Bay	Malua Bay

Lilli Pilli is a suburb of Batemans Bay in Eurobodalla Shire, New South Wales, Australia. It lies on the Tasman Sea coast, about 10 km southeast of Batemans Bay and 285 km south of Sydney. At the 2016 census, it had a population of 629.
