= Michael Holland (politician) =

Australian politician

Michael Holland MP

Member of the New South Wales Parliament for Bega
- Incumbent
- Assumed office 12 February 2022
- Preceded by: Andrew Constance

Parliamentary Secretary for Health and Regional Health
- Incumbent
- Assumed office 26 April 2023
- Minister: Ryan Park
- Preceded by: Justin Clancy

Personal details
- Born: 24 September 1957 (age 68)
- Party: Labor
- Occupation: Obstetrician; Gynaecologist; Politician
- Website: website

Michael Joseph Holland (born 24 September 1957) is an Australian politician and former obstetrician in southern NSW. He is a member of the Australian Labor Party (ALP) and was elected at the 2022 Bega state by-election for the New South Wales Legislative Assembly.

Holland is an obstetrician and gynaecologist who resigned from the Southern NSW Local Health District over concerns around maternity practices at Moruya Hospital. In 2021, he was preselected to run for the Labor Party in the 2022 Bega state by-election, held following the resignation of Liberal MP Andrew Constance. He won the seat on 14 February 2022 with a swing of 12%.

== Early life and education ==
Holland first grew up in Bankstown, Sydney where he lived above a pub managed by his parents for five years. From early on he experienced the effects of alcohol abuse and domestic violence in his family. He attended Waverley College from 1966 to 1975. Holland completed a Bachelor of Medicine and Bachelor of Surgery at the University of New South Wales, graduating in 1981.

== Career ==
Holland trained at St George Hospital, Sydney and at the West Middlesex Hospital in London, obtaining a Fellowship of the Royal Australian and New Zealand College of Obstetrics and Gynaecology in 1991. He started working as a visiting medical officer (VMO) at the John Hunter Hospital in Newcastle for 10 years. During this time Michael was a consultant in the NSW Perinatal Transfer Advisory Service. In 2003 he started work at the Moruya District Hospital, for which he would stay at for nearly 20 years. While working in Moruya he eventually reached District Lead Obstetrics and Gynaecology at the Southern NSW Local Health District in 2020 but later resigned due to a review into maternity services 'completely ignoring the root cause of our unsafe neo natal services ... that is, the Southern NSW LHD ... are failing to provide paediatric services to the largest rural maternity service in our region'.

== Politics ==
Holland was elected in the 2022 Bega state by-election, with a 12.57-point swing, following the resignation of Liberal MP Andrew Constance. He is the first representative for Bega to be a member of the Australian Labor Party. Holland advocates on health, housing affordability, mental health, and regional issues. He was re-elected in the 2023 NSW general election with a further swing of 17.3%

On 11 May 2023, while Trish Doyle was giving a speech in the Legislative Assembly, a person with orthostatic intolerance collapsed in the public galleries. Holland jumped over from the chamber to the public galleries to assist the man and check his vitals, then put him in the recovering position and called paramedics. Holland was called a hero by the man who collapsed.

== Personal life ==
Holland's has spoken about the mental health issues within his family.

- Holland's father was an alcoholic after serving during WW2 and abused Holland's mother.
- Holland's late brother had an alcohol addiction, mental health issues and was homeless.
- Two of Holland's daughters overdosed on medication due to mental health crises.
- Holland has also recounted his own troubles with suicidal thoughts and depression.

New South Wales Legislative Assembly
Preceded by Andrew Constance	Member for Bega; 2022–present	Incumbent
