= Russell Smith (Australian politician) =

Australian politician

Russell Harold Lester Smith (born 22 November 1946) is an Australian politician. He was a Liberal Party member of the New South Wales Legislative Assembly from 1988 to 2003, representing the electorate of Bega.

Smith was a farmer and businessman before entering state politics. He had also served as a councillor and deputy president of both the Bombala Council and the Monaro County Council. Smith was preselected as the Liberal candidate for the newly re-established safe Liberal seat of electoral district of Bega at the 1988 election and was easily elected. He was re-elected three more times, and retired at the 2003 election, when he was succeeded by Andrew Constance.

New South Wales Legislative Assembly
New district	Member for Bega; 1988 – 2003	Succeeded by Andrew Constance
