= Thomas Rawlinson (politician) =

Australian politician

Thomas Rawlinson (1847 – 21 July 1928) was an English-born Australian politician.

Born in Kent to stonemason William Rawlinson and Eliza Underdown, Rawlinson arrived in New South Wales with his family around 1852. He attended Sydney Grammar School and studied law at the University of Sydney, being admitted as a solicitor in 1870. He then moved to Bega, where he became partner in Rawlinson & Bland. On 14 November 1877 he married Sarah Ritchie, with whom he had eight children. In 1884 he was Bega's first mayor. He served as the Protectionist member for Bega from 1894 to 1895 in the New South Wales Legislative Assembly. He died at Bellevue Hill in 1928.

New South Wales Legislative Assembly
New seat	Member for Bega; 1894–1895	Succeeded by Henry Clarke
