= Batemans Bay =

- Town
- The Batemans Bay CBD by the Clyde River shore

- Coordinates: 35°42′29″S 150°10′28″E
- Country: Australia
- State: New South Wales
- Region: South Coast
- LGA: Eurobodalla Shire
- Location: 280 km (170 mi) SSW of Sydney; 762 km (473 mi) ENE of Melbourne; 151 km (94 mi) ESE of Canberra; 55 km (34 mi) SW of Ulladulla; 25 km (16 mi) N of Moruya
- Established: 1885

Government
  - State electorate: Bega
  - Federal division: Gilmore
- Elevation: 5 m (16 ft)

Population
  - Total: 17,519 (2021)
- Time zone: UTC+10 (AEST)
  - Summer (DST): UTC+11 (AEDT)
- Postcode: 2536
- County: St Vincent
- Mean max temp: 21.8 °C (71.2 °F)
- Mean min temp: 10.0 °C (50.0 °F)
- Annual rainfall: 916.8 mm (36.09 in)
Localities around Batemans Bay
Nelligen	North Batemans Bay	Surfside
Runnyford	Batemans Bay	Tasman Sea
Runnyford	Mogo	Batehaven

Batemans Bay is a town in the South Coast region of the state of New South Wales, Australia. Batemans Bay is administered by the Eurobodalla Shire council. The town is situated on the shores of an estuary formed where the Clyde River meets the southern Pacific Ocean.

Batemans Bay is located on the Princes Highway (Highway 1) about 280 kilometres (170 mi) from Sydney and 760 km (470 mi) from Melbourne. Canberra is located about 151 km (94 mi) to the west of Batemans Bay, via the Kings Highway. At the 2021 census, Batemans Bay had a population of 17,519.

It is the closest seaside town to Canberra, making Batemans Bay a popular holiday destination for residents of Australia's national capital. Geologically, it is situated in the far southern reaches of the Sydney Basin.

Batemans Bay is also a popular retiree haven, but has begun to attract young families seeking affordable housing and a relaxed seaside lifestyle. Other local industries include oyster farming, forestry, eco-tourism and retail services.

== Greater Batemans Bay ==
Several settlements are recognised by the Eurobodalla Shire Council as part of the Greater Batemans Bay area. These include:

- Batemans Bay
- Batehaven, New South Wales
- Catalina, New South Wales
- Denhams Beach, New South Wales
- Lilli Pilli (Eurobodalla)
- Long Beach, New South Wales
- Malua Bay, New South Wales
- Maloneys Beach, New South Wales
- North Batemans Bay
- Sunshine Bay, New South Wales
- Surf Beach, New South Wales
- Surfside, New South Wales

== History ==
=== Indigenous history ===
The traditional custodians of the land surrounding Batemans Bay are the Walbunja people of the Yuin nation.

The language spoken by the Walbunja people is Dhurga, one of the Yuin–Kuric languages.

A number of sites in the region are considered culturally significant to the Walbunja people, such as Bhundoo and Hanging Rock.

The Walbunja name for the bay is Yangary.

==== Indigenous population ====
According to the 2021 census, there were a total of 8,581 people in the Batemans Bay urban centre. Aboriginal and Torres Strait Islander people made up 8.3% of the population, significantly higher than the state average of 3.4% and national average of 3.2%.

=== European history ===
On 22 April 1770, explorer James Cook first sighted and named the bay. Cook gave no reason for the name, which may commemorate either Nathaniel Bateman, the captain of HMS Northumberland when Cook was serving as her master from 1760 to 1762, or John Bateman, 2nd Viscount Bateman, a former Lord Commissioner of the Admiralty in the 1750s.

A colonial vessel, Fly, was driven into Batemans Bay by bad weather during April 1808. Her crew engaged in a conflict with the local Indigenous people, initially firing muskets from the vessel. In response, the indigenous people threw spears against the crew, resulting in three Fly fatalities. In 1821, Lt Robert Johnston entered the bay and explored the lower reaches of the Clyde River on board the cutter Snapper. Snapper Island within the bay is named after Johnston's ship. Johnston returned with Alexander Berry and Hamilton Hume and they traced the river to its source. When the district was surveyed in 1828, a deserted hut and stockyards were found. Cedar getters and land clearers were in the district in the 1820s. From 1820s through to the 1840s, the area to the Moruya River was the southernmost official limit of location for the colony of New South Wales.

The Illawarra and South Coast Steam Navigation Co found the Clyde River to be navigable in 1854. Regular services by the company in the 1860s and 1870s contributed to growth of the district.

The village of China Bay was surveyed in 1859. Oyster farming commenced in 1860, and by 1870, there was a fleet of 40 oyster boats. A sawmill was erected in 1870. The port and town was proclaimed in 1885. A ferry service across the Clyde ran from 1891 until the bridge was opened in 1956. In 1942, during World War II, a trawler was attacked by a Japanese submarine between Batemans Bay and Moruya.

==== European population ====
The change of population of Batemans Bay since 1881.

- 1881 was 266
- 1961 was 1,183
- 1981 was 4,924
- 1996 was 9,568
- 2006 was 10,845
- 2011 was 11,334
- 2021 was 15,134

=== 2016 flying fox plague ===
In May 2016, an estimated 120,000 grey-headed flying fox (bats) suddenly descended upon and swarmed the town, prompting the town to declare a state of emergency. The grey-headed flying fox is listed as a vulnerable species threatened by extinction and is protected by conservation laws; due to this status, they had to be removed using non-lethal methods, including smoke, noise, lights and removal of vegetation. The town received AUS$2.5 million to relocate the bats.

=== 2019–20 bushfire emergency ===
In December 2019, the town was under the threat of a catastrophic bushfire, which ultimately cut Batemans Bay off from all external road links, isolating the town during what was usually a busy tourist season.

The bushfire gradually increased in intensity and severity, peaking on New Year's Eve and rapidly moving towards the town. Thousands of locals sheltered at beaches around the town, a large number of buildings were lost, and lingering economic damage.

Due to the difficult mountainous terrain surrounding Batemans Bay, much of the firefighting efforts could only be fought from the air, with a number of firefighting aircraft tasked to defend the town. With the difficulties of the highway closures cutting the town off from links on the ground, Moruya Airport proved to be a vital resource in the protection of the local region from the devastating bushfires.

== Demographics ==
According to the 2021 census of population, there were 8,581 people in the Batemans Bay urban centre.

- Aboriginal and Torres Strait Islander people made up 8.3% of the population.
- 77.8% of people were born in Australia. The next most common countries of birth were England 4.9% and New Zealand 1.3%.
- 88% of people only spoke English at home.
- The most common responses for religion were No Religion 39.4%, Catholic 20.1% and Anglican 19.4%.

The median age in Batemans Bay is 51 years, compared with the Australian median of 38 years. The proportion of residents aged 60 or older is above the national average, while the proportion aged 70 or older is twice the national average. Age groups below 60 are represented at lower rates than the national averages, with the greatest difference occurring among people aged 19 to 35.

This skewed demographic is attributed to Batemans Bay's proximity to Canberra, from where it attracts a large number of retirees. In recent years, community concern has grown as hotels and resorts in the region have been purchased and converted to aged care and retirement living, creating a perceived threat to the town's primary industry – tourism. In addition, the aged demographic has been said to create a culture were the towns infrastructure is geared towards the aged, resulting in a net migration away from Batemans Bay of younger families exacerbating the imbalance. In 2015, research from Nielsen revealed older people were less likely to support rates funding towards youth focussed infrastructure.

== Arts and culture ==
=== River of Art ===
The annual River of Art festival was founded in 2004. As of 2024, the arts festival stretches over 11 days finishing at the end of the October long weekend. Supported by the Shire Council and run by a board of volunteers, it includes all forms of visual art as well as performances, music, and creative workshops.

=== Sculpture on Clyde ===
A ten-day art festival celebrating imagination in 3D, debuted in 2017 as a bold new acquisitive art prize. Set along the foreshore of the Clyde River, it is one of Australia's richest 3D art prizes. Presented by The Batemans Bay Tourism and Business Chamber, the festival is open to professional, emerging and novice artists worldwide with 2018 prize money to the value of $70,000. The inaugural acquisitive prize was won by Dora A. Rognvaldsdottir for Duet.

=== South Tribe and Cultivate Space ===
Leading up to 2018, a number of digital creatives and artists moved into Batemans Bay's industrial estate, into a space called the South Tribe and Cultivate Space which served as business and arts incubators. On 26 July 2020, the owners of South Tribe and Cultivate Space announced the closure of the centre on their Facebook page, citing difficulties with the COVID-19 pandemic in Australia.

=== Bay Pavilions ===
In 2018, an indoor aquatic and cultural centre was proposed for Mackay Park precinct, which would include a purpose-built exhibition and performance centre, as well as workshop and storage space that would serve the wider region's 18 art, dance, and theatre groups. The A$46-million proposal generated some controversy in the community, as it meant replacing the existing 50-metre pool with a 25-metre one. However, it went ahead and the aquatic facility, which includes water slides, a leisure pool, and a warm water pool, is now part of "Bay Pavilions Art + Aquatic".

=== South East Arts ===
South East Arts is the regional development organisation for arts and culture in the Bega Valley, Eurobodalla and Snowy Monaro.

== Food and produce ==
Batemans Bay is often noted for its oyster farming industry. The Clyde River, which terminates in the bay, provides a source of Sydney Rock Oysters, Pacific oysters, and Angasi oysters.

== Buildings and architecture ==
Batemans Bay has many historical buildings, sharing an insight into the areas colourful past. One of its main landmarks is an esplanade known as the Murra Murra Mia Walkway. The name means Murra Murra Mia place or plenty of fish, and the esplanade was first opened in 1983. Northcourt Arcade was erected in 1935 as a hospital and operated until the 1960s. During these years the community fought for a more updated structure and all patients were moved to the new location on Pacific Street in 1970.

=== Bridge Plaza and Village Centre ===
The Bridge Plaza

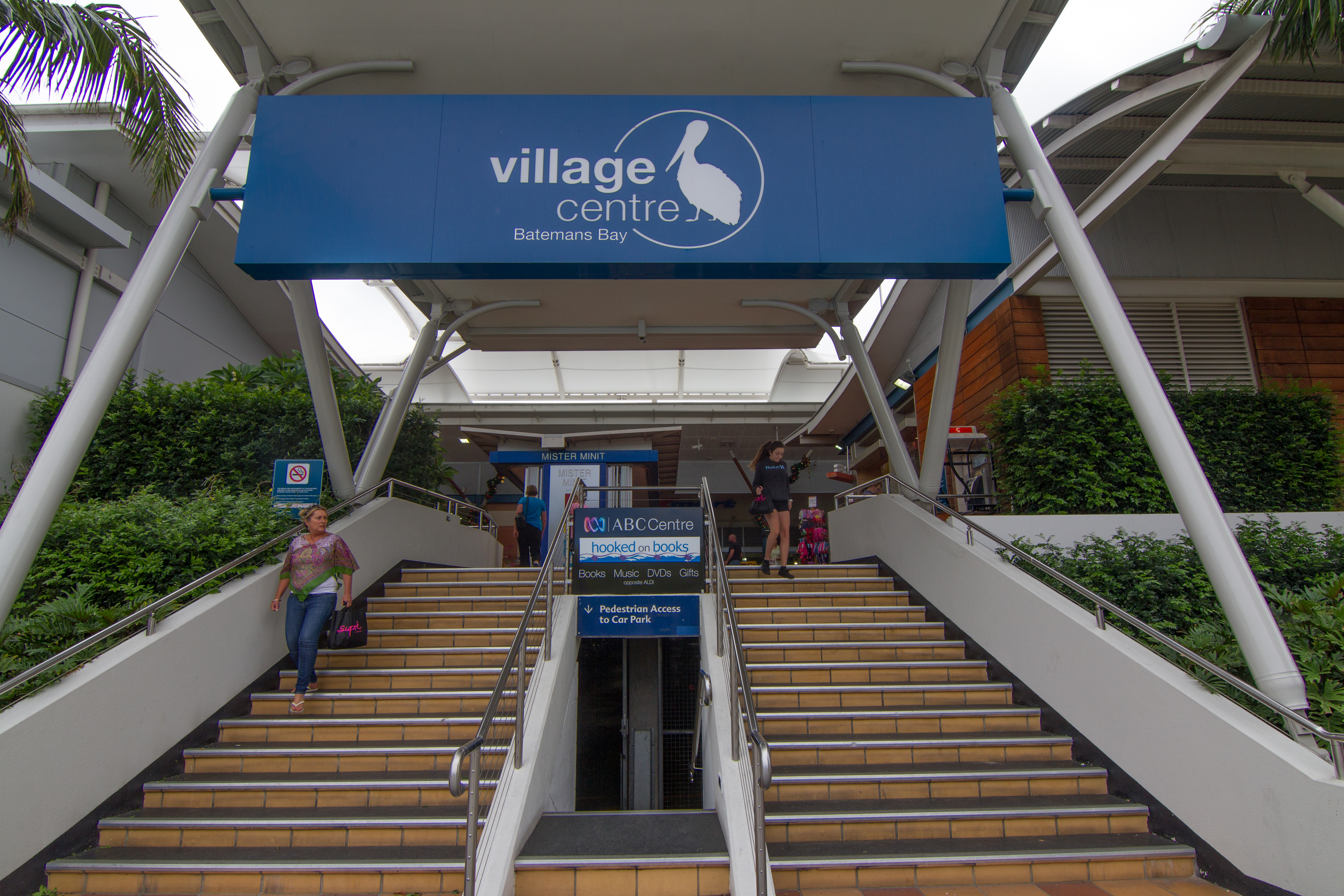
The Batemans Bay Village Centre

The Bridge Plaza and Village Centre Batemans Bay are the town's two main shopping centres. The Bridge Plaza was built in 1984, and Village Centre Batemans Bay was built in 2004. The Village Centre is anchored by Coles, Aldi and Kmart, and the Bridge Plaza is anchored by Woolworths.

== Transport ==
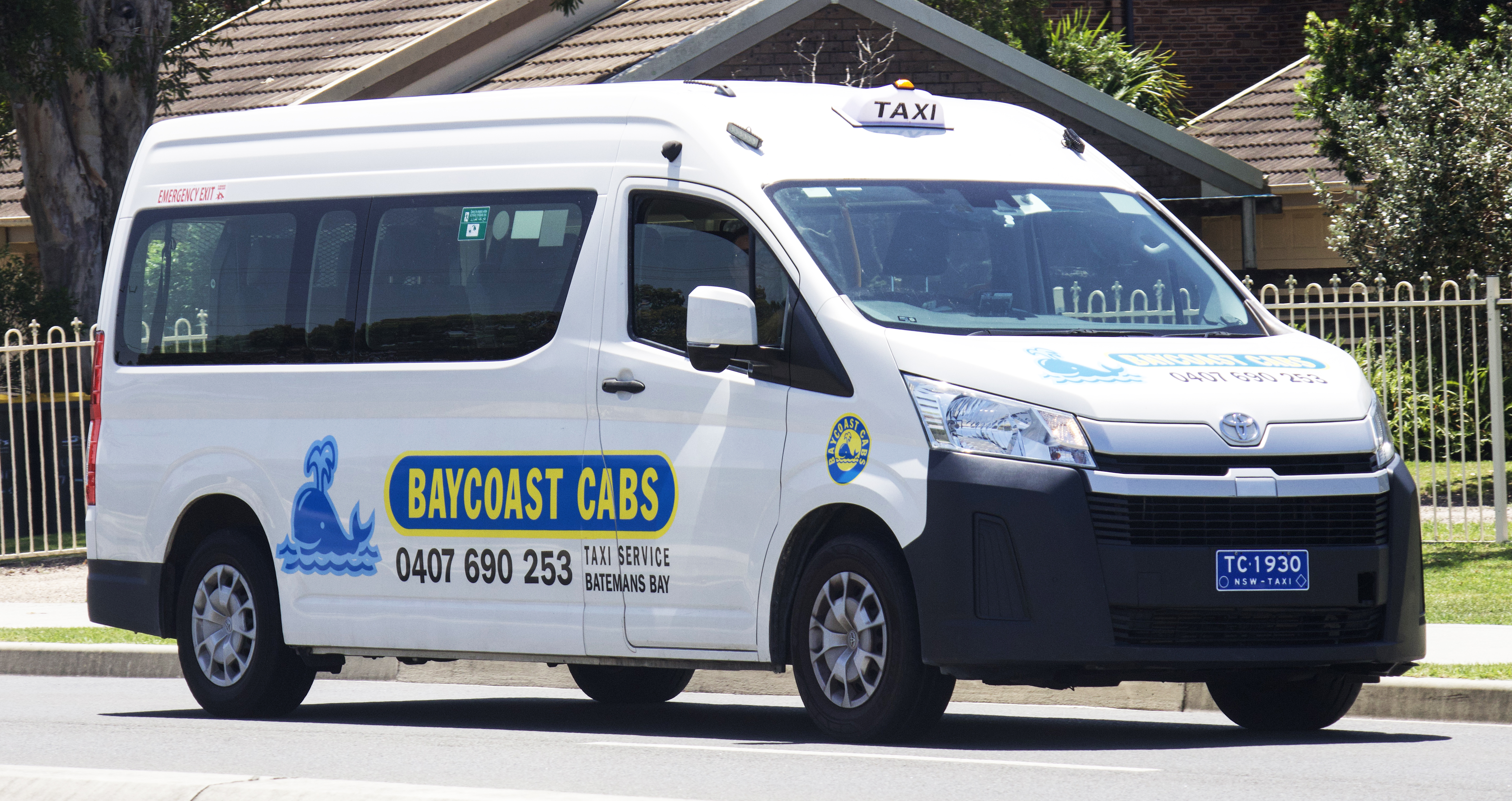
Taxicab service for Batemans Bay

=== Highways ===
Batemans Bay is located at the junction of the Princes Highway which runs down the south coast of New South Wales and the Kings Highway, which runs from Canberra to the coast.

==== Batemans Bay Bridge ====
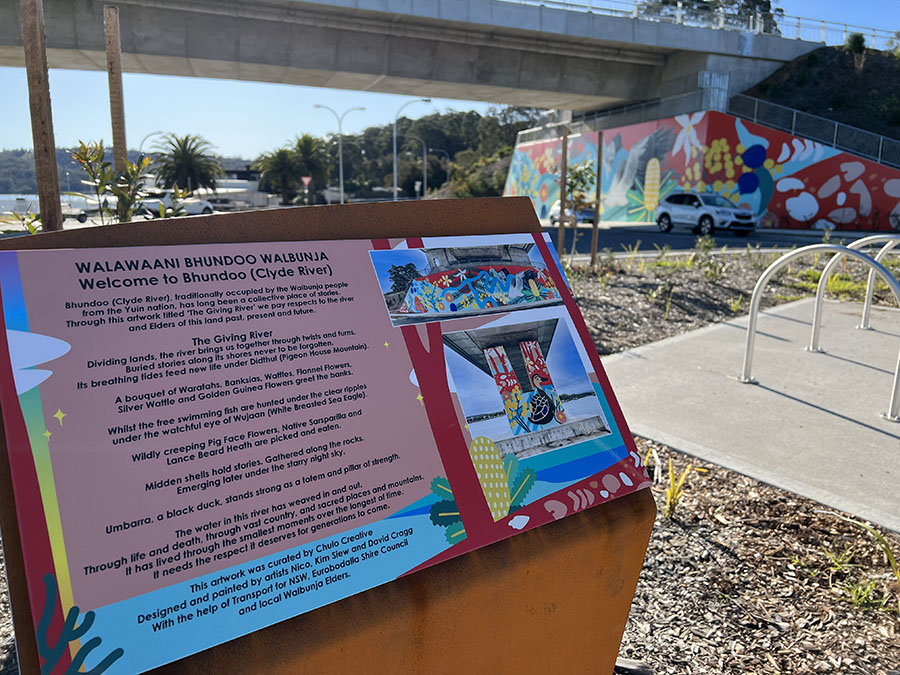
A sign and mural on the northeastern side of the present-day Batemans Bay Bridge

Batemans Bay is the only place where coastal traffic can cross the Clyde River. From 1915 to 1954 a motorised punt allowed traffic to cross the river. The former Batemans Bay Bridge was officially opened in 1956 and became a much loved landmark of the town. It was a steel vertical lift truss bridge with a maximum height of 34 metres. In 2019 work began on a replacement concrete bridge with a clearance of 12 metres. Due to this replacement project, the former steel truss bridge has been disassembled and removed, with parts of the former bridge to be turned into a sculpture on the foreshore. The new concrete bridge formally opened on 27 March 2021, with a public event for the local population that morning. The former bridge is now commemorated in public art throughout the town, including a mural on the new one, a mural on the Boatshed restaurant, and a sculpture made from its material, titled Tides.

=== Moruya Airport ===
Moruya Airport is located approximately 30 km south of the town; flights service the route between Sydney and Moruya.

== Media ==
Radio stations

- East Coast Radio 2EC (FM 105.9 – commercial)
- Power FM NSW South Coast (FM 104.3 – commercial) – POWER FM from Nowra can also be received in parts of Batemans Bay on FM 94.9.
- 2 EAR FM (Eurobodalla Access Radio FM 107.5 – community station)
- Hot Country Radio (87.6FM – commercial – country music format)
- Sky Sports Radio (FM 96.3)
- ABC South East NSW (FM 103.5) – part of the ABC Local Radio network
- Radio National (FM 105.1)
- ABC NewsRadio (FM 100.5)
- ABC Classic (FM 101.9) – also on 95.7 from the adjacent Illawarra region.
- Triple J (FM 98.9 – from the adjacent Illawarra region). A local service from Mount Wandera is planned, subject to the clearance of local television stations.

Television

Batemans Bay and the Eurobodalla region receive five free-to-air television stations (television in Australia) including two government funded networks:

The ABC, the SBS and three commercial networks:

- Seven
- Nine and
- Network 10

ABC, SBS, Seven, Nine (WIN) and Network 10 all offer digital high-definition simulcasts of their main channels.

All five networks broadcast additional channels including: 7two, 7mate, 7flix, 7Bravo, 9Go!, 9Gem, 9Life, ABC Family, ABC Entertains, ABC News, SBS2, SBS World Movies, SBS Food, 10 Drama, 10 Comedy and Nickelodeon.

Newspapers

The local newspaper for Batemans Bay and the Eurobodalla region is The Bay Post; published by Fairfax Media.

The Beagle Weekly is an independent online newspaper covering the Eurobodalla shire from South Durras to Tilba Tilba. Established in November 2016 it provides a full news service.

Daily newspapers such as The Canberra Times, the Illawarra Mercury from Wollongong, the Sydney Morning Herald, the Daily Telegraph, The Australian, The Age, Herald Sun and the Australian Financial Review are available in Batemans Bay. Some local newspapers from other NSW South Coast towns such as Bega, Nowra, Ulladulla, Moruya, Merimbula and Narooma are also available.

== Sport ==
The Batemans Bay Tigers compete in the Group 16 Rugby League competition. The club, which was founded in 1897, is the second-oldest known rugby league club in Australia, behind Rockhampton's Fitzroy-Gracemere Sharks (founded in 1886), and in fact pre-dates the sport's arrival in Australia, as the club initially played rugby union before switching to league. From 1978 until 2013, the club played in the Group 7 Rugby League competition, in which they won 5 titles (1979, 1986, 1988, 1992, 2002). In Group 16 competitions, the club has won 4 titles (1940, 1948, 1953, 1967), for a total of nine senior premierships.

The Batemans Bay Seahawks Australian rules football club (founded 1984) compete in AFL Canberra's Community Divisions.

== Climate ==
Batemans Bay experiences an oceanic climate (Köppen climate classification Cfb). The climate of Batemans Bay is moderated by the sea, with warm summers and mild sunny winters. Nights can be cold in winter, due to its somewhat inland position. Thunderstorms mostly occur between November and March, with rainfall maximums in summer. The town gets 87.3 clear days annually. The town's drier winter trend is owed to its position on the leeward side of the dividing range.

Climate data for Batemans Bay
Month	Jan	Feb	Mar	Apr	May	Jun	Jul	Aug	Sep	Oct	Nov	Dec	Year
Record high °C (°F)	45.6 (114.1)	43.2 (109.8)	40.8 (105.4)	35.0 (95.0)	27.5 (81.5)	24.5 (76.1)	24.1 (75.4)	27.7 (81.9)	36.6 (97.9)	36.9 (98.4)	41.0 (105.8)	42.1 (107.8)	45.6 (114.1)
Mean daily maximum °C (°F)	26.1 (79.0)	25.6 (78.1)	24.6 (76.3)	22.4 (72.3)	19.9 (67.8)	17.4 (63.3)	17.1 (62.8)	18.2 (64.8)	20.5 (68.9)	22.1 (71.8)	23.3 (73.9)	24.8 (76.6)	21.8 (71.2)
Mean daily minimum °C (°F)	15.8 (60.4)	16.0 (60.8)	14.1 (57.4)	10.6 (51.1)	7.1 (44.8)	5.3 (41.5)	3.7 (38.7)	4.5 (40.1)	7.1 (44.8)	9.7 (49.5)	12.2 (54.0)	14.2 (57.6)	10.0 (50.0)
Record low °C (°F)	6.6 (43.9)	7.0 (44.6)	4.4 (39.9)	1.1 (34.0)	−1.0 (30.2)	−2.0 (28.4)	−2.9 (26.8)	−2.3 (27.9)	−1.8 (28.8)	0.0 (32.0)	1.0 (33.8)	3.0 (37.4)	−2.9 (26.8)
Average rainfall mm (inches)	89.7 (3.53)	103.8 (4.09)	80.1 (3.15)	60.3 (2.37)	55.3 (2.18)	81.9 (3.22)	43.2 (1.70)	65.8 (2.59)	53.6 (2.11)	85.4 (3.36)	90.4 (3.56)	72.3 (2.85)	885.2 (34.85)
Average rainy days	11.9	11.3	10.5	7.7	7.0	7.9	6.6	6.3	8.2	9.4	11.3	11.0	109.1
Average afternoon relative humidity (%)	63	66	63	62	61	61	57	56	57	58	61	62	61
Average dew point °C (°F)	16.2 (61.2)	16.9 (62.4)	15.3 (59.5)	12.7 (54.9)	10.2 (50.4)	8.1 (46.6)	6.6 (43.9)	7.0 (44.6)	8.8 (47.8)	10.4 (50.7)	12.7 (54.9)	14.5 (58.1)	11.6 (52.9)

== Notable people ==
- Daniel Connell, comedian
- Paul Sidwell, linguist
- Bailey Sweeny, racing driver
- Kai Trewin, soccer player

== See also ==
- List of ports in Australia
