= Electoral district of Bega =

State electoral district of New South Wales, Australia

Bega New South Wales—Legislative Assembly
- Interactive map of district boundaries from the 2023 state election
- State: New South Wales
- Dates current: 1894–1920; 1988–present
- MP: Michael Holland
- Party: Labor
- Namesake: Bega
- Electors: 58,131 (2019)
- Area: 9,785.02 km^{2} (3,778.0 sq mi)
- Demographic: Rural
Electorates around Bega:
Monaro	South Coast	Pacific Ocean
Monaro	Bega	Pacific Ocean
Gippsland (VIC)	Gippsland (VIC)	Pacific Ocean

Bega is an electoral district of the Legislative Assembly in the Australian state of New South Wales. It has been represented by Michael Holland of the Labor Party since a 2022 by-election.

Bega is a regional electorate in the southeastern corner of the state on the Tasman Sea. It encompasses the entirety of Bega Valley Shire and Eurobodalla Shire. Its population centres include Bega, Tathra, Merimbula, Eden, Bemboka, Moruya, Batemans Bay and Narooma.

== History ==
In 1894, single-member electorates were introduced statewide and the two-member electorate of Eden was split into Bega and Eden–Bombala. In 1904 Eden-Bombala was abolished as a result of the 1903 New South Wales referendum which reduced the number of members of the Legislative Assembly from 125 to 90 and part of the district was absorbed by Bega. In 1920, with the introduction of proportional representation, it was absorbed into Goulburn, along with Monaro. It was recreated in 1988.

Bega has historically tended to be a safe conservative seat, although demographic change has led to the seat becoming increasingly marginal for the Liberal Party for much of the early part of the 21st century. The Liberal margin blew out in their 2011 landslide, along with many other Liberal-held country seats. Despite the Liberals suffering a 10-point swing against them in 2015, they retained it and did so again in 2019.

Following the decision of the incumbent member Andrew Constance to resign in order to run in Gilmore at the 2022 federal election, a by-election was held in 2022 which saw Labor's Michael Holland win the seat with a substantial 14-point swing. This was the first time Labor had won Bega. Holland consolidated his hold on the seat at the 2023 state election, turning Bega into a safe Labor seat in one stroke.

== Members for Bega ==
=== First incarnation (1894–1920) ===
Member	Party	Period
Thomas Rawlinson	Ind. Protectionist	1894–1895
Henry Clarke	Ind. Protectionist	1895–1898
Henry Clarke	Protectionist	1898–1901
Henry Clarke	Progressive	1901–1904
William Wood	Liberal Reform	1904–1913
William Millard	Liberal Reform	1913–1916
William Millard	Nationalist	1916–1920
=== Second incarnation (1988–present) ===
Member	Party	Period
Russell Smith	Liberal	1988–2003
Andrew Constance	Liberal	2003–2021
Michael Holland	Labor	2022–present

== Election results ==
2023 New South Wales state election: Bega
Party	Candidate	Votes	%	±%
Labor	Michael Holland	23,294	45.07	+14.48
Liberal	Russell Fitzpatrick	16,268	31.48	−17.43
Greens	Cathy Griff	4,322	8.36	−1.39
Shooters, Fishers, Farmers	Debra Abbott	3,802	7.36	+0.90
Legalise Cannabis	Greg White	2,043	3.95	+3.95
Independent	Jeffrey Hawkins	1,199	2.32	+2.32
Sustainable Australia	Karin Geiselhart	756	1.46	+1.46
Total formal votes		51,684	97.19	+0.01
Informal votes		1,495	2.81	−0.01
Turnout		53,179	88.99	−0.76
Two-party-preferred result
Labor	Michael Holland	27,835	60.40	+17.33
Liberal	Russell Fitzpatrick	18,248	39.60	−17.33
Labor gain from Liberal		Swing	+17.33	

Andrew Constance (Liberal) had won the seat at the 2019 state election, however he resigned in 2021 and Michael Holland (Labor) won the seat at the resulting by-election. At the 2023 state election, Holland retained the seat he won at the by-election.
