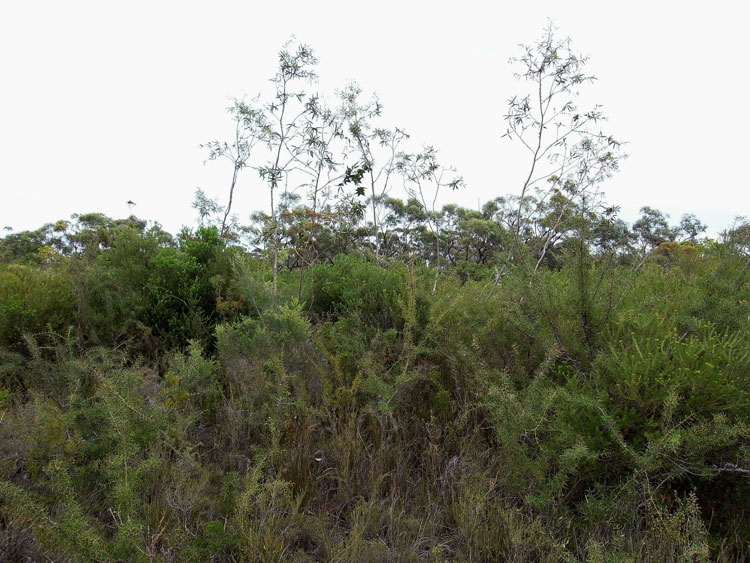
- Eucalyptus sturgissiana near Tianjara Falls

Conservation status
- Near Threatened (IUCN 3.1)

- Endangered (EPBC Act)

Scientific classification
- Kingdom: Plantae
- Clade: Tracheophytes
- Clade: Angiosperms
- Clade: Eudicots
- Clade: Rosids
- Order: Myrtales
- Family: Myrtaceae
- Genus: Eucalyptus
- Species: E. sturgissiana

Binomial name
- Eucalyptus sturgissiana L.A.S.Johnson & Blaxell

= Eucalyptus sturgissiana =

Steel box

Species of eucalyptus

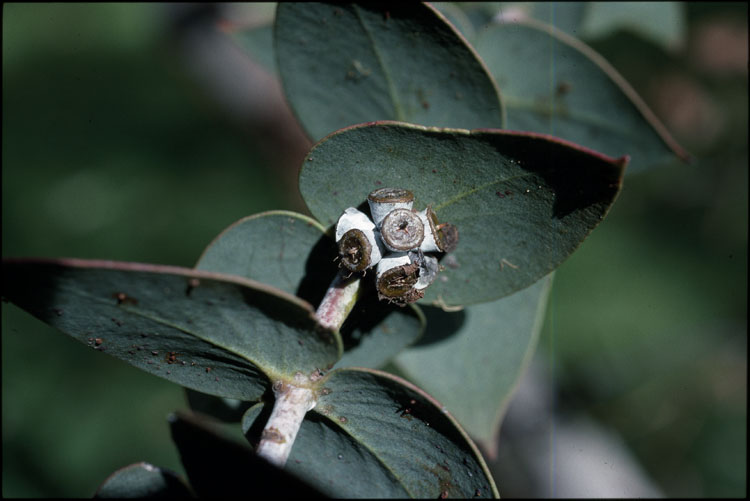
Paired leaves and immature fruit

Eucalyptus sturgissiana, commonly known as steel box or Ettrema mallee, is a species of mallee that is endemic to a small area of New South Wales. It has smooth, mottled bark, narrow lance-shaped adult leaves, often with juvenile leaves persisting in the crown, flower buds in groups of seven, white flowers and hemispherical to bell-shaped fruit.

== Description ==
Eucalyptus sturgissiana is a mallee that typically grows to a height of 5 m (16 ft) and forms a lignotuber. It has smooth, mottled greyish to brownish or pink bark that is shed in ribbons. Young plants and coppice regrowth have glaucous stems and sessile leaves that are dull green to greyish, egg-shaped to round, 50–75 mm (2.0–3.0 in) long and 30–75 mm (1.2–3.0 in) wide, arranged in opposite pairs and often persist in the crown. Adult leaves are sometimes arranged in opposite pairs, the same shade of glossy green on both sides, narrow lance-shaped, 50–100 mm (2.0–3.9 in) long and 7–12 mm (0.28–0.47 in) wide, tapering to a petiole up to 10 mm (0.39 in) long. The flower buds are arranged in leaf axils in groups of seven on an unbranched peduncle 6–12 mm (0.24–0.47 in) long, the individual buds sessile or on pedicels up to 4 mm (0.16 in) long. Mature buds are oval to spindle-shaped, 6–7 mm (0.24–0.28 in) long and 4–5 mm (0.16–0.20 in) wide with a conical operculum. The flowers are white and the fruit is a woody, hemispherical to bell-shaped capsule 3–6 mm (0.12–0.24 in) long and 5–7 mm (0.20–0.28 in) wide with the valves near rim level.

== Taxonomy and naming ==
Eucalyptus sturgessiana was first formally described in 1972 by Lawrie Johnson and Donald Blaxell in Contributions from the New South Wales National Herbarium, from specimens they collected near the Nowra to Braidwood Road in 1970. The specific epithet honours James H. Sturgiss (1890-1983) who "discovered most of the known populations" of this species.

== Distribution and habitat ==
Steel box usually grows in small, pure stands on sandstone plateaus, mostly in the Morton National Park.

== Conservation status ==
As of March 2025, Eucalyptus paliformis has been listed as "critically endangered" under the Australian Government Environment Protection and Biodiversity Conservation Act 1999. The IUCN Red List assesses the species as Near Threatened.
