= Coolumburra =

- Town
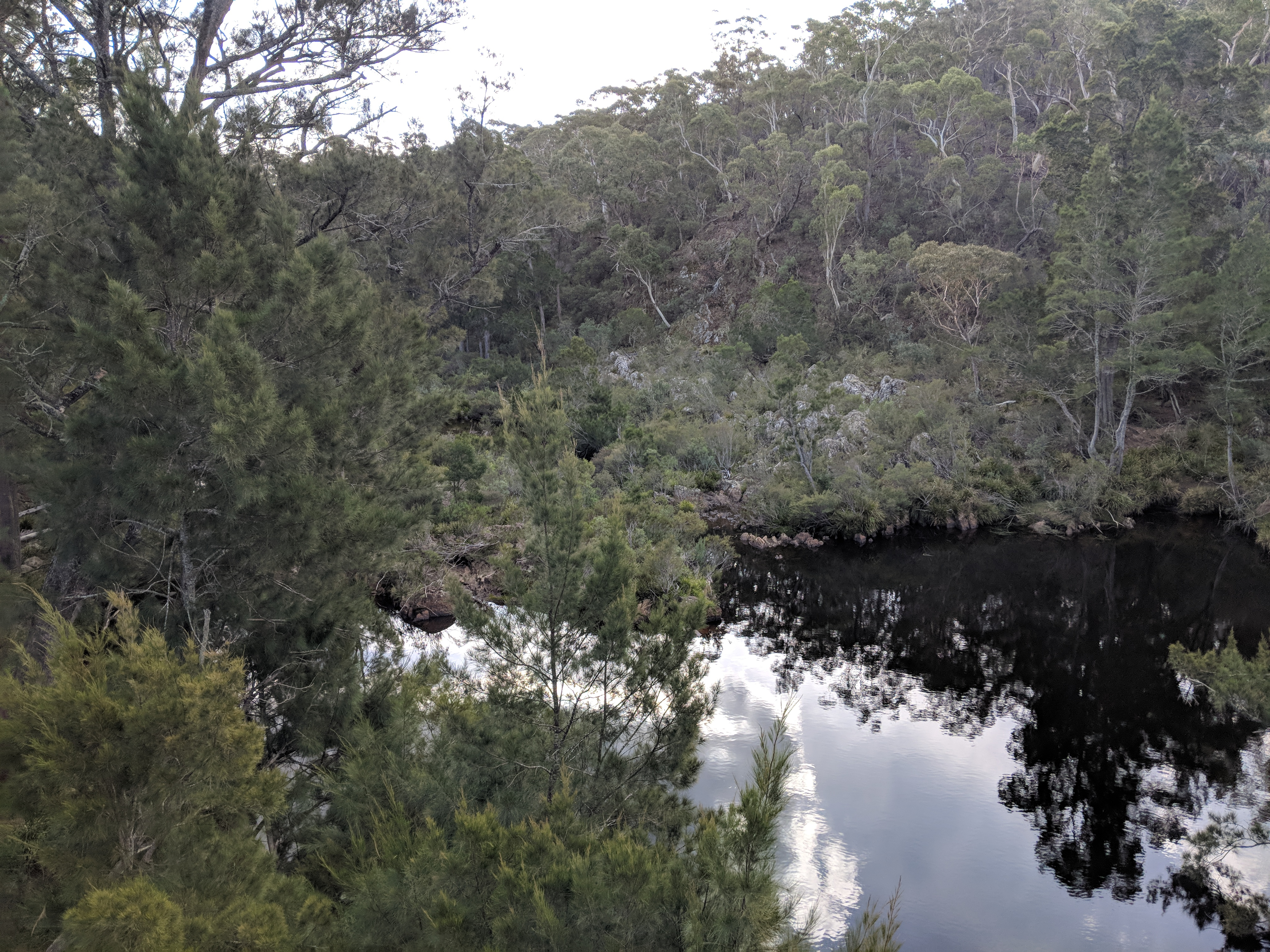
- Endrick river at Nerriga Road bridge looking north into Coolumburra

- Coordinates: 35°02′50″S 150°06′25″E
- Country: Australia
- State: New South Wales
- Region: South Coast
- LGA: City of Shoalhaven
- Location: 67 km (42 mi) SW of Nowra; 133 km (83 mi) E of Canberra; 90 km (56 mi) SE of Goulburn; 234 km (145 mi) SW of Sydney

Government
  - State electorate: Kiama
  - Federal division: Gilmore
- Elevation: 575 m (1,886 ft)

Population
  - Total: 0 (2016 census)
- Postcode: 2622
- County: St Vincent
- Parish: Coolumburra
Localities around Coolumburra
Windellama	Bulee	St George
Nerriga	Coolumburra	St George
Nerriga	Nerriga	Sassafras

Coolumburra is a locality in the City of Shoalhaven in New South Wales, Australia. It lies on the Braidwood Road on the Endrick River between Nowra and Nerriga. This road continues southwest to Braidwood, but this involves a section of unsealed road. The sealed Oallen Ford Road branches off south of Nerriga, which connects via various sealed roads to Canberra and Goulburn. Coolumburra is heavily forested and part lies within the Morton National Park. At the 2016 census, it had a population of none.
