= Bellemore =

Bellemore is a surname. Notable people with the surname include:

- Bob Bellemore (born 1940), American ice hockey goaltending coach
- Brett Bellemore (born 1988), Canadian ice hockey player

== See also ==
- Bellemare
- Bellmore (disambiguation)
