= Belmore =

Belmore may refer to:

== People ==
- Bertha Belmore (1882–1953), British stage and film actress
- Lionel Belmore (1867–1953), English actor and film director
- Rebecca Belmore (born 1960), Canadian Anishinaabekwe artist
- Belmore Browne (1880–1954), American artist and explorer

== Places ==
- Belmore Falls, a waterfall in southern New South Wales, Australia
- Belmore, New South Wales, a suburb of Sydney, New South Wales, Australia
  - Belmore Sports Ground, a football field in Belmore, Sydney, New South Wales, Australia
- Belmore, Ohio, a town in Ohio, United States
- Belmore, Washington, an unincorporated community
- Belmore, Ontario, an area of Huron County, Ontario, Canada
- Belmore Park, a park in central Sydney, New South Wales, Australia
- Belmore (1965-1978 ward), a former electoral ward of Hillingdon London Borough Council that existed from 1965 to 1978
- Belmore (ward), an electoral ward of Hillingdon London Borough Council that was created in 2022

== Other uses ==
- Belmore Mountain, a hill in County Fermanagh, Northern Ireland, United Kingdom
- Earl Belmore, a title in the Irish peerage

== See also ==
- Bellmore (disambiguation)
