= Tianjara =

- Town
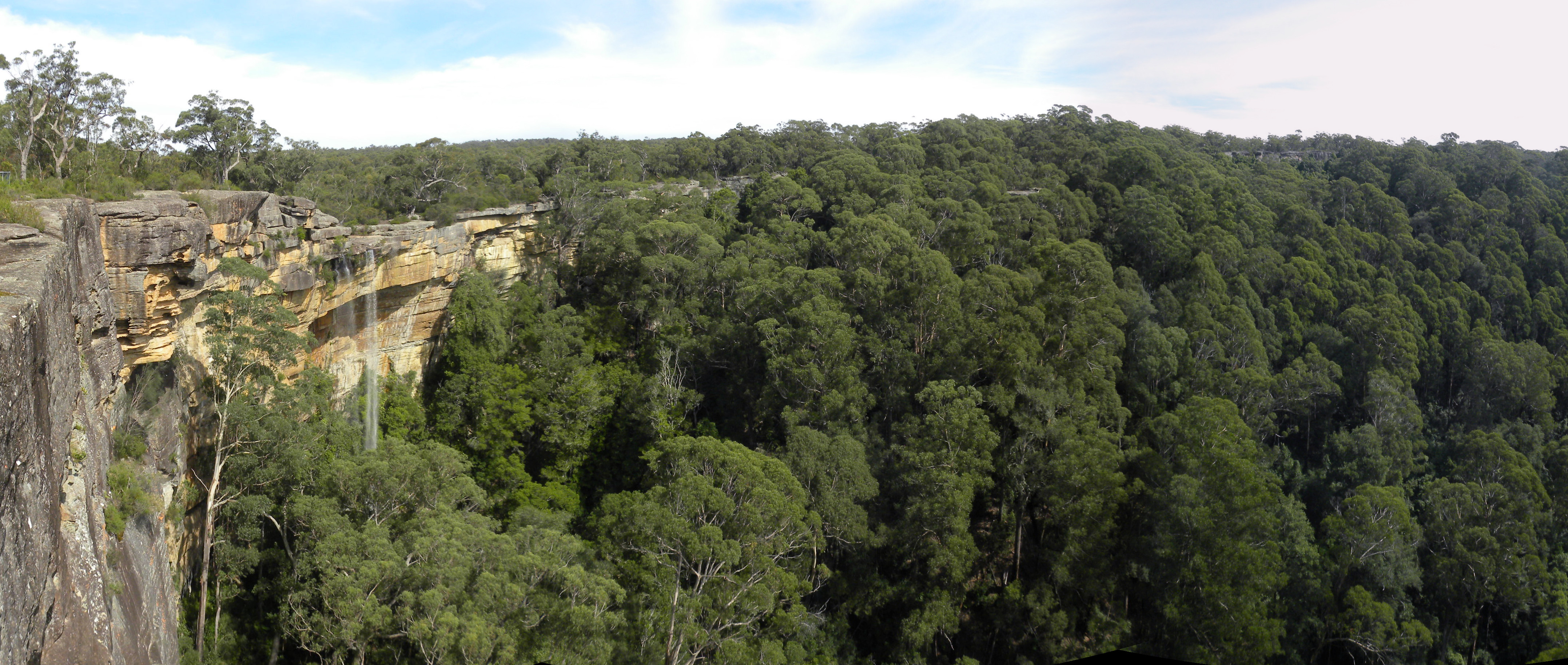
- Tianjara Falls

- Coordinates: 35°08′12″S 150°18′10″E
- Country: Australia
- State: New South Wales
- Region: South Coast
- LGA: City of Shoalhaven
- Location: 47 km (29 mi) SW of Nowra; 154 km (96 mi) E of Canberra; 102 km (63 mi) SE of Goulburn; 209 km (130 mi) SSW of Sydney

Government
  - State electorate: South Coast
  - Federal division: Gilmore
- Elevation: 505 m (1,657 ft)

Population
  - Total: 7 (SAL 2021)
- Postcode: 2622
- County: St Vincent
- Parish: Tianjara
Localities around Tianjara
Sassafras	Boolijah	Jerrawangala
Sassafras	Tianjara	Twelve Mile Peg
Endrick	Endrick	Pointer Mountain

Tianjara is a locality in the City of Shoalhaven in New South Wales, Australia. It lies generally south of the Braidwood Road between Nowra and Nerriga. It is about 47 kilometres southwest of Nowra. Tianjara is fairly rugged sandstone country and largely consists of forest. Most of it lies within the Morton National Park or state forests.

Tianjara Falls is located in its north just north of the Braidwood Road, but is usually dry except after significant rain. The falls are best seen from a viewpoint accessible from Braidwood Road, with a viewing platform located just on the eastern flank of the canyon. The ridge surrounding the falls was heavily burnt in the Australian bushfires of the summer 2019–2020.

Mount Tianjara lies in the far south, with an elevation of 768 metres (2,520 ft) above sea level.

After 'The Wool Road' (now Braidwood Road) was built, there was to be a township near to Tianjara Falls. It was first surveyed in 1841 and again in 1856 but never eventuated. At the 2016 census, Tianjara had a population of none.
