= Hibbertia pilifera =

Scientific classification
- Kingdom: Plantae
- Clade: Tracheophytes
- Clade: Angiosperms
- Clade: Eudicots
- Order: Dilleniales
- Family: Dilleniaceae
- Genus: Hibbertia
- Species: H. pilifera

Binomial name
- Hibbertia pilifera Toelken

Species of plant

Hibbertia pilifera is a species of flowering plant in the family Dilleniaceae and is endemic to New South Wales. It is a small, spreading to low-lying shrub with linear to oblong leaves and yellow flowers arranged singly on the ends of branchlets, with three to five stamens in a single cluster on one side of two carpels.

== Description ==
Hibbertia pilifera is a spreading to low-lying shrub that typically grows to a height of up to 15 cm (5.9 in) and has wiry branches and moderately hairy young foliage. The leaves are linear to oblong, 5.0–7.5 mm (0.20–0.30 in) long and 0.6–0.8 mm (0.024–0.031 in) wide on a petiole 1.5–3.0 mm (0.059–0.118 in) long. The flowers are arranged singly on the ends of branchlets and short side shoots, each flower on a thread-like peduncle 5–8 mm (0.20–0.31 in) long with linear bracts 1.2–1.5 mm (0.047–0.059 in) long at the base. The five sepals are joined at the base, the outer sepal lobes 4.2–4.4 mm (0.17–0.17 in) long and the inner lobes 4.8–5.0 mm (0.19–0.20 in) long. The five petals are broadly egg-shaped with the narrower end towards the base, yellow, 5.6–6.4 mm (0.22–0.25 in) long and there are three to five stamens arranged in a bundle on one side of the two carpels, each carpel with four ovules. Flowering mainly occurs from September to November.

== Taxonomy ==
Hibbertia pilifera was first formally described in 2012 by Hellmut R. Toelken in the Journal of the Adelaide Botanic Gardens from specimens collected in 1966 in Bungonia State Recreation Area. The specific epithet (pilifera) means "hair-bearing".

== Distribution and habitat ==
This hibbertia grows in open woodland in scattered locations from Scone, New South Wales to Bungonia State Recreation Area in central New South Wales.

== See also ==
- List of Hibbertia species
