= Sensationalism =

Type of editorial tactic used in mass media

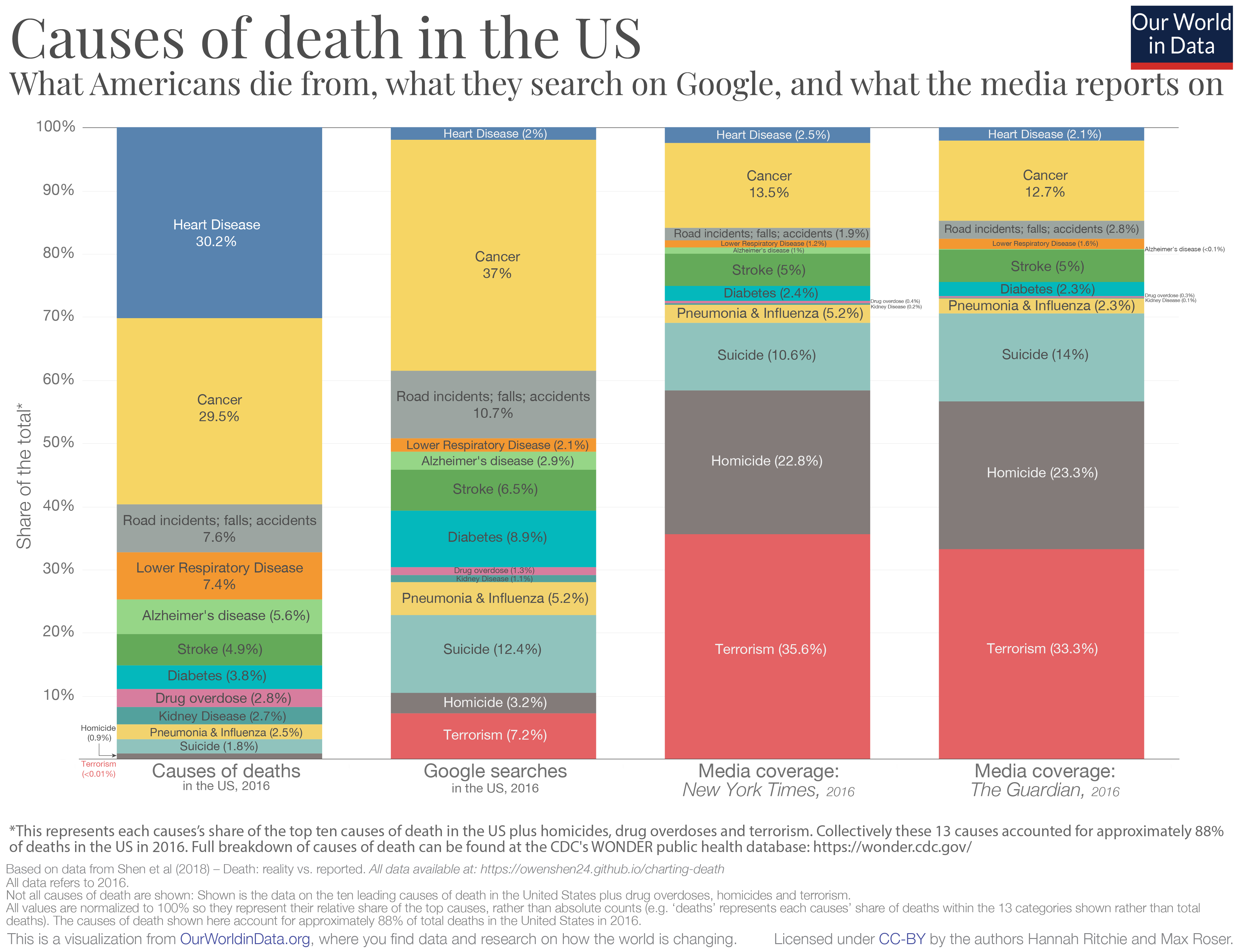
Causes of death in the US vs. media coverage. The percentage of media attention for terrorism, homicide, or suicide is much greater than the percentage of deaths caused by it. There is a null in numerical data concerning deaths per day on various bars in media charts.

In journalism and mass media, sensationalism is a type of editorial tactic. Events and topics in news stories are selected and worded to excite the greatest number of readers and viewers. This style of news reporting encourages biased or emotionally loaded impressions of events rather than journalistic objectivity. Sensationalism may rely on reports about generally insignificant matters and portray them as a major influence on society, or biased presentations of newsworthy topics, in a trivial or tabloid manner, contrary to general assumptions of professional journalistic standards.

Some tactics include appealing to emotions, seeking and stoking controversy, and generally prioritizing attention. Trivial information and events are sometimes misrepresented and exaggerated as important or significant, and often include stories about the actions of individuals and small groups of people, the content of which is often insignificant and irrelevant to the macro-level day-to-day events occurring globally.

== History ==
In A History of News, Mitchell Stephens notes sensationalism can be found in the Ancient Roman gazette Acta Diurna, where official notices and announcements were presented daily on public message boards, the perceived content of which spread with enthusiasm in illiterate societies. Sensationalism was used in books of the 16th and 17th century, to teach moral lessons. According to Stephens, sensationalism brought the news to a new audience when it became aimed at the lower social class, who had less of a need to accurately understand politics and the economy, to occupy them in other matters. Through sensationalism, he claims that the audience was further educated and encouraged to take more interest in the news.

The more modern forms of sensationalism developed in the course of the 19th century in parallel with the expansion of print culture in industrialized nations. A genre of British literature, "sensation novels", became in the 1860s an example of how the publishing industry could capitalize on surprising narrative to market serialized fiction in periodicals. The attention-grasping rhetorical techniques found in sensation fiction were also employed in articles on science, modern technology, finance, and in historical accounts of contemporary events. Sensationalism in 19th century could be found in popular culture, literature, performance, art history, theory, pre-cinema, and early cinema.

In the Soviet Union, strong censorship resulted in only "positive occurrences" being reported on, with the news looking significantly different than in the West. In the United States, modern sensationalism in the news increased after the repeal of the Fairness Doctrine in 1987 by the Federal Communications Commission, which required broadcasters when showing one partisan view to show another, and in order to be a broadcaster one needed a license. In Western Europe, sensationalism in the news also increased after the liberalization of television networks in the late 1980s and early 1990s.

== Underlying causes ==
=== Role of profit ===
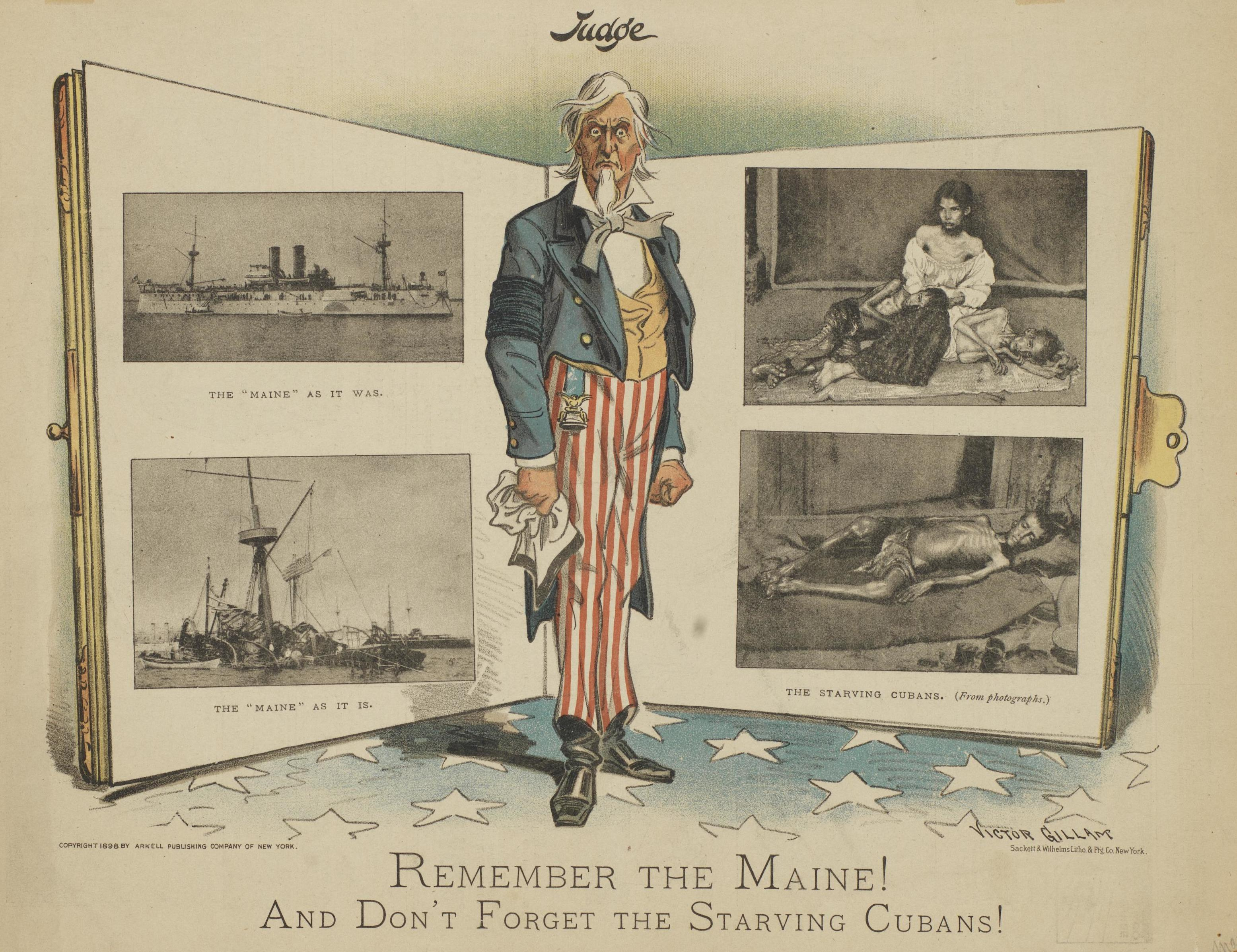
American cartoon published in 1898, Remember the Maine! And Don't Forget the Starving Cubans! Such sensationalist cartoons were used to support American intervention in the Cuban War of Independence.

In the late 1800s, falling costs in paper production and rising revenues in advertising in the U.S. led to a drastic rise in newspapers' circulation, which attracted the growing audiences that advertisers desired. One presumed goal of sensational reporting is to increase or sustain viewership or readership, from which media outlets can price their advertising higher to increase their profits based on higher numbers of viewers and/or readers. Sometimes this can lead to a lesser focus on objective journalism in favor of a profit motive, in which editorial choices are based upon sensational stories and presentations to increase advertising revenue.

Advertisers tend to have a preference for their products or services to be reported positively in mass media, which can contribute to bias in news reporting in favor of media outlets protecting their profits and revenues, rather than reporting objectively about stated products and services. The more dependent news organizations are on advertising revenue, the greater number of sensationalist news stories are produced, argues Paul Hendriks Vettehen and Mariska Kleemans in Proving the Obvious? What Sensationalism Contributes to the Time Spent on News Video.

The Watergate scandal has been credited by some with creating distrust in government and opening the door for a new business tactic for the media that resulted in the spread of negative, dishonest and misleading news coverage of American politics; such examples include the labeling of a large number of political scandals, regardless of their importance, with the suffix "-gate".

Sensationalism has been blamed for the infotainment style of many news programs on radio and television. According to sociologist John Thompson, the debate of sensationalism used in the mass medium of broadcasting is based on a misunderstanding of its audience, especially the television audience. Thompson explains that the term "mass" (which is connected to broadcasting) suggests a "vast audience of many thousands, even millions of passive individuals". Television news is restricted to showing the scenes of crimes rather than the crime itself because of the unpredictability of events, whereas newspaper writers can always recall what they did not witness.

On web-based platforms such as Facebook, Google, and YouTube their respective algorithms are used to maximize advertising revenue by attracting and keeping the attention of users. This business model results in sensationalist content often being prioritized as algorithms often predict that it will get the highest amount of engagement.

=== Novelty and unusualness ===
When trying to cater to younger audiences, news stories that are more sensational and unusual will often drown out stories that may be considered less exciting but more significant. In Mass Media and American Politics, Doris A. Graber and Johanna Dunaway give the example of how the Chicago Sun Times will give 20 times more space to sports in comparison to the state government. Covering singular news stories that are considered dramatic can lead to other stories being obscured.

=== Time constraints ===
In a 24-hour news cycle, there will be instances where there is little news happening along with no developments in stories that are considered important and because of this they will need to fill the time by sharing a story that is less so about actual news and more intended to keep the audience's attention.

=== Competition ===
In news markets where there is more competition, the more likely a certain news outlet will be to produce sensationalist stories as a way to compete with other outlets, creating a snowball effect.

== Features ==
=== Language ===
One feature of sensationalistic news is the intensification of language used in the article. The most common use of sensationalist language is in the headlines of news articles.

=== Teaser ===
David M. Berube considers the use of headlines to be the primary way sensationalism manifests in media, by creating teasers that use emotion to try and capture the attention of an audience even if the headline exaggerates or is otherwise misleading. In YouTube videos, the thumbnail image of a video can similarly mislead audiences.

=== Fearmongering ===
The use of fearmongering is sometimes used by media outlets as well to gain attention to their content.

== Impacts ==
Zeynep Tufecki argues that it's easier to shift the "Overton window" online thanks to algorithms replacing traditional gatekeepers of journalism. C. P. Chandrasekhar argues that news outlets are at a higher risk of releasing content that is false because of how quickly news is circulated through the internet in order to capitalize on those views and clicks for profit. Joe Sommerlad criticized algorithms used by Google News for not promoting more trustworthy sources.

=== Distortion of events ===
==== Overrepresentation of crime ====
One of the most prominent and most covered news topics is crime being represented disproportionately to other social problems. Most often what is covered is the "accounts of the commission of crime and law-enforcement activities." A lesser amount but still significant level is given to court proceedings and the least related to corrections giving the public a limited understand of the criminal justice system and the social contexts of crime.

==== Exaggeration of science news ====
With science news, the press release may be relied upon heavily, which can exaggerate or spin the findings. One theory for this practice, in addition to time constraints, is that journalists do not access academic articles as much since many are behind paywalls. One example of sensationalism in science news was the fraudulent Lancet MMR vaccine-autism study, published in 1998 by Andrew Wakefield in The Lancet, showing an unfounded link between MMR vaccines and autism, with it reaching the news media via press releases and a news conference getting widespread coverage despite the publication being flawed and the article later being debunked and retracted.

=== Political polarization and democratic backsliding ===
Political polarization and democratic backsliding can be exacerbated by the media environment and its incentives towards sensationalism. Algorithms that elevate sensational and inflammatory content across a range of platforms including social media, Google, and others have received criticism as fueling division in society. This extends beyond sorting people into echo chambers and filter bubbles to include radicalization by showing more extreme content in order to boost engagement.

== Responses to sensationalism ==
Fact-checking websites, media literacy, better content moderation on social media, and legislation have been pursued to reduce the negative impacts of algorithms and sensational media. When American public television news came about in the mid-20th century it came about in part in response to the commercial news stations having sensationalized news prioritized above that of "serious reporting". Some have argued that different algorithms and platform incentives are needed to reduce modern sensationalism both online and among politicians reacting to those online incentives. Andrew Leonard describes Pol.is as one possible solution to the sensationalism of traditional discourse on social media that has damaged democracies, citing the use of its algorithm to instead prioritize finding consensus.

== See also ==
- Agnotology, the study of culturally-induced ignorance or doubt
- Attention economy
- Clickbait
- Exploitation film
- Infotainment
- Junk food news
- Media circus
- Media manipulation
- Protest paradigm
- Propaganda model, in mass media
- Salience (neuroscience)
- Sound bite
- Spreadability
- Tuchman's Law
