= E. Gallienne Robin =

- Born: 15 January 1861; Bailiwick of Guernsey
- Died: 21 September 1938; King's Lynn
- Occupation: Writer

Ellen Mary Robin (15 January 1861 – 21 September 1938) was a British–Jèrriais writer who published under the name E. Gallienne Robin.

Robin was born on 15 January 1861, on Guernsey, the daughter of Nicolas Robin, a grocer, and Rachel Elizabeth Gallienne Robin. She worked as a governess on Guernsey and a teacher in Norwich, Torquay, Dorking, and Kent in England.

Robin's fiction was set in the Channel Islands or featured people from the islands. Her Christine, A Guernsey Girl (1912) is about a woman who runs an eating house and engages in blackmail.

E. Gallienne Robin died on 21 September 1938 in King's Lynn.

== Bibliography ==
1. At the Leap of San Juan: A Sark Story. 1 vol. London: Charles H. Kelly, 1898.
2. Jeanette of Jersey. 1 vol. London: Charles H. Kelly, 1900.
3. The Haunted House at Pleinmont. 1907.
4. Where Deep Seas Moan. Guernsey: Frederick Clarke, 1907.
5. Jacquine of the Hut: A Sark Story. 1911. Reprinted as Jacquine of the Hut: A Romance of the Channel Islands. G. P. Putnam's Sons, 1912.
6. Christine, A Guernsey Girl. London: Hurst and Blackett, 1912.
7. Luce: The Story of a Mother. London: Hurst and Blackett, 1912.
8. Perilous Seas. London: R. & T. Washbourne, 1914.
9. Golden Lights. London: R. & T. Washbourne, 1915.
10. Dreaming Spires and Windswept Crags. London: Burns Oates, 1922.
11. Philippe: a Story of the Channel Islands. 1934. J. T. Bigwood Ltd., Jersey;
12. A Sark Girl (n.d.)
13. A Fair Maid of Sark (n.d.)
