= Sassafras, New South Wales =

Sassafras
- Town
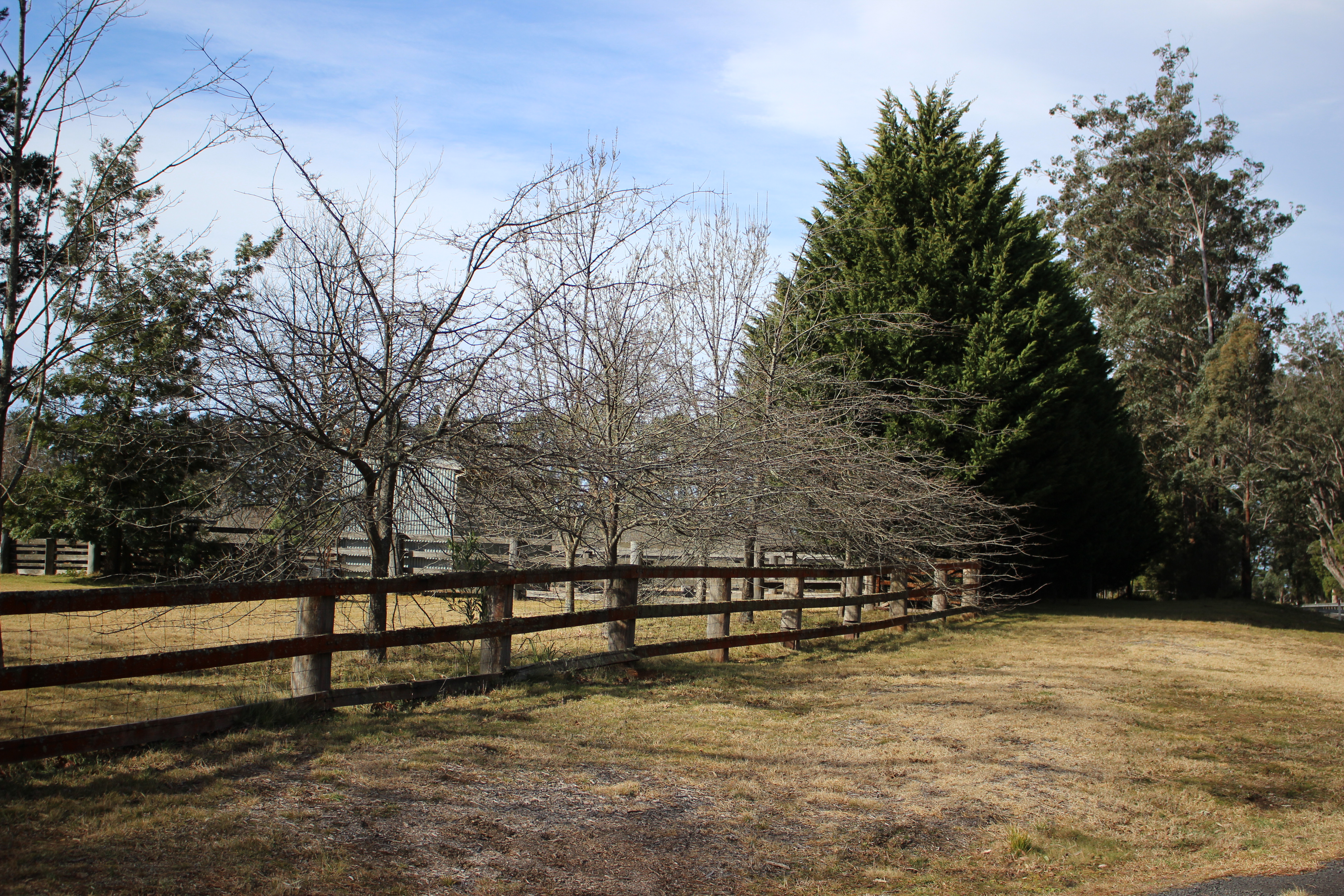
- Sassafras

- Coordinates: 35°04′57″S 150°15′02″E
- Country: Australia
- State: New South Wales
- Region: South Coast
- LGA: City of Shoalhaven
- Location: 219 km (136 mi) S of Sydney; 50 km (31 mi) SW of Nowra; 143 km (89 mi) E of Canberra; 95 km (59 mi) SE of Goulburn

Government
  - State electorates: Kiama; South Coast
  - Federal division: Gilmore
- Elevation: 775 m (2,543 ft)

Population
  - Total: 18 (SAL 2021)
- Postcode: 2622
- County: St Vincent
- Parish: Sassafras
Localities around Sassafras
Coolumburra	St George	Boolijah
Nerriga	Sassafras	Boolijah
Nerriga	Morton National Park	Tianjara

Sassafras (/sæsəfræs/) is a locality in the City of Shoalhaven in New South Wales, Australia. It lies on the Braidwood Road (which was originally built as the Wool Road), where it passes over the coastal escarpment on the road between Nowra and Nerriga. This road continues southwest to Braidwood, but this involves a section of unsealed road. (Now sealed between Nowra and Nerriga and further). The sealed Oallen Ford Road branches off south of Nerriga, which connects via various sealed roads to Canberra and Goulburn. Sassafras is a small community of orchards in an area of extensive national parks. At the 2016 census, it had a population of 31.
