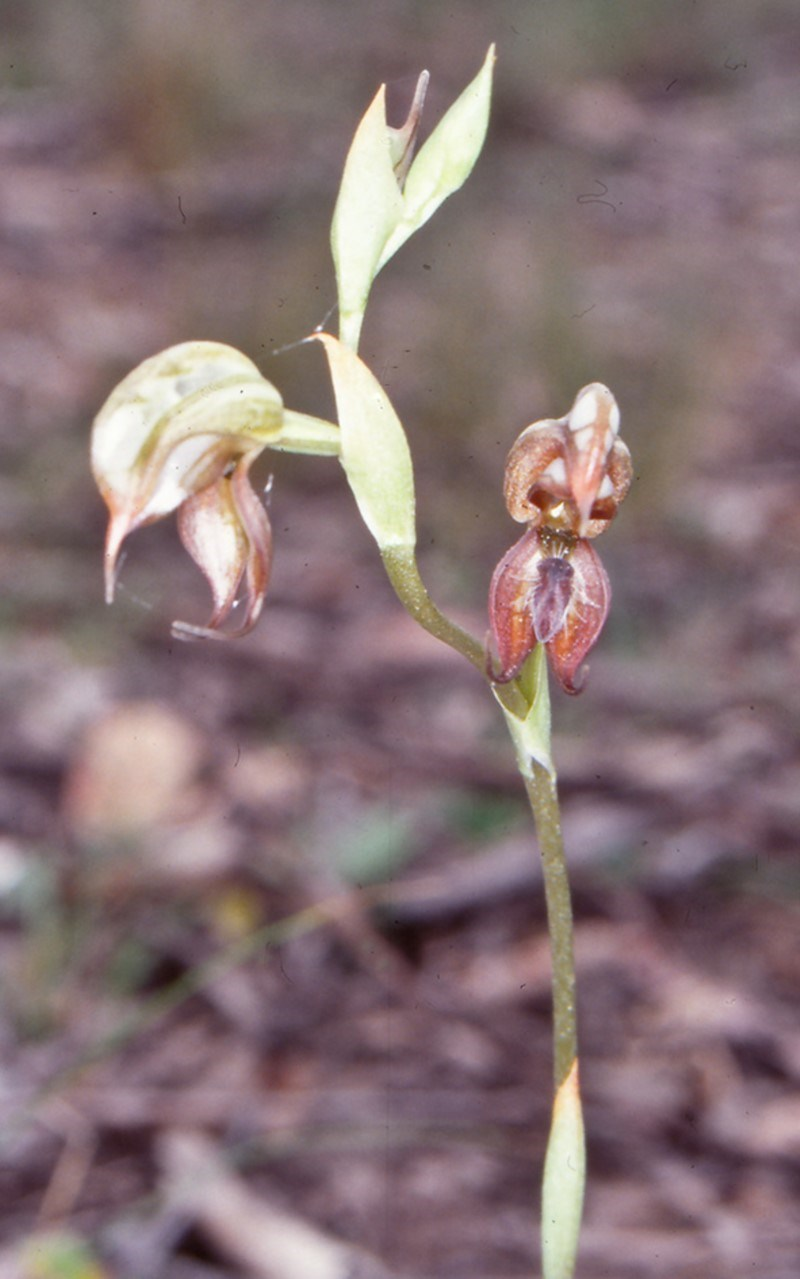

Scientific classification
- Kingdom: Plantae
- Clade: Tracheophytes
- Clade: Angiosperms
- Clade: Monocots
- Order: Asparagales
- Family: Orchidaceae
- Subfamily: Orchidoideae
- Tribe: Cranichideae
- Genus: Pterostylis
- Species: P. calceolus

Binomial name
- Pterostylis calceolus M.A.Clem.

Synonyms
- Oligochaetochilus calceolus (M.A.Clem.) Szlach.

= Pterostylis calceolus =

Bungonia rustyhood

Species of orchid

Pterostylis calceolus, commonly known as Bungonia rustyhood, is a plant in the orchid family Orchidaceae and is endemic to New South Wales. It has a rosette of overlapping leaves and between two and seven reddish-brown flowers with transparent "windows" and a fleshy brown, insect-like labellum. It is only known from near Bungonia.

== Description ==
Pterostylis calceolus, is a terrestrial, perennial, deciduous, herb with an underground tuber and a rosette of between four and six egg-shaped leaves, 15–30 mm (0.6–1 in) long and 8–12 mm (0.3–0.5 in) wide. Flowering plants have between two and seven reddish-brown flowers with transparent sections, each flower 19–22 mm (0.7–0.9 in) long, 5–7 mm (0.2–0.3 in) wide. The flowers are borne on a flowering spike 100–200 mm (4–8 in) tall with between two and four stem leaves wrapped around it. The dorsal sepal and petals form a hood or "galea" over the column with the dorsal sepal having a downturned, thread-like point 4–5 mm (0.2–0.2 in) long. The lateral sepals are 6–7 mm (0.2–0.3 in) long, 5–6 mm (0.2–0.2 in) wide, turn downwards and joined for about half their length. The lateral sepals are dished and suddenly narrow to thread-like tips 5–7 mm (0.2–0.3 in) long which curve forwards with hooked ends. The labellum is brown, fleshy, insect-like, about 5 mm (0.2 in) long, 2 mm (0.08 in) wide and egg-shaped with short bristles on the "head" end and eight to ten pairs of longer bristles on the "body". Flowering occurs from October to November.

== Taxonomy and naming ==
Pterostylis calceolus was first formally described in 1989 by Mark Clements from a specimen collected in Bungonia Gorge and the description was published in Australian Orchid Research. The specific epithet (calceolus) refers to the outline of the labellum which resembles a slipper or shoe of the type worn in the middle-ages.

== Distribution and habitat ==
Bungonia rustyhood is only known from the Bungonia district where it grows in forest and woodland.
