= Nerriga, New South Wales =

Nerriga
- Town
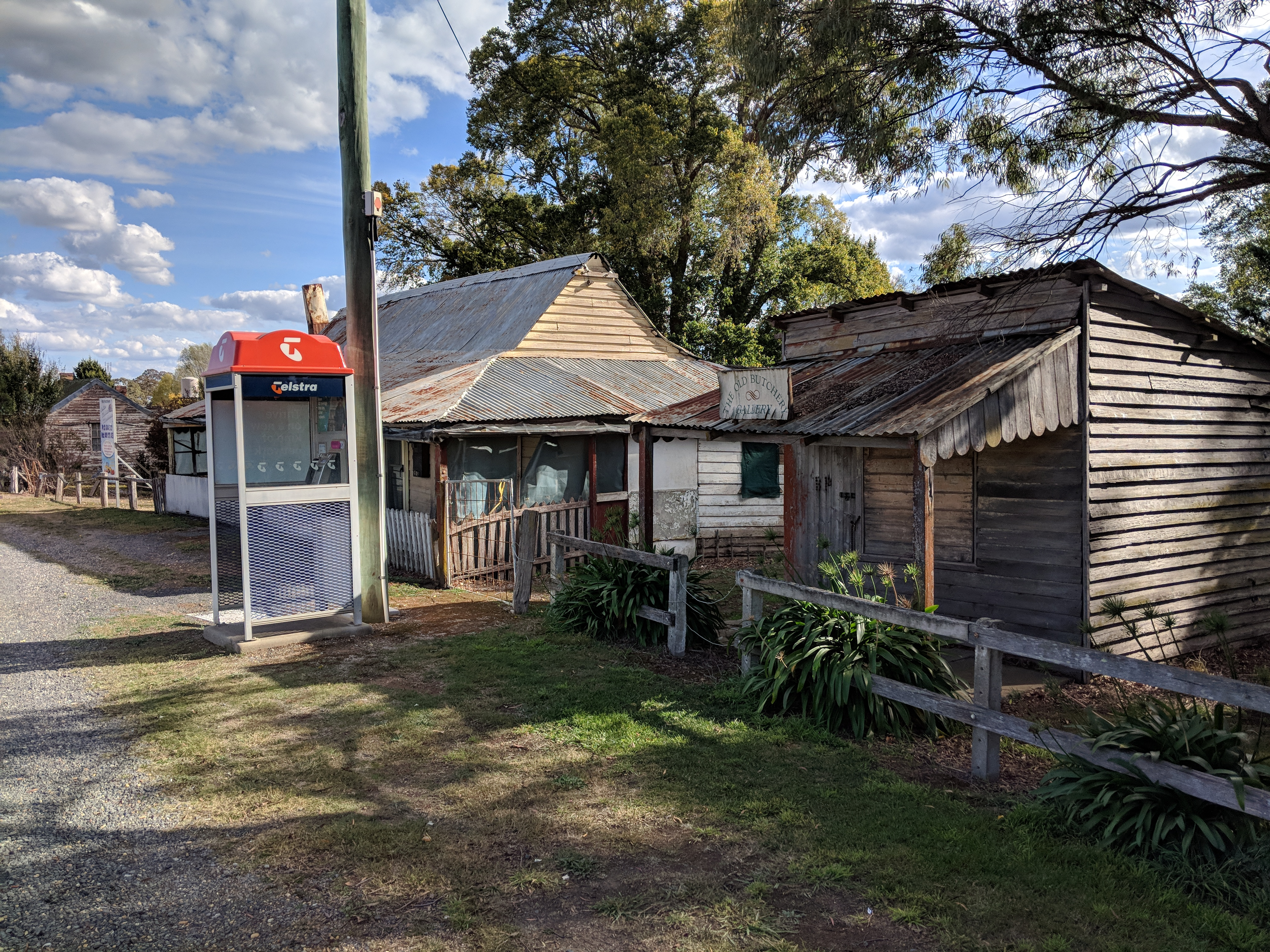
- Old butcher shop and house

- Coordinates: 35°07′S 150°05′E
- Country: Australia
- State: New South Wales
- Region: Southern Tablelands
- LGA: Queanbeyan-Palerang Regional Council
- Location: 230 km (140 mi) SSW of Sydney; 70 km (43 mi) SW of Nowra; 124 km (77 mi) E of Canberra; 76 km (47 mi) SE of Goulburn

Government
  - State electorate: Monaro
  - Federal division: Eden-Monaro
- Elevation: 630 m (2,070 ft)

Population
  - Total: 77 (SAL 2021)
- Postcode: 2622
- County: St Vincent
- Parish: Meangora
Localities around Nerriga
Windellama	Coolumburra	Coolumburra
Oallen	Nerriga	Sassafras
Oallen	Corang	Endrick

Nerriga (/nɛrəɡə/) is a small village in the Southern Tablelands of New South Wales, Australia in Queanbeyan-Palerang Regional Council. It is situated at the edge of Morton National Park, on the Braidwood - Nowra road. The population of Nerriga and the surrounding localities at the 2016 census was 72.

== History ==
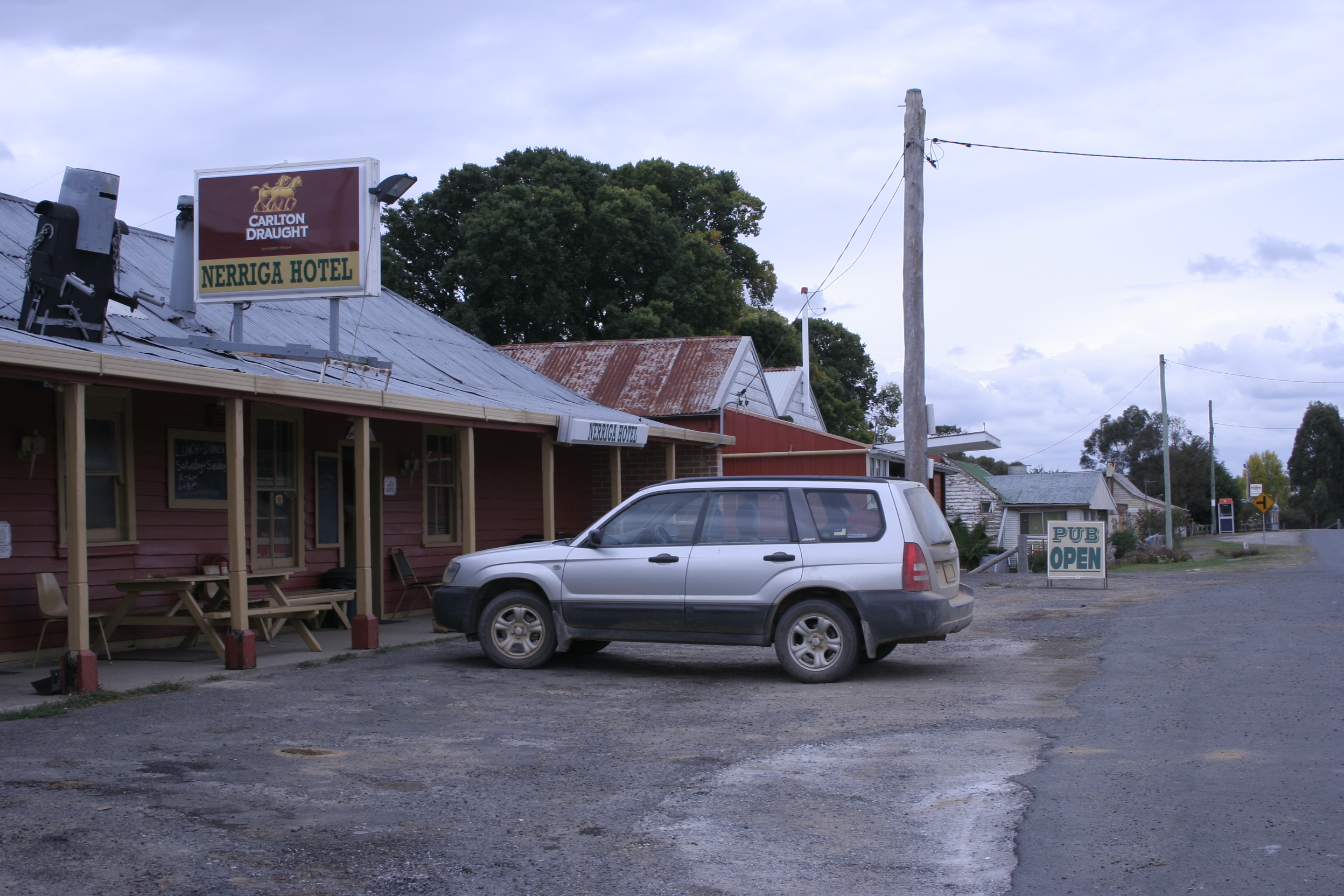
Nerriga Hotel

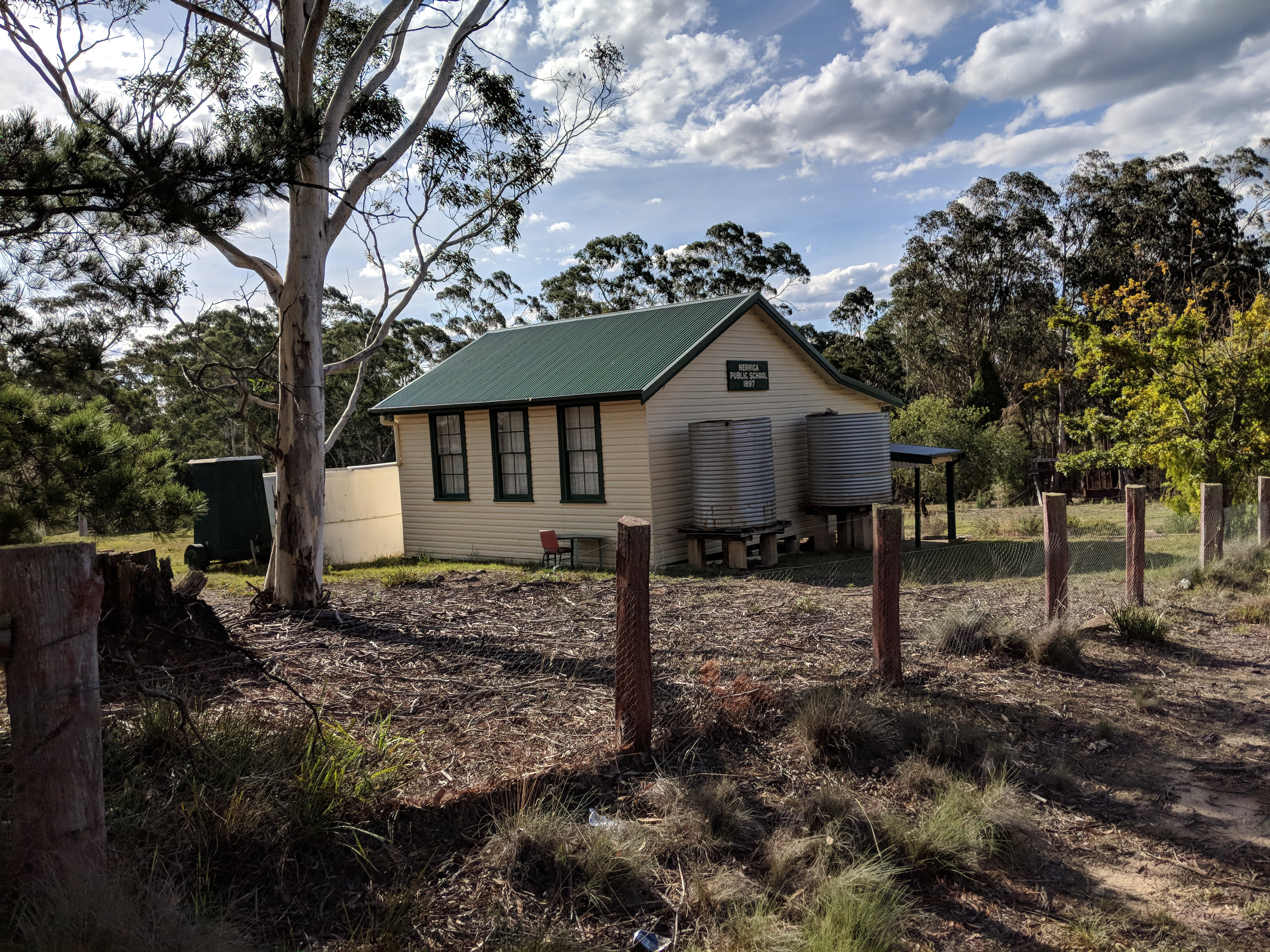
Nerriga Public School

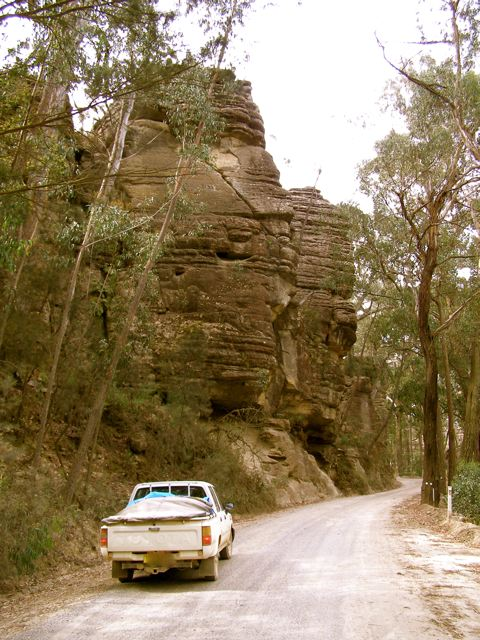
Nerriga to Nowra Road before upgrade - Escarpment in Morton National Park

In 1828, grazier George Galbraith was listed as the owner of some 2,000 acres (810 ha) of land on the Endrick River, to the east of the current village. This property was then known as "Narriga". The name "Nerriga" was first recorded by surveyor Robert Hoddle on an 1828 expedition of the Shoalhaven River. Following Galbraith's death in 1837, his land holdings were subsequently auctioned. Galbraith's holding was purchased by another settler, John Mackenzie, who had been granted land near Nerriga in 1836.

In 1840, James Larmer surveyed a village site and a route over the mountains from Nerriga to Vincentia. It was intended that this pass, known as The Wool Road would allow movement of agricultural produce to a port on Jervis Bay from the Braidwood and Goulburn districts. The road was completed in 1841, a distance of approximately 37 miles (60 km) at an estimated cost of £997. In 1842, the existing road linking Nerriga to Braidwood was substantially upgraded. Both projects utilised convict labour under the command of Nerriga landowner John Mackenzie.

The discovery of alluvial gold on the Shoalhaven River in 1851 led to increased interest in the area around Nerriga, and the town began to grow, with the Commercial Hotel opening for business some time around 1864. The building still stands today, but is now known as the Bark Tree Hotel. Records show that between 1878 and 1901, the peak of production in the area, some 14,177 ounces (401,900 g) of gold were produced from the Nerriga Mining Division. Some quartz reefs were also worked in the area, however the yields from these activities were not significant. Prospecting on a large scale continued through to the 1960s.

Nerriga had a state school from 1868 to 1917 and from 1928 to 1975. It was generally described as a "public school", but sometimes as "provisional" or "half-time."

In October 2010, a substantial upgrade of the road between Nerriga and Nowra was completed by the Roads & Traffic Authority, the Commonwealth Department of Infrastructure and Transport and the Shoalhaven City Council, providing high quality, sealed all-weather road access for the community. A community celebration was held to mark the completion of the upgrade.

In December 2019, the Currowan and Tianjara fires destroyed properties around Nerriga. The Nerriga Pub provided shelter for residents evacuated from their homes in the surrounding communities after thick smoke forced them to move from the community hall. Local residents continued to hose down the building for several hours to protect it from burning embers until volunteers from the New South Wales Rural Fire Service arrived.

== Climate ==
Climate data for Nerriga (1991–2020)
Month	Jan	Feb	Mar	Apr	May	Jun	Jul	Aug	Sep	Oct	Nov	Dec	Year
Record high °C (°F)	43.5 (110.3)	42.4 (108.3)	36.5 (97.7)	31.6 (88.9)	24.8 (76.6)	20.0 (68.0)	19.8 (67.6)	24.3 (75.7)	31.6 (88.9)	31.6 (88.9)	39.3 (102.7)	42.4 (108.3)	43.5 (110.3)
Mean daily maximum °C (°F)	27.1 (80.8)	25.5 (77.9)	23.2 (73.8)	19.9 (67.8)	16.0 (60.8)	12.9 (55.2)	12.3 (54.1)	13.8 (56.8)	16.9 (62.4)	20.0 (68.0)	22.4 (72.3)	25.1 (77.2)	19.6 (67.3)
Daily mean °C (°F)	20.1 (68.2)	19.2 (66.6)	17.0 (62.6)	13.3 (55.9)	9.8 (49.6)	7.2 (45.0)	6.4 (43.5)	7.4 (45.3)	10.3 (50.5)	13.3 (55.9)	15.8 (60.4)	18.2 (64.8)	13.2 (55.8)
Mean daily minimum °C (°F)	13.0 (55.4)	12.9 (55.2)	10.7 (51.3)	6.7 (44.1)	3.5 (38.3)	1.6 (34.9)	0.5 (32.9)	1.1 (34.0)	3.7 (38.7)	6.5 (43.7)	9.1 (48.4)	11.3 (52.3)	6.7 (44.1)
Record low °C (°F)	3.0 (37.4)	1.5 (34.7)	0.3 (32.5)	−5.5 (22.1)	−6.4 (20.5)	−7.1 (19.2)	−7.0 (19.4)	−8.2 (17.2)	−5.8 (21.6)	−5.2 (22.6)	−2.9 (26.8)	0.0 (32.0)	−8.2 (17.2)
Average precipitation mm (inches)	70.0 (2.76)	74.3 (2.93)	57.3 (2.26)	38.9 (1.53)	44.0 (1.73)	76.7 (3.02)	46.6 (1.83)	52.6 (2.07)	46.5 (1.83)	54.0 (2.13)	62.2 (2.45)	62.5 (2.46)	675.7 (26.60)
Average precipitation days (≥ 1 mm)	7.6	7.3	7.0	5.3	5.6	7.1	6.0	6.6	6.8	6.9	8.1	6.6	80.9
Average dew point °C (°F)	13.3 (55.9)	13.7 (56.7)	11.9 (53.4)	9.1 (48.4)	6.3 (43.3)	4.2 (39.6)	2.9 (37.2)	3.2 (37.8)	5.1 (41.2)	7.5 (45.5)	9.5 (49.1)	11.3 (52.3)	8.2 (46.8)
Source: National Oceanic and Atmospheric Administration
