= Jersey people =

Ethnic group

Jèrriais

Regions with significant populations
- Jersey 45,379 ▲ (2011); 46.4% self-identify as ethnic Jersey people

Languages
- English; Jèrriais; French

Religion
- Traditionally Christianity

Related ethnic groups
- Other British people; Normans; French; Guernésiais; Sercquiais; Auregnais

The Jersey people (Jèrriais: Jèrriais; French: Jersiais), also referred to as Islanders, are an ethnic group and nation native to the island of Jersey in the Channel Islands who share a common history, Norman ancestry and culture. There is no standard demonym for Jersey people; however, common demonyms include Jerseyman/Jerseywoman or Jèrriais. Jersey people are colloquially known as 'beans', after the Jersey bean crock - a traditional meal, or crapauds (the Jèrriais word for toad), the reason being that Jersey has toads and Guernsey does not. There is a statue in St. Helier of a toad, known as Le Crapaud. The Jersey toad is a unique species, which are bigger, breed earlier and use different habitats than English toads.

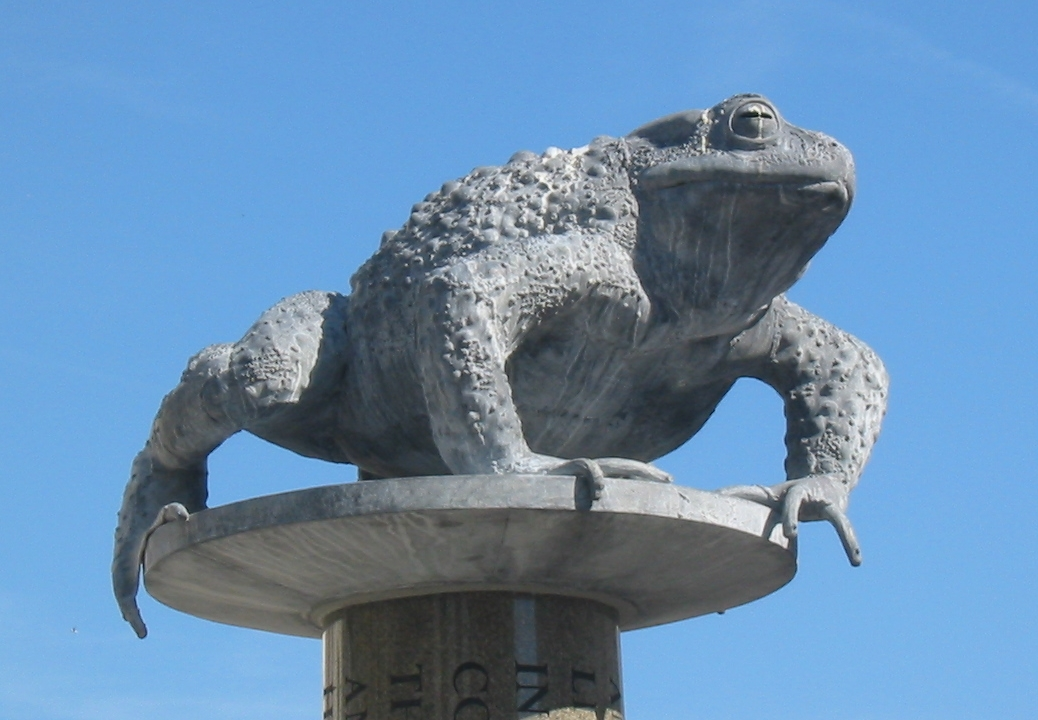
Le Crapaud statue in St Helier

== Characteristics ==
By the 19th century, the typical Jerseyman was still quite culturally Norman. He spoke Jèrriais, wore typically French clothes, and was in many other ways similar to a typical French peasant.

However, important cultural differences from the French distinguished the Jersey nation. For example, individualism, based around the importance of the household, was popularised by the island's adoption of Calvinism. French sociologist Dalido termed this cultural individualism imperméabilité (impermeability), which he said was characterised by the physically enclosed nature of Jersey fields. Despite this, islanders still co-operated in certain isolated economic aims where necessary, and social gatherings, such as the fêtes of the continent, were rare. A type of important social gathering was the veille - a long evening spent knitting around the fireside, probably originating from the island's knitting industry.

From the 19th century onwards, Jersey people have become increasingly anglicised. This was originally confined to St Helier, but has since spread to the country parishes, particularly through compulsory education, which has always been delivered exclusively in English.

== Population ==
Jersey is the largest and most populous island of the Channel Islands, an archipelago near the coast of France that is part of the British Isles. Jersey is a British Crown dependency and is not part of the United Kingdom of Great Britain and Northern Ireland.

=== Census ===
In the most recent 2011 Jersey census, 46.4% or 45,379 people self-identified their ethnic origins as Jersey, a numerical increase of 790 people over the previous 2001 census.

== Nationhood ==
The Jersey people and the Bailiwick of Jersey are recognised as a nation by the Government of Jersey, as a result of their review into Island identity.

There is historical evidence of recognition of Jersey ethnic and national identity, though this can be seen as a cultural defence constructed during increased nationalism globally, and increased anglicisation locally. For example, during the 19th century, the ongoing process of anglicisation was criticised by the Island newspaper Chronique, who argued that Jèrriais was the bastion of Jersey nationality. Philippe Le Sueur argued that figures in Jersey at the time, such as Abraham Le Cras, who wanted to see Jersey become more English, wanted to see "the complete destruction of our nationality". Jersey nationalist and Bailiff (from 1880) Robert Pipon Marett, said "I am a Jerseyman, jealous to preserve our nationality; being a British subject to have descended from these glorious Normans who left their country to avoid persecution but I will not allow our nationality to be swallowed up into that of England".

== Social structure ==
The historic social structure of Jerseymen does not match that of the English. The island's smaller and more close-knit population did not produce the same social divides historically as seen in larger countries. That is not to say that Jersey had no social hierarchy however. The historic social hierarchy consisted of the seigneurs at the top, the broad middle class of smallholder farmers, as well as tradesmen and merchants, and finally the landless poor.

This had an influence on Jersey's economic development. It was not possible politically for land to be forcefully taken to the same degree as occurred during the English enclosures. Instead, it made it possible to maintain a smallholder-based system of land ownership, which leads to the patchwork of comparatively small fields which dominates the island's rural landscape today.

== Jersey diaspora ==
There is a Jersey diaspora in a number of places. Some went to live in Canada as part of the Norman-Canadian community, especially during the early stages of colonialism. By 1837, there were an estimated 1237 Jersey people living in Canada. Jèrriais was widely spoken, surviving in Canada until the mid-20th century. Channel Islanders seemed to benefit from more education than the other locals and gained many positions in local politics and government. The Gaspé-Jersey-Guernsey Association is dedicated to the collection of artefacts, documents and other information about the history of Channel Island settlers on the Gaspé coast.

There were modest Jersey settlements in the American colonies in the 17th century, driven by religion, trade and a wish to escape from poverty. Settlement was concentrated in and around Boston. John Cabot was born in Jersey in 1580 and moved out to Salem. His descendants include a number of US Senators and John Kerry, former US Secretary of State. An example of a famous person of Jersey descent in North America is William Cody, a bison hunter and showman. The North American Cody family is descended from Philip Le Caudey, who came to Massachusetts from the island.

Jersey people have also emigrated to Great Britain. In the 1901 census in England and Wales, it is estimated that 12,000 people living there were Jersey-born. During World War II, due to the Occupation of Jersey, many Jersey people became refugees in England. In many places, Channel Island Societies were established to help refugee islanders keep in touch with each other (and to a limited extent with their occupied homeland). Many chose to emigrate from Jersey permanently after liberation.

Otherwise, many young Jersey people have left the island since the 19th century, seeking education or employment opportunities elsewhere (particularly in the UK).

The Government of Jersey is making attempts to support links between the Jersey diaspora and their home nation. For example, the GoJ London Office has created the 'Always Jersey' programme, which encourages Jersey émigrés to register to keep in touch with the island.

== Language ==
The traditional language of the Jersey people is Jèrriais, a form of the Norman French native and unique to the island. In more recent times, this has been surpassed by English, which is now the main language spoken by Jersey people.

== Culture ==
The culture of Jersey is a mixture Franco-British culture; however, modern Jersey culture is dominated by British cultural influences.

=== Cuisine ===
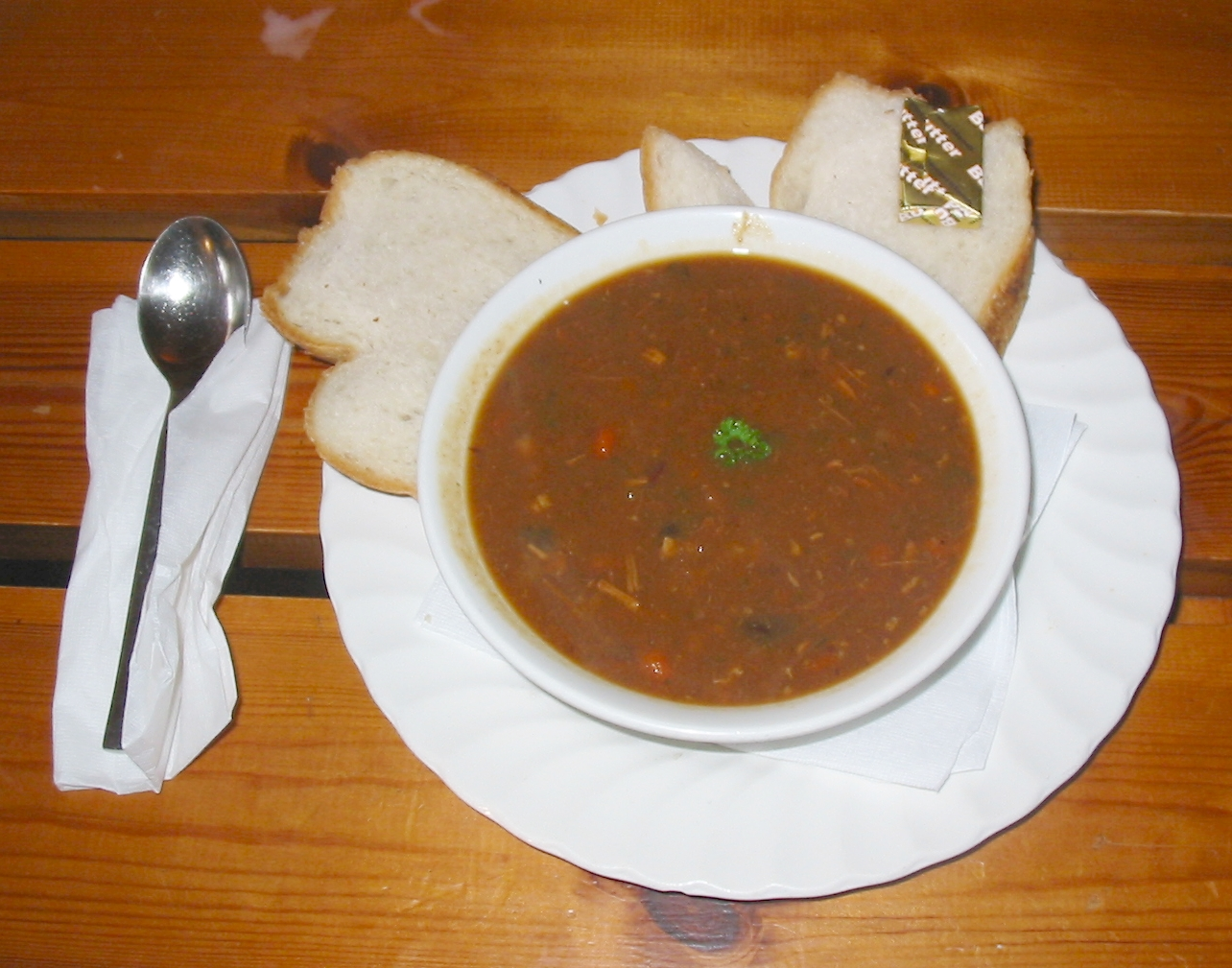
Bean crock, a traditional meal in Jersey giving locals the nickname 'Jersey bean'.

Bean crock (les pais au fou) is a slow-cooked pork and bean stew, most authentically containing a pig's trotter, water and onions. In the past the dish was so ubiquitous that English-speaking visitors, purporting to believe that the people of Jersey ate nothing else, dubbed the inhabitants Jersey beans.
