= Endrick River =

Coordinates: 35°00′S 150°03′E

Endrick River Bulee River, Main Creek
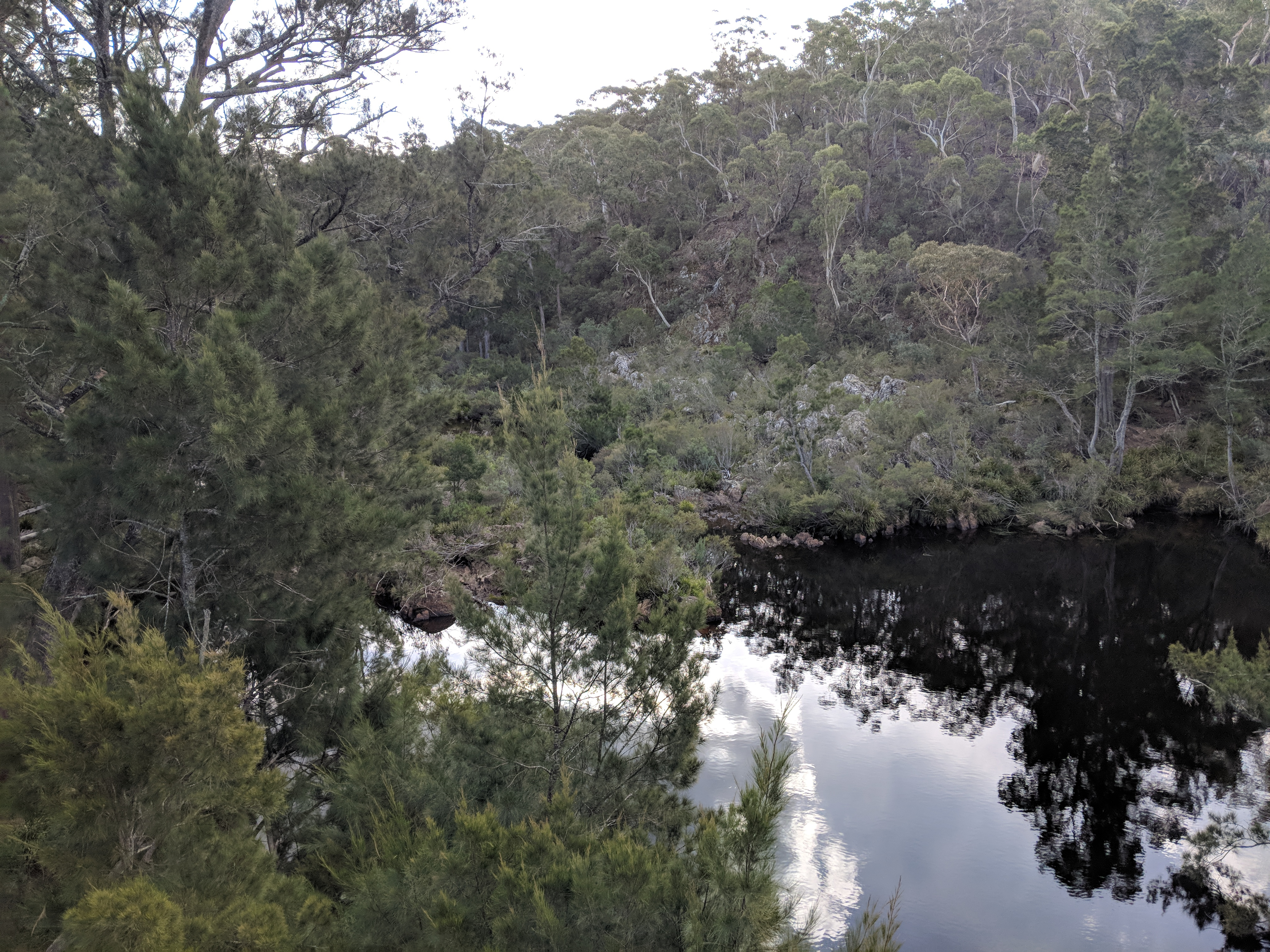
- Endrick river at Nerriga Road

Location
- Country: Australia
- State: New South Wales
- Region: Sydney Basin (IBRA), Southern Tablelands
- Local government area: Shoalhaven

Physical characteristics
- Source: Budawang Range
  - location: near Sassafras
  - elevation: 651 m (2,136 ft)
- Mouth: Shoalhaven River
  - location: near Nerriga
  - elevation: 227 m (745 ft)
- Length: 32 km (20 mi)

Basin features
- River system: Shoalhaven River
- Tributaries
  - left: Sallee Creek, Running Creek
  - right: Middle Creek (Shoalhaven, New South Wales), Bulee Brook, Brainbrig Creek, Coolumburra Creek
- National park: Morton NP

Endrick River is a perennial river of the Shoalhaven catchment in the Southern Tablelands region of New South Wales, Australia.

== Location and features ==
Endrick River rises below Quiltys Mountain on the western slopes of the Budawang Range near Sassafras, and flows generally south southwest, west, northwest, and then north by west, joined by six minor tributaries, before reaching its confluence with the Shoalhaven River near Nerriga, descending 424 metres (1,391 ft) over its 32 kilometres (20 mi) course.

== See also ==
- Budawang National Park
- List of rivers of Australia § New South Wales
- List of rivers of New South Wales (A–K)
- Morton National Park
- Rivers of New South Wales
