= Norman Canadians =

Norman Canadians are Canadians whose ancestors came from the Duchy of Normandy or the Channel Islands.

== List of Norman Canadians and notable Norman settlers ==
- Pierre de Chauvin de Tonnetuit: naval captain, lieutenant of New France and governor.
- Charles le Moyne de Longueuil et de Châteauguay: officer and merchant who was a prominent figure in the early days of Montreal.
- René-Robert Cavelier, Sieur de La Salle, colonist, namesake of LaSalle, Quebec.
- Pierre Boucher: Governor of Trois-Rivières, namesake of Boucherville.
- Jean Brebeuf: missionary, wrote a grammar and dictionary in the Wyandot language.
- Guillaume Couture: missionary, translator, diplomat, militia captain.
- Jacques Le Ber: merchant and lord at Montreal.
- Julien Dubuque: third generation Norman Canadian, namesake of Dubuque, Iowa.
- Charles Hus, dit Millet third generation Norman Canadian, political figure.
- Joseph Marie LaBarge, Senior: third generation Norman Canadian, frontiersman, trapper and fur trader.

== Surnames of Norman origin found in Canada ==
More than two million people in Quebec have a name of Norman origin.

- Anctil: a variant spelling of Anquetil.
- Bellemare: common family name in Mauricie.
- Bérubé: originates in the Pays de Caux.
- Carpentier: a surname from Picardy and Upper Normandy.
- Coté
- Gagné
- Gagnon
- Hébert: Norman variant of Herbert.
- Huneault (Toussaint Huneault was a Norman who was one of the first settlers in New France in the early 1600’s)
- Normand
- Talbot
- Toupin which was previously Toutain/Tostain (dit Dussault; Toussaint Toupin was a founding settler in New France and is 100% genetically Norman and a descendant of Thorstein a companion of Rollo)
- Ratelle (Ratel "Dit Dragon") a name from Rouen.
- Roy: Norman surname (also Leroy), meaning "king".
- Tremblay
- Trépanier.

== List of Canadian places named after places in Normandy ==
- Dieppe, New Brunswick: named in the memory of the 913 Canadians who were killed during the Dieppe Raid in the Second World War.
- Honfleur, Quebec
