= David M. Berube =

American writer, psychologist, science communicator and biologist

- Education: Seton Hall University (B.A/B.S.); Montclair State University (M.A.); New York University (Ph.D.)
- Awards: Fellow of the American Association for the Advancement of Science
- Scientific career
- Workplaces: North Carolina State University

David M. Berube is an American scholar specializing in science and technology communication, risk communication, and public understanding of emerging technologies.

He is currently a professor of communication at North Carolina State University in Raleigh, North Carolina and serves as the director of the Public Communication of Science and Technology project. His research focuses on how the public comprehends complex scientific information, particularly regarding nanotechnology, climate change, public health issues, digital literacy and quantum biotechnology .

== Education ==
He received an MA from Montclair State University in 1978 and a BA/BS from Seton Hall University in 1975. He earned his Ph.D from New York University in 1990 and has studied and taught communication and cognitive psychology and created the term SEIN (Social and Ethical Implications of Nanotechnology) in his book NanoHype.

== Career ==
Since 2008, he has directed a program titled the Public Communication of Science and Technology, which has focused on consumer and public understanding of highly complicated science and engineering communication activities. He teaches limited graduate coursework (due to his grant responsibilities).

Prior to NCSU, he was a professor at the University of South Carolina, Columbia, South Carolina, and was a lecturer at Weber State University (UT), Trinity University (TX), and the University of Vermont. During the last 30 years through 2007, he served as a national and international intercollegiate debating coach with many national records, coaching over 40 formal national and international debating topics. He edited one of the most successful collegiate debate workbook companies in America, and he is a coordinating editor with the Journal of Nanoparticle Research where he supervises social science methodologies. He served on the US FDA Risk Communication Advisory Committee and on the Board of Scientific Counselors for the National Toxicology Program.

After coaching two national championships at the National Parliamentary Tournament of Excellence in 2004 & 2005 and promoted to full professor, he returned to studying science and technology communication and cognitive psychology.

In 1997, he wrote the famous "Berube 97" article on dehumanization, which has been used by high school and collegiate debaters in almost every debate since. In 2006, he wrote Nanohype: The Truth Behind the Nanotechnology Buzz. Amherst, NY: Prometheus Press, 2005, 500 pp. and received over 30 published reviews. In 2015, he broadened his interests to include public understanding of synthetic biology and became a research fellow with the Genetic Engineering and Society Center on the campus of North Carolina State. In 2021 he edited Pandemic Communication and Resiliency for Springer/NATURE and in 2023 he wrote a sole author work: Pandemic Risk Management: Lessons from the Zika Virus.

Berube has worked on a series of projects for the corporate world, including serving as Director of Communications for the International Council on Nanotechnology, with partners including Intel, Swiss RE, Mitsubishi, L'Oreal, Procter & Gamble, etc. He has directed social media projects that produced White Paper-level publications for the National Science Foundation and the International Food Information Council. He has consulted directly with Kraft Foods Group Inc. on media protocols and has spoken as an invited lecturer at the Pentagon, Pharma, and the Institute for Defense Analysis, among others. He is a CoPI with the Research Triangle Nanotechnology Network (RTNN) as the social and ethical director and assessment officer coordinating in a major infrastructure grant under the National Nanotechnology Initiative's (NNI) National Nanotechnology Coordinated Infrastructure in a team headed found in North Carolina's Research Triangle.

The RTNN involves labs on three campuses: North Carolina State, UNC at Chapel Hill, and Duke. by the Analytical Instrumentation Facility at North Carolina State University including labs at UNC and Duke, specifically Chapel Hill Analytical and Fabrication Facility and (CHANL) at the University of North Carolina at Chapel Hill and the Shared Materials Instrumentation Facility (SMIF) at Duke University.

Berube has consulted as a jobber with the Gerson Lehrman Group and others. He manages the Center for Emerging Technologies, LLC, a consultancy registered in North Carolina.

In 2023, he was elected as a Fellow by the American Association for the Advancement of Science for his work in science communication.

== Research ==
Berube has been a principal investigator or co-principal investigator on over $20 million in National Science Foundation (NSF) grants.

His research includes studying public understanding of toxicological information related to nanoparticles and developing strategies for effective science communication.

He has also edited and authored works on pandemic communication and resilience, including the 2021 book Pandemic Communication and Resilience, the 2023 book Pandemic Risk Management: Lessons from the Zika Virus. and 2024 book Pandemic Resilience Vaccination Resistance and Hesitance, Lessons from COVID-19.

Additionally, Berube has served on advisory committees for the U.S. Food and Drug Administration (FDA) and the National Toxicology Program, providing expertise on risk communication and public health issues.

Beyond academia, Berube has contributed to public discourse through various media outlets.

He has written over 100 articles for major newspapers and has been involved in intercollegiate debate coaching, leading teams to national championships. His expertise in science communication has led to invitations to speak at national and international conferences, as well as consultations with organizations such as the International Council on Nanotechnology and the U.S. Environmental Protection Agency.

Starmakers debate handbooks were a popular series of academic debate and evidence sourcebooks published in the 1980s and 1990s by Starmakers, Inc. in Columbia, SC. Edited by Berube, these materials were widely used by CEDA (Cross Examination Debate Association) competitors across the U.S. to prepare for national tournaments. Berube also wrote Pandemic Resilience: Vaccination Resistance and Hesitance, Lessons from COVID-19 (2025), a volume published by Springer Nature as part of the Risk, Systems and Decisions series. The book examines factors contributing to vaccine hesitancy and resistance, including misinformation, public trust, political influences, and health communication strategies.

== Selected publications ==
- Berube, David (September 30, 2006). Nano Hype: The Truth Behind the Nanotechnology Buzz. Manas Publications. p. 436. ISBN 978-8170493099.
- Linkov, Igor; Trump, Benjamin D.; Anklam, Elke; Berube, David; Boisseasu, Patrick; Cummings, Christopher; Ferson, Scott; Florin, Marie-Valentine; Goldstein, Bernard; Hristozov, Danail; Jensen, Keld Alstrup; Katalagarianakis, Georgios; Kuzma, Jennifer; Lambert, James H.; Malloy, Timothy (2018-05-04). "Comparative, collaborative, and integrative risk governance for emerging technologies". Environment Systems and Decisions. 38 (2): 170–176. doi:10.1007/s10669-018-9686-5. ISSN 2194-5403. PMC 10569133.
- Borm, Paul J.A.; Berube, David (2008). "A tale of opportunities, uncertainties, and risks". Nano Today. 3 (1–2): 56–59. doi:10.1016/s1748-0132(08)70016-1. ISSN 1748-0132.
- Berube, David M. (2008-03-11). "Rhetorical gamesmanship in the nano debates over sunscreens and nanoparticles". Journal of Nanoparticle Research. 10 (S1): 23–37. doi:10.1007/s11051-008-9362-7. ISSN 1388-0764.
- Cummings, Christopher L.; Berube, David M.; Lavelle, Mary E. (2013). "Influences of individual-level characteristics on risk perceptions to various categories of environmental health and safety risks". Journal of Risk Research. 16 (10): 1277–1295. doi:10.1080/13669877.2013.788544. ISSN 1366-9877.
- Schwartzman, Roy; Ross, Derek G.; Berube, David M. (2011-02-01). "Rhetoric and Risk". Poroi. 7 (1): 1–9. doi:10.13008/2151-2957.1087. ISSN 2151-2957.
- Berube, David M.; Cummings, Christopher L.; Frith, Jordan H.; Binder, Andrew R.; Oldendick, Robert (2011-03-19). "Comparing nanoparticle risk perceptions to other known EHS risks". Journal of Nanoparticle Research. 13 (8): 3089–3099. doi:10.1007/s11051-011-0325-z. ISSN 1388-0764.
- Berube, David; Cummings, Christopher; Cacciatore, Michael; Scheufele, Dietram; Kalin, Jason (2010-09-30). "Characteristics and classification of nanoparticles: Expert Delphi survey". Nanotoxicology. 5 (2): 236–243. doi:10.3109/17435390.2010.521633. ISSN 1743-5390.
- Berube, David M. (2009), "Intuitive Toxicology: The Public Perception of Nanoscience", Nanotechnology & Society, Dordrecht: Springer Netherlands, pp. 91–108, doi:10.1007/978-1-4020-6209-4_5, ISBN 978-1-4020-9385-2
- Berube, D.; Shipman, J.D. (2004). "Denialism". IEEE Technology and Society Magazine. 23 (4): 22–26. doi:10.1109/mtas.2004.1371635. ISSN 0278-0097.
- Berube, David M., ed. (2021). "Pandemic Communication and Resilience". Risk, Systems and Decisions. doi:10.1007/978-3-030-77344-1. ISBN 978-3-030-77343-4. ISSN 2626-6717.
- Berube, David M. (2008-11-20). "The public acceptance of nanomedicine: a personal perspective". WIREs Nanomedicine and Nanobiotechnology. 1 (1): 2–5. doi:10.1002/wnan.30. ISSN 1939-5116.
- Berube, David M. (2021), "A Story About Toilet Paper: Pandemic Panic-Buying and Public Resilience", Pandemic Communication and Resilience, Risk, Systems and Decisions, Cham: Springer International Publishing, pp. 143–165, doi:10.1007/978-3-030-77344-1_9, ISBN 978-3-030-77343-4
- Berube, David M. (2018-04-27). "How social science should complement scientific discovery: lessons from nanoscience". Journal of Nanoparticle Research. 20 (5) 120. doi:10.1007/s11051-018-4210-x. ISSN 1388-0764.
- Berube, David M. (1 January 2025). Pandemic Resilience: Vaccination Resistance and Hesitance, Lessons from COVID-19. Springer Nature. ISBN 978-3-031-74062-6.
