= Bellmore =

Bellmore or Bellmores may refer to:

- "The Bellmores, New York", a collective term referring to Bellmore and North Bellmore
  - Bellmore, New York, census-designated place (CDP) in Nassau County, New York, United States
  - North Bellmore, New York, census-designated place (CDP) in Nassau County, New York, United States
- Bellmore, Indiana, unincorporated community in Union Township, Parke County, Indiana, United States
- Bellmore station, a train station in Bellmore, New York
- 6445 Bellmore, an asteroid
- Cory Bellmore, Canadian politician

== See also ==
- Belmore (disambiguation)
- Bellemore, surname
