= Belmore Falls =

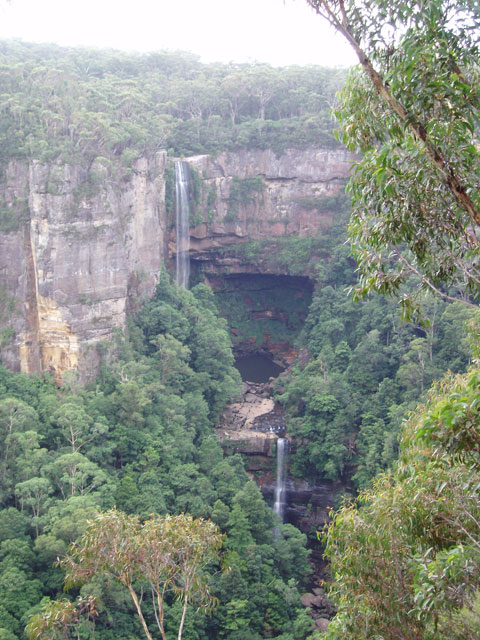

- Location within New South Wales
- Location: Southern Highlands and Illawarra, New South Wales, Australia
- Coordinates: 34°38′25″S 150°33′35″E
- Type: Plunge
- Elevation: 552 metres (1,811 ft) AHD
- Total height: 77–130 metres (253–427 ft)
- Number of drops: 3
- Watercourse: Barrengarry Creek

The Belmore Falls is a plunge waterfall with three drops on the Barrengarry Creek in the Southern Highlands and Illawarra regions of New South Wales, Australia.

== Location and features ==
Located approximately 6.5 kilometres (4.0 mi) south of the town of Robertson, the falls descend from the Illawarra escarpment at an elevation of 552 metres (1,811 ft) above sea level into the northern end of Kangaroo Valley within the Morton National Park. Descending over three drops, the waterfalls range in height between 77–130 metres (253–427 ft) and are best viewed from the Hindmarsh Lookout, accessible via a short walk from a road heading south east from Burrawang.

The falls were named after Somerset Lowry-Corry, 4th Earl Belmore the then-Governor of New South Wales.

== See also ==
- List of waterfalls
- List of waterfalls in Australia
