= International Council on Nanotechnology =

Coordinates: 29.719°N 95.401°W

The International Council on Nanotechnology (ICON) is an international, multi-stakeholder group committed to developing and communicating information regarding potential environmental and health risks of nanotechnology, thereby fostering risk reduction while maximizing societal benefit. ICON is composed of individuals from academia, industry, government and non-governmental organizations from countries of high nanotechnology research and development activity. ICON is a technically driven organization and does not engage in advocacy or commercial activities.

== History ==
ICON was founded in 2004 as an extension of the US National Science Foundation Center for Biological and Environmental Nanotechnology (CBEN) at Rice University in Houston, Texas. CBEN was founded in 2001 as one of the first six federally funded Nanoscale Science and Engineering Centers. There are now 16 of these NSECs. NSF research centers are expected to engage in a broad range of activities that bring the discoveries of the lab into the wider world. These activities typically include partnerships with industry for the purposes of technology transfer, graduate student training, and other commercialization goals. Recognizing that the issues of nanotechnology's risks and benefits have the ability to provoke considerable social controversy, CBEN's early industrial sponsors encouraged the creation of ICON as a way of engaging in a broader dialogue with groups likely to be affected by or active in the debate.

After a start-up phase, ICON completed its first project in August 2005 with the web publication of a database on nanotechnology environmental, health and safety research (EHS). Initially compiled by a team at Oak Ridge National Laboratory for the Chemical Industry Consultative Board on Advancing Nanotechnology, the database was turned over to ICON in spring 2005 to maintain and make web accessible. Further refinements have been made to the database over the years, including weekly updates, better indexing and search functionalities, and a Virtual Journal of Nanotechnology Environment, Health and Safety interface. The Virtual Journal and database are now widely used by people around the world to find abstracts, citations and links to published research papers on nanotechnology EHS.

== Activities ==
- Forums and events to explore health and environmental risk issues in nanotechnology
- An electronic knowledge base for accessing peer-reviewed publications in nanotechnology
- High-quality technical information relevant to decision makers in nanotechnology
- A proactive communications platform that translates complex scientific data into material easily understood by many stakeholders

== Major projects ==
- Environment, Health & Safety Database and Virtual Journal
- Survey of Current Practices for Handling Nanomaterials in Occupational Settings
- International Research Needs Assessment for Nanomaterial Environment, Health & Safety
