= Bungonia State Recreation Area =

Coordinates: 34°47′43″S 150°00′50″E

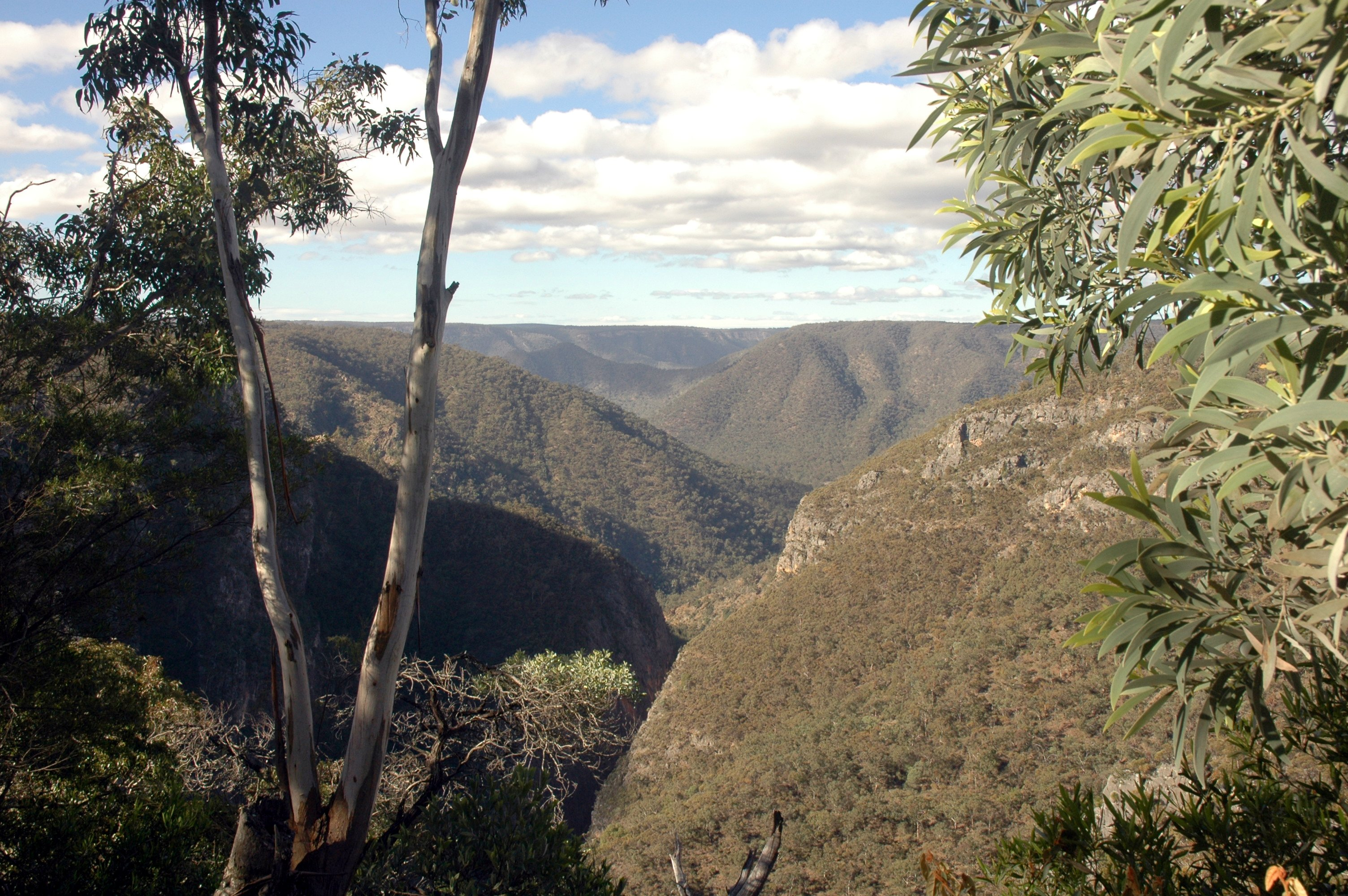
View from the Bungonia Lookdown

The Bungonia State Recreation Area (SRA) is a nature reserve near the city of Goulburn, New South Wales Australia.

The SRA is about 35 kilometres (22 mi) east of Goulburn and about 125 kilometres (78 mi) south-west of Sydney, and it adjoins the Morton National Park.

The area features dramatic cliffs, gorges and a network of caves. Besides caving, it is used for bushwalking, camping, and other adventure activities. A nearby lookout, known as "The Lookdown", has views of the Shoalhaven River, Bungonia Gorge and Bungonia Creek.

Many fossils can be found along the various walking tracks in the area.

The appearance of the area is currently marred by the presence of an adjoining limestone quarry. The quarry is to cease operations by 2011, followed by site remediation.

== Gallery ==
Some views from Bungonia lookdown, New South Wales, Australia. The limestone quarry is visible in the fourth image.

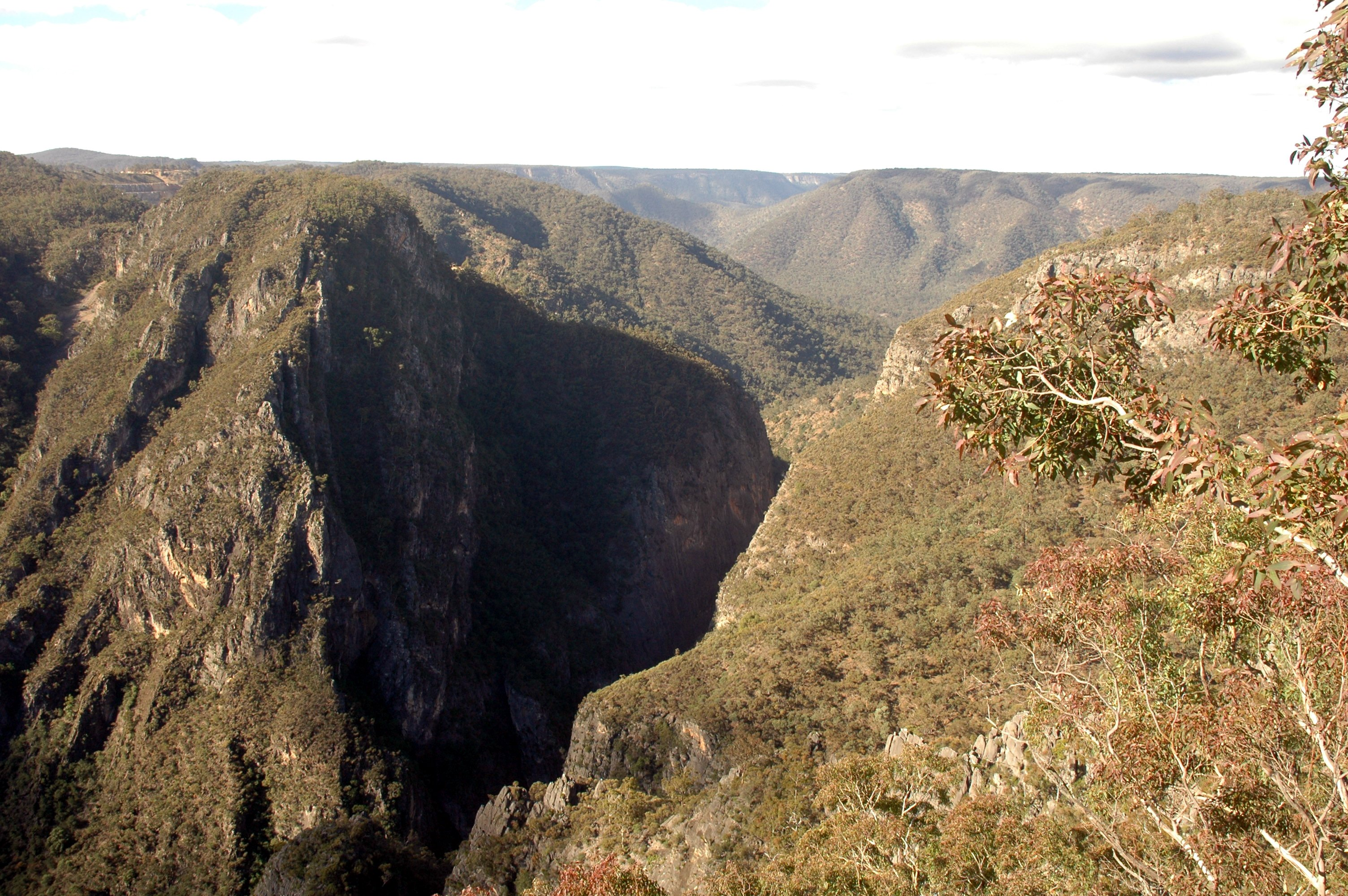

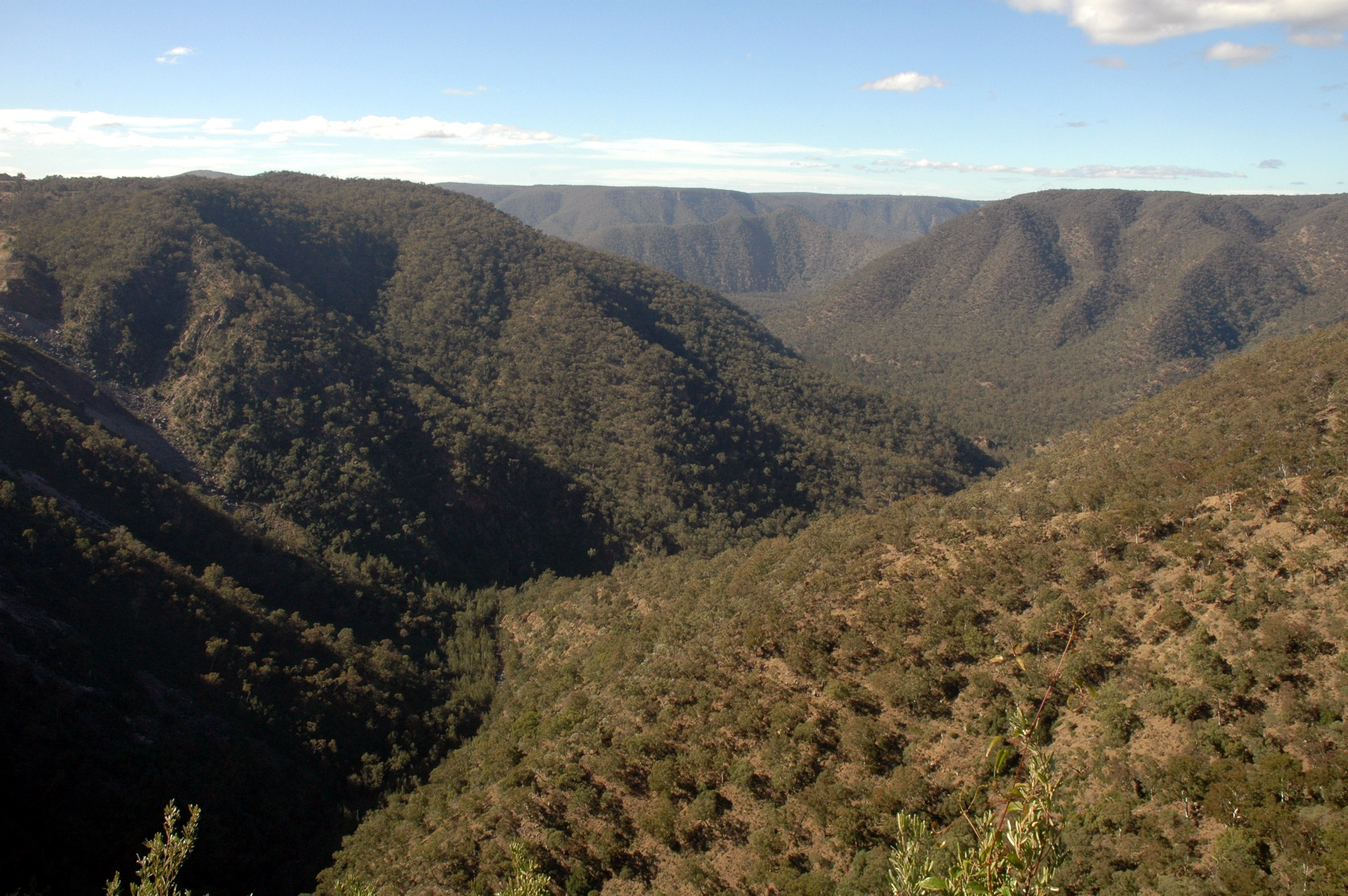

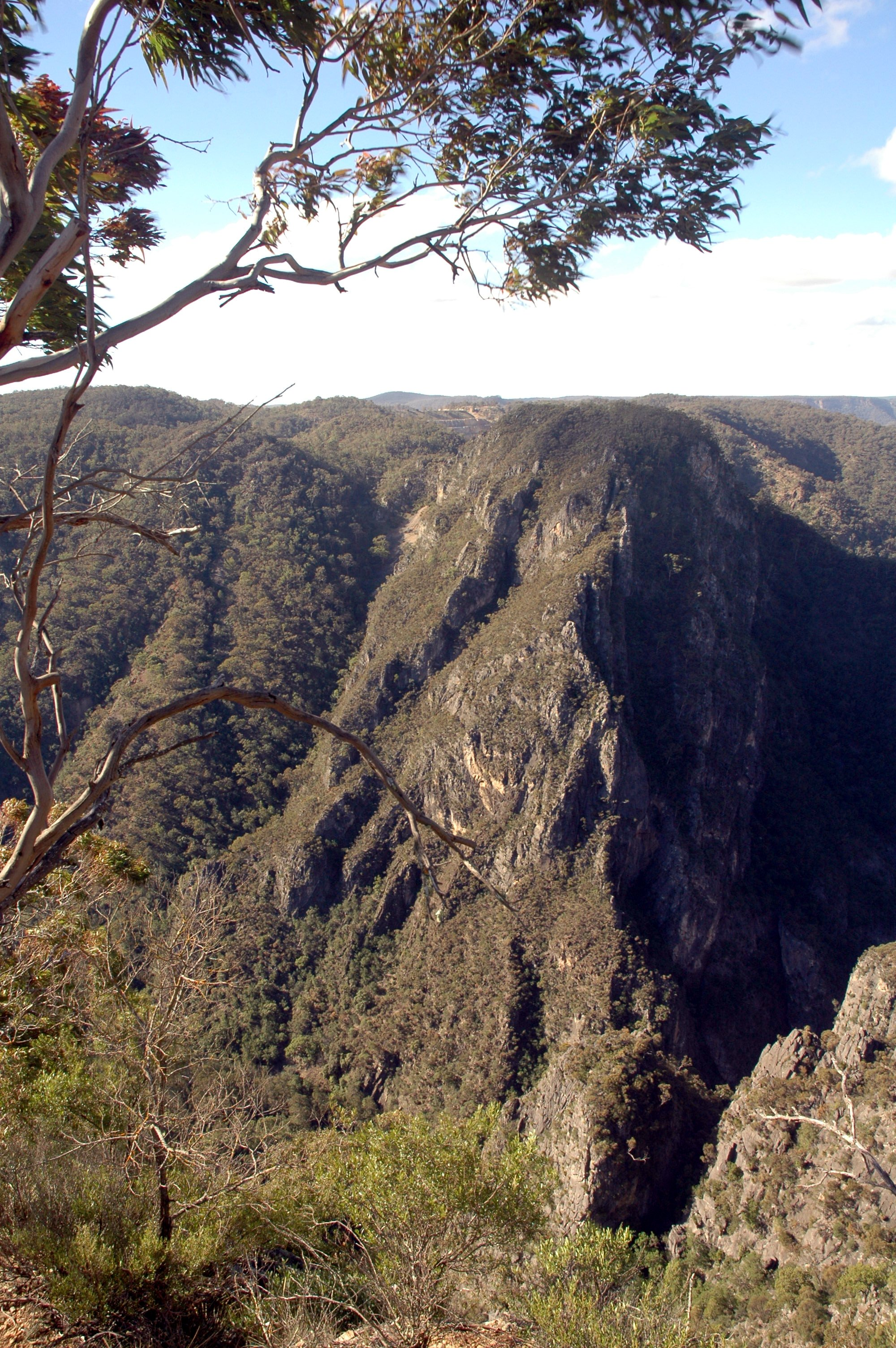

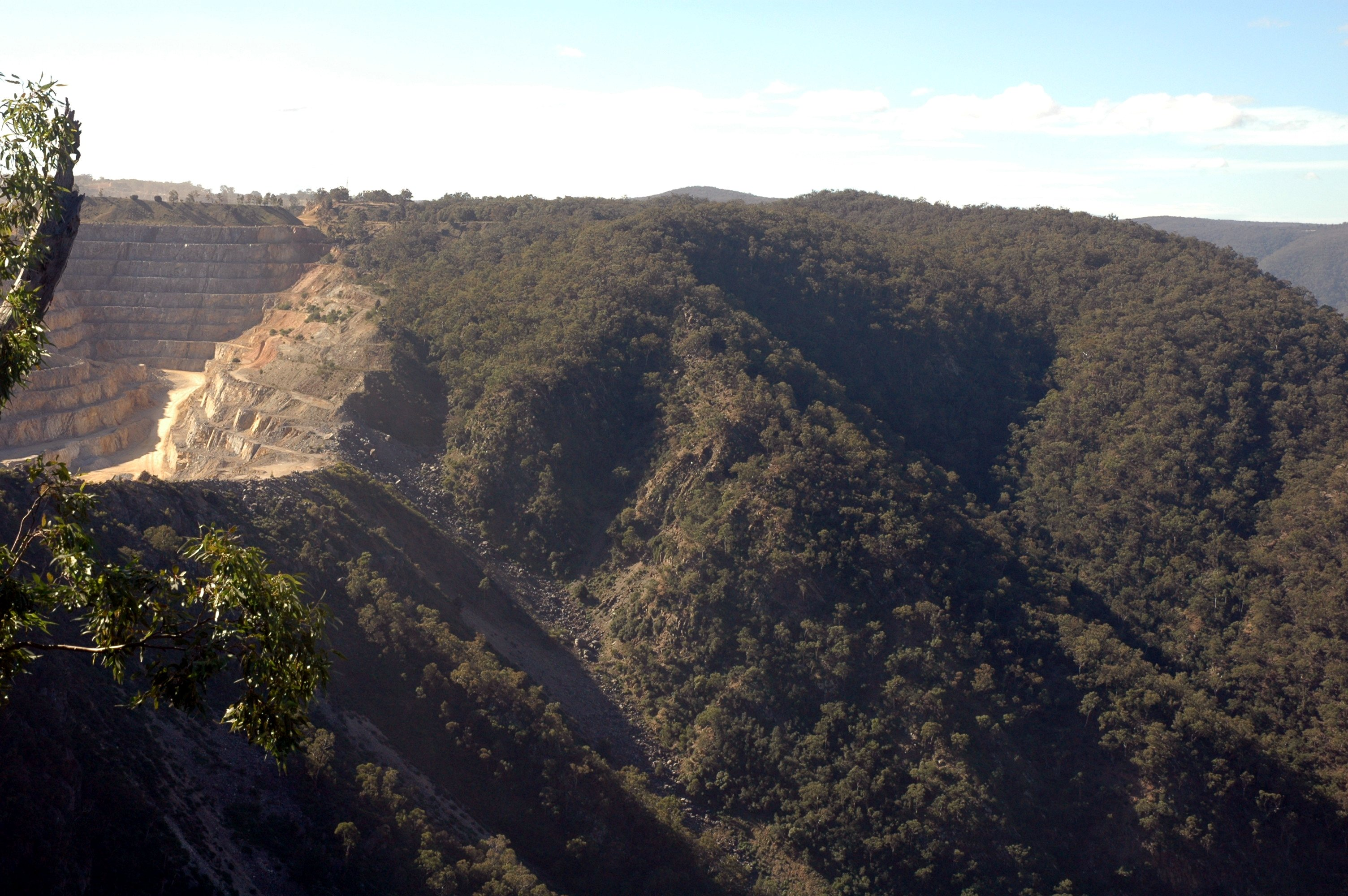
