= Bellemare =

Bellemare (/ˈbɛlmɑːr/; French pronunciation: [bɛlmɑʁ]) is a Norman surname, that means "somebody from Bellemare", name of several hamlets in Normandy (± 20). It is also one of the most common family names in Mauricie, Quebec. It is a compound of French belle "nice, pretty" and mare "mere, lake, pond", Norman word of Old Norse origin marr "sea", finally borrowed from Norman by French around 1600 as "pond, puddle".

== History of the Canadian Bellemares ==
The Bellemares share a common ancestor with the Gélinas: Étienne Gellineau, a sargier, or maker of serge fabric, from La Salenderie, close to Saintes in France's Saintonge area (now known as Charente-Maritime). Gellineau married France Huguette Robert in Saint-Michel's catholic Church 27 June 1645. He settled the Mauricie area in 1658 and worked for three years as an indentured servant for Pierre Boucher, Governor of Trois-Rivières. Gellineau had three sons: Étienne, Jean-Baptiste and Pierre. Jean-Baptiste eventually took the name Bellemare.

=== Traditions ===
Rituals preserved by the Bellemares include the paternal blessing (French: la benédiction paternelle). Until the mid-1980s and in some cases even to this day, it has been customary for the children and grandchildren of a Bellemare family unit to ask their patriarch to bless them on New Year's Day. The practice is not exclusive to the Bellemare Family.

== People ==
Notable people with the name include:

- Adélard Bellemare (1871–1933), Canadian politician
- Alex Bellemare (born 1993), Canadian skier
- Annie Bellemare (born 1980), Canadian figure skater
- Daniel Bellemare (born 1952), Canadian prosecutor
- Daniel Bellemare (figure skater) (born 1980), Canadian figure skater
- Diane Bellemare (born 1949), Canadian economist and politician
- Dionel Bellemare (1880–1950), Canadian politician
- Eugène Bellemare (1932–2018), Canadian politician
- Gilles Bellemare (composer) (born 1952), Canadian composer, conductor, and music educator
- Gilles Bellemare (politician) (1932–1980), member of the National Assembly of Quebec
- Jonathan Bellemare (born 1982), Canadian ice hockey player
- Marc Bellemare (born 1956), Canadian lawyer and politician
- Maurice Bellemare (1912–1989), Canadian politician
- Michel Bellemare (born 1967), Canadian politician
- Pierre Bellemare (1929–2018), French writer, novelist, radio personality, television presenter, TV producer, and director
- Pierre-Édouard Bellemare (born 1985), French ice hockey player
- Rose-Eliandre Bellemare (born 1989), French artistic gymnast
- Rykko Bellemare, Canadian film actor
- Sylvain Bellemare (born 1968), Canadian sound editor and sound designer
