= Morton National Park =

National park in Australia

- IUCN category II (national park)
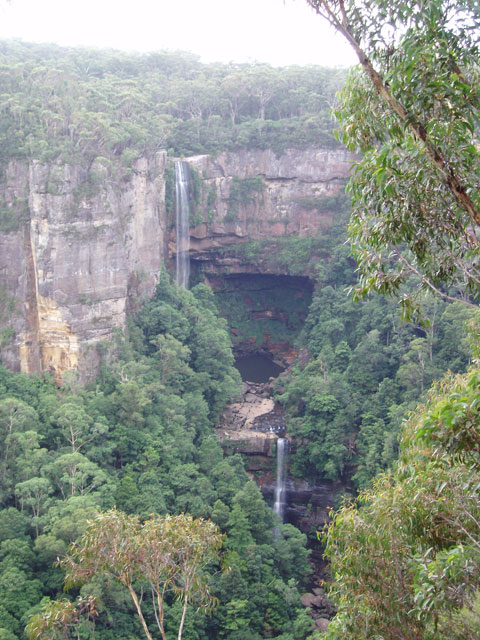
- Belmore Falls

- Location within New South Wales
- Location: New South Wales
- Nearest city: Basin View
- Coordinates: 35°10′55″S 150°12′29″E
- Area: 199,745 ha (771.22 sq mi)
- Established: 1 October 1967
- Governing body: NSW National Parks & Wildlife Service
- Website: Official website

The Morton National Park is a 199,745-hectare (493,580-acre) national park located in the Southern Highlands, South Coast and Illawarra regions of New South Wales, Australia, situated approximately 170 kilometres (110 mi) south southwest of Sydney.

== Location and features ==
The most notable attractions are the Fitzroy Falls that are located adjacent to the main road linking the Southern Highlands with the upper South Coast and lower Illawarra regions, via Kangaroo Valley; and the Pigeon House Mountain that is located west of Milton. The NSW National Parks and Wildlife Service–managed park consists mostly of a flat plateau dissected by steep gorges, tilting gently to the northeast. The boundaries of the park extend from Bundanoon south to the west of Ulladulla and the park contains part of the Budawang Range. To the south of the park is the adjacent Budawang National Park. In the north section of the park, the Fitzroy Falls and the Belmore Falls plunge off the plateau into rainforest gullies. The Shoalhaven River flows in the north and northwest sections of the park. In the east is Mount Tianjara, with an elevation of 768 metres (2,520 ft) above sea level.

== History ==
The Morton National Park was opened in 1938 and was named after Mark Morton, a state legislative assembly member, who passionately advocated for its establishment. It is estimated to have been inhabited by the aboriginal people almost 20,000 years ago. The Yuin people attach great significance to the park and its surrounding areas along with the Didthul mountain, which is a part of the aboriginal mythology.

== See also ==
- Fitzroy Falls, New South Wales
- Protected areas of New South Wales
