= John Hawdon (colonial settler) =

Australian colonial settler (1801–1881)

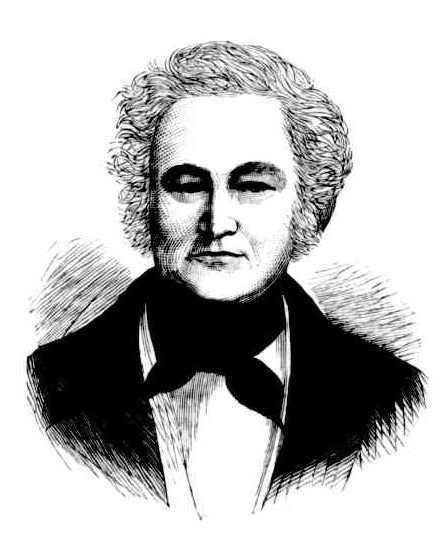
John Hawdon

John Hawdon (1801—1881) was an English-born colonial settler of New South Wales. He is associated with the area around Moruya, particularly Kiora and Tuross Head, on the South Coast of New South Wales, Australia, although he was also a pioneering landholder of other areas of the colony. He had a reputation as a 'land taker', all his land having been taken from its traditional owners, either by a land grant or squatting licence.

== Early life and family background ==
Hawdon was born at Wackerfield (near Staindrop), Durham, England, prematurely, on 29 June 1801. His father was also named John and his mother was Elizabeth (née Hunt). His father, John Hawdon (1770—1845), was described as a 'yeoman', indicating that he came from a social stratum above a free-born labourer but was not a member of the gentry. As well as farming, Hawdons' father was an officer in the Staindrop Gentlemen and Yeomanry (later Staindrop Volunteer Cavalry), a volunteer force raised during the Napoleonic Wars; initially he was a second lieutenant, later rising to the rank of captain.

Hawdons' father's 520 acre farm was mainly used to breed and grow sheep. The land had in earlier times been owned by the Hawdon family, but was, by Hawdon's father's time, a part of the estate associated with Raby Castle. Hawdon was the eldest of three sons. His younger brother William Hawdon (1812-1879) stayed in England and later took over the running of the family farm.

== Life in New South Wales ==
=== Migrant ===
He arrived in Sydney aboard Caroline, on 12 September 1828, with his wife, and two sons, one newly-born at sea. The family came well prepared, bringing with them a piano and many animals including "eight dogs, about 40 sheep, pigs, and poultry in abundance, a cow, a goat with two kids", and £2,500 in capital. He also brought with him letters-of-introduction to prominent colonists including, Thomas Iceley, Rev. William Cowper, Rev. Samuel Marsden, and Dr. James Bowman (who was married to a daughter of John Macarthur and Elizabeth Macarthur).

The administration of Governor Ralph Darling saw the creation of many great fortunes that begun with land grants in the colony, to those that the Governor favoured, and the cheap labour of assigned convicts. What is most notable about Hawdon, among those favoured by Darling, was that he was not an ex-military man and actually had a background in agriculture. This distinction, together with his innate personal energy and optimism, probably explains, at least in part, why he would become so successful.

=== Landholdings and farming ===
After arriving in the colony, he rented land at the Cowpastures, known as 'Elderslie', and quickly got to work. He wrote, "The Governor has been pleased at two dinner parties to express his sentiments of approbation on me, saying I had begun like one who is determined to do well, for I had not been eight days in the Colony before I had my ploughs going." 'Elderslie' grew hay, for fattening cattle, and also a small crop of tobacco. Hawdon already had a reputation as a good master of his assigned convicts; none of the convicts he had working at Elderslie were sent to the Cawdor Bench of Magistrates for punishment.

Hawdon used his time at 'Elderslie' to search the colony himself, looking for suitable land that would be his land grant. He identified various pieces of land—near Lake George, Bong Bong, and Myrtle Creek—but his attempts to be granted those pieces of land fell through for various reasons. Still searching for land, he rode from Braidwood, down the Deua River valley, and found some land on the southern side of the Moruya River. In March 1831, he applied for that land. He moved onto the land, beginning cultivation and building stockyards, barns and fences. However, in July 1831, he was informed that, as the land lay just outside the limits of settlement, the land grant would not be given to him. The four years that he had, to take up a grant and settle on it, had expired, but he successfully sought an extension, until October 1831. He finally found his land, around the junction of Moogandoora Creek and the Moruya River, in September 1831.

Hawdon was granted 2560 acres of land at Kiora, in 1831, and moved there from 'Elderslie', in 1832. Kiora lay on the northern side of the Moruya River, at the southern-most limit of the Nineteen Counties, in which settlement was allowed by the colonial government. He had a house built there, known as 'Kiora House'. In the same year, 1832, as a squatter, he took up land at Howlong, on the Murray River, which he used for grazing cattle.

He worked his land at Kiora using assigned convict labour; at one time employing as many as 100, across various occupations, resulting in his remote estate being nearly self sufficient. He seems to have treated his assigned convicts, or 'government men', relatively well; probably as a result, he reported that he had little difficulty in managing them. Later, the blacksmith's forge, the mill, tailor's and shoemaker's shops, and the other trades that he brought to the district would be the nucleus of the town of Moruya.

Encouraged by Hawdon, who was enthusiastic and optimistic about prospects in the colony, his youngest brother Joseph Hawdon (1813 – 1871) came to Australia in 1834. In conjunction with his younger brother, Hawdon contracted for the first overland mail service between Sydney and the new settlement at Melbourne, in 1837, using one of his stockmen, John Bourke, as the mailman. Bourke carried Joseph Hawdon's pair of dueling pistols as protection. It was from Hawdon's land at Howlong (then known, confusingly, as Oolong) that Joseph Hawdon and two other men—John Gardiner and John Hepburn—drove cattle overland, for the first time, to the new colony of South Australia, in 1836. Both Hawdon brothers were early members of the Melbourne Club.

It was Hawdon who wrote to the Governor in 1836, pointing out the dependence of the settlers on the safe anchorage and port at Broulee, leading to the surveying of a township there in 1837, by James Larmer.

Wanting more land, from 1836, Hawdon squatted on a huge piece of land south of the Moruya River, comprising the areas known today as Congo, Bergalia, Tuross Head and Bodalla. This squatting run was referred to as 'Bergalia'. In 1843, he established an outstation at Bodalla. In 1848, he was able to obtain a Crown Lease over 30,000 acres of land in the area, much of it prime land. A large portion of the Crown Lease, around Bodalla, later became part of the estate of Thomas Suttcliff Mort, although Hawdon retained some land near Tuross Head, 'Kyla Park', and the original land grant at Kiora.

In time, he would also own land near Mildura, and at Mount Greenock and Dandenong Creek, in the Port Phillip District, later the colony of Victoria.

=== Relations with traditional owners ===
At the time Hawdon was 'taking up' land, the traditional owners of that land were still occupying it. It was the granting of title deeds for the land, to settlers such as Hawdon, that was extinguishing what was later known as native title over that land.

Hawdon seems to have enjoyed friendly relations with the local people. While living at 'Eldersie', he would lend them guns, powder and shot, repaid by the local people with half of the game that they had shot. He praised the friendliness and strict honesty of the local people around Camden, and noted their excellent memories, although—unsurprisingly perhaps for a man noted for his energetic disposition and with the prejudices of the time—he thought that they were 'excessively idle.'

Once Hawdon moved to Kiora, the settlers were living close by the local Yuin people. Local people, having heard Hawdon calling his wife "My dear", also did so, believing that was her true name. Hawdon's barnyard at Kiora was the scene of an inter-communal battle between local 'Moruya' men and 'Braidwood' men, probably both different groups of Yuin. Although the settlers inside the house were frightened by the fighting, they were not involved. The 'Braidwood' men retreated, leaving two wounded in the yard.

Local people also hunted down and, when he refused to come with them, killed an assigned convict, who had escaped from the estate of Duncan Mackellar near Braidwood. The man had travelled cross-country and turned to bushranging, including robbing Hawdons's store building. The local people returned, bringing the man's severed head to Hawdon.

It was local Yuin people, around Moruya, who showed Hawdon the rich well-watered land around Bodalla. It is unlikely that they understood the huge consequences of the Crown Lease that he later obtained over the land, effectively dispossessing Yuin people occupying that land. Hawdon had a brass breastplate made for a Yuin man, Paddy Nurrang, 'King of Bergalia', who died in 1862.

For many years, he employed at least three Aboriginal men as servants—'Mister Campbell', the coach-driver, dressed in black livery, 'Mister Walker', and 'Benson'. It was as if he was recreating an English manor, on the verges of what was, in the eyes of his contemporaries, still a wilderness.

In November 1880, William Benson, a.k.a. Wynoo, formerly an employee of John Hawdon for many years, obtained a 32 acre reserve of Crown Land, on Tuross Lake, for his use for the rest of his lifetime. It was within the traditional land of his own Yuin people. In 1883, there was stated to be five males, three females, and six children living there, with some attending Turlinjah Public School. At some time after his death, in 1917, the reserve was revoked. It is now mainly private land, with a strip of Crown Land on the lakeshore.

=== Colonial magistrate ===
As an early and prominent settler of a remote area, Hawdon became a local magistrate. In the days before Moruya was established, the magistrates sat at nearby Broulee.

Hawdon and William Oldrey had been pivotal in establishing the Broulee bench, effectively the only judicial body south of Wollongong, which was responsible for the coastal area between Batemans Bay and Twofold Bay. The two were embroiled in an ongoing feud with another early settler in the area, Francis Flanagan. That difficulty was later complicated by Flanagan also being appointed a magistrate of the Broulee bench, in April 1844, by Governor Gipps.

Hawdon was not comfortable sentencing escaped convicts; when recaptured, their punishment would be flogging. His attitude was unusual for the colonial magistrates of the time, many of whom—particularly the ex-military officers, such as William Sandys Elrington—seemed unrestrained in handing down harsh sentences. His daughter recalled that, if he suspected the presence of any absconding convicts, he would loudly announce that he would return later, at a particular time, to make a thorough search, allowing them time to slip away discreetly.

=== Slander and assault cases ===
Although he was a magistrate, he was also involved in two legal cases, as the defendant, both of which he lost. The first was in October 1840, when he lost a civil action and had to pay £200 damages for slander. The second was a criminal case of assault.

On 30 January 1844, Hawdon entered the bar of the hotel at Broulee, on horseback. Assisted by three other men—Hawdon's brother-in-law, Mr Potts, another local magistrate, Mr Wason (from Ulladulla), and the Clerk-of-the-Bench, Mr McLean—Hawdon attacked William Oldrey's former superintendent, Richard Bingham Sheridan. Sheridan fled and jumped down a small cliff in front of the hotel. Sheridan appealed to Hawdon to protect him, but Hawdon threw a piece of wood at him instead. Sheridan sought protection with Hawdon's enemy, Francis Flanagan, and laid a charge of assault against Hawdon.

The alleged assault could not be properly investigated nor tried, at Broulee, as the accused, Hawdon, was one of the local magistrates. The next closest bench, at Braidwood, refused to become involved. Sheridan doggedly persisted in seeking justice, and Hawdon was eventually tried—giving evidence by affidavit—and found guilty, by a jury, in the Supreme Court, nearly a year later, on 17 January 1845. He was fined £100, and gave security of £500 and two sureties of £250 each, "to keep the peace for twelve months." The strange episode—somewhat out of character for Hawdon—appears to have been triggered by an argument, about money, between Oldrey and Sheridan at 'Mount Oldrey', earlier on the same day as the assault. There is some indication that alcohol was a factor. The eventual outcome was that Hawdon lost his commission as a magistrate.

Hawdon had another brush with the law, in 1853, when his son Joseph Hawdon was charged with 'furiously riding over a woman'. The police did not prove their case, resulting in Joseph being discharged. However, Hawdon himself was charged with 'attempting to rescue' his son from police custody, and fined 40 shillings.

=== Gold rush ===
On 1 August 1851, it was reported that alluvial gold had been discovered in the bed of the Moruya/Deua River, from a point close to the western boundary of Hawdon's Kiora estate and further upstream. Prospectors soon made far richer finds, further upstream still, on the Deua's tributary. Araluen Creek, and on that creek's tributary, Majors Creek. Around late 1851, Hawden and two of his sons attempted to drain the waterhole at the bottom of a base of the cascade waterfall on Majors Creek, in which they expected to find large nuggets of gold. Later, he provided credit to gold miners needing supplies.

== Family, later life, and death ==
He married Margaret Katherine Potts (1809–1886) at St Peter's Walls End, Northumberland (later Wallsend, Newcastle upon Tyne), in England. They had eight children; John (1827—1848), the only child born in England, Gilbert (1828—1863), who was born at sea, William (1832—1915), Ernest Werge (1834—1892), Joseph (1836—1859), Francis (1838—1919), Elizabeth Anne (1842—1890), and Annie (1844—1941). His first two sons were early students at The King's School, but the younger sons attended Sydney Grammar School.

Hawdon's mother-in-law, Margaret Potts née Werge (1771—1862) followed her only daughter to Australia. His younger brother, Joseph Hawdon (1813—1871), became a pioneering settler of the colony of Victoria, then returned to England, before emigrating once again to the South Island of New Zealand.

Hawdon lived out his last years, in retirement, on his two South Coast landholdings, which after the years of convict assigned labour were used mainly for dairy farming.

In early 1876, he presided, as a highly-regarded 'venerable pioneer', over a dinner at Moruya that was held to celebrate the opening of the first bridge across the Moruya River. He remembered, "when the river bore on its bosom nothing but the canoe of the aboriginal; and its banks had not heard the sound of the bushman's axe, or that of the stockman's whip". He lived in a world transformed irrevocably, especially for the dispossessed Yuin people, in just over four decades of his lifetime.

Hawdon's younger brother, William, had taken over the running of the family farm in England upon his father's death in 1845. William's two surviving sons did not follow him into farming. William died in 1879 and, about this time, Hawdon made a visit to England, possibly to wind up the family's farming interests there. He returned to New South Wales in 1880, thereby severing a family connection to the area around Wackerfield that reportedly dated from the Elizabethan era.

Hawdon died at Kiora, near Moruya, on 12 June 1881. His wife died on 28 October 1886, in Moruya. They lie in the old Kiora (private) cemetery, with five of their children, among a total of 26 grave sites. His eldest son John lies, far away, in Mildura, one of the first settlers to be buried there.

== Legacy ==
Hawdon's letters are held in the collection of the State Library of New South Wales. His long-lived youngest daughter Annie Wilson, was able to recollect details of life in the early times, which were reported in the early 20th-century.

Hawdon Street and Hawdon Place in the Canberra suburb of Downer, are named after both Hawdon and his brother Joseph Hawdon.

His legacies include the townships of Moruya and Broulee. Although he founded neither in person, he did much that led to their establishment. The blacksmith's forge, the mill, tailor's and shoemaker's shops, and the other trades, which Hawdon brought to the district when he settled at Kiora, became the nucleus of the town of Moruya. His role in the formation of that town is his most lasting legacy. Hawdon Street in Moruya is named after him.

His property, near Tuross Head, 'Kyla Park'—owned by Hawdon family descendants, until 1970—is remembered by the name of a street and a recreation reserve in Tuross Head. Some of the property itself has been developed for housing. A rural portion is preserved, for use as grazing land or for other semi-rural uses, under a local heritage management plan.

His other home, 'Kiora House', at Kiora, still stands, overlooking the town of Moruya, which lies to the east on the opposite side of the river. It has been described as “arguably the most sophisticated early house built in the region.” The words, “Annie Hawdon on 26th Feb 1865” that she scratched into a window pane of the house, with her diamond ring, at her wedding reception, still survive.

== See also ==
- Joseph Hawdon (younger brother)
- William Oldrey (fellow magistrate and early settler of Broulee)
