= Deua River Valley =

- Town
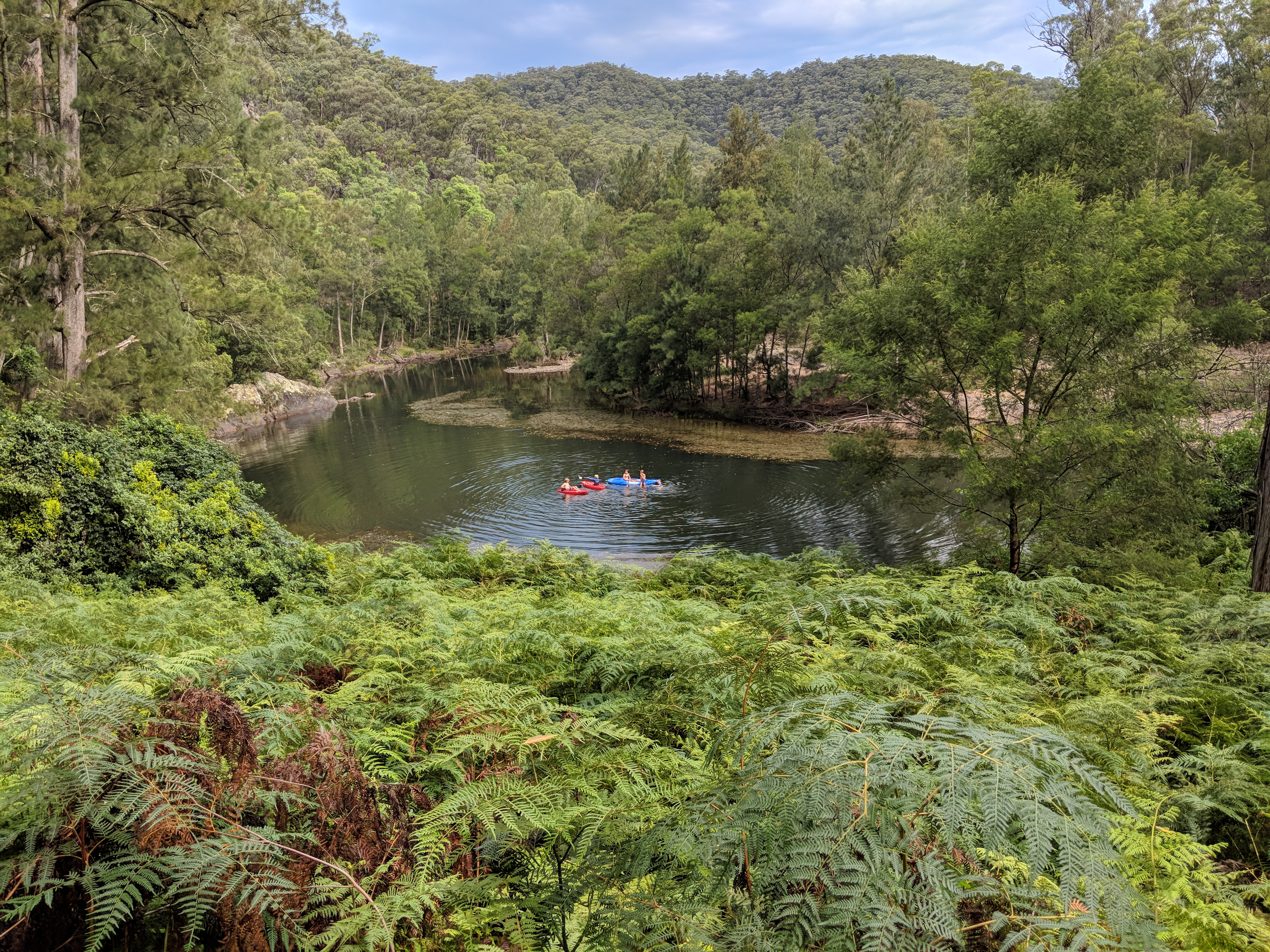
- Deua River

- Coordinates: 35°46′25″S 149°56′32″E
- Country: Australia
- State: New South Wales
- Region: South Coast
- LGA: Eurobodalla Shire
- Location: 20 km (12 mi) NW of Moruya

Government
  - State electorate: Bega
  - Federal division: Gilmore

Population
  - Total: 76 (2016 census)
- Postcode: 2622
- County: Dampier
- Parish: Merricumbene
Localities around Deua River Valley
Merricumbene	Buckenbowra	Buckenbowra
Deua	Deua River Valley	Mogendoura
Deua	Wamban	Kiora

Deua River Valley is a locality in the Eurobodalla Shire, New South Wales, Australia. It is located about 20 km northwest of Moruya on the road to Araluen in the valley of the Deua River. At the 2016 census, it had a population of 76. Much of its territory lies in the Deua National Park.

A school was located at Deua River Upper from 1883 to 1893, described as a "half-time school", except in its first year when it was a "provisional" school. Another "half-time school" was located at Deua River from 1887 to 1897. Another school was located at Deua River Lower from 1889 to 1893, described as "House to House" during its first 1.5 years and subsequently as a "half-time school".
