= Merricumbene =

- Town
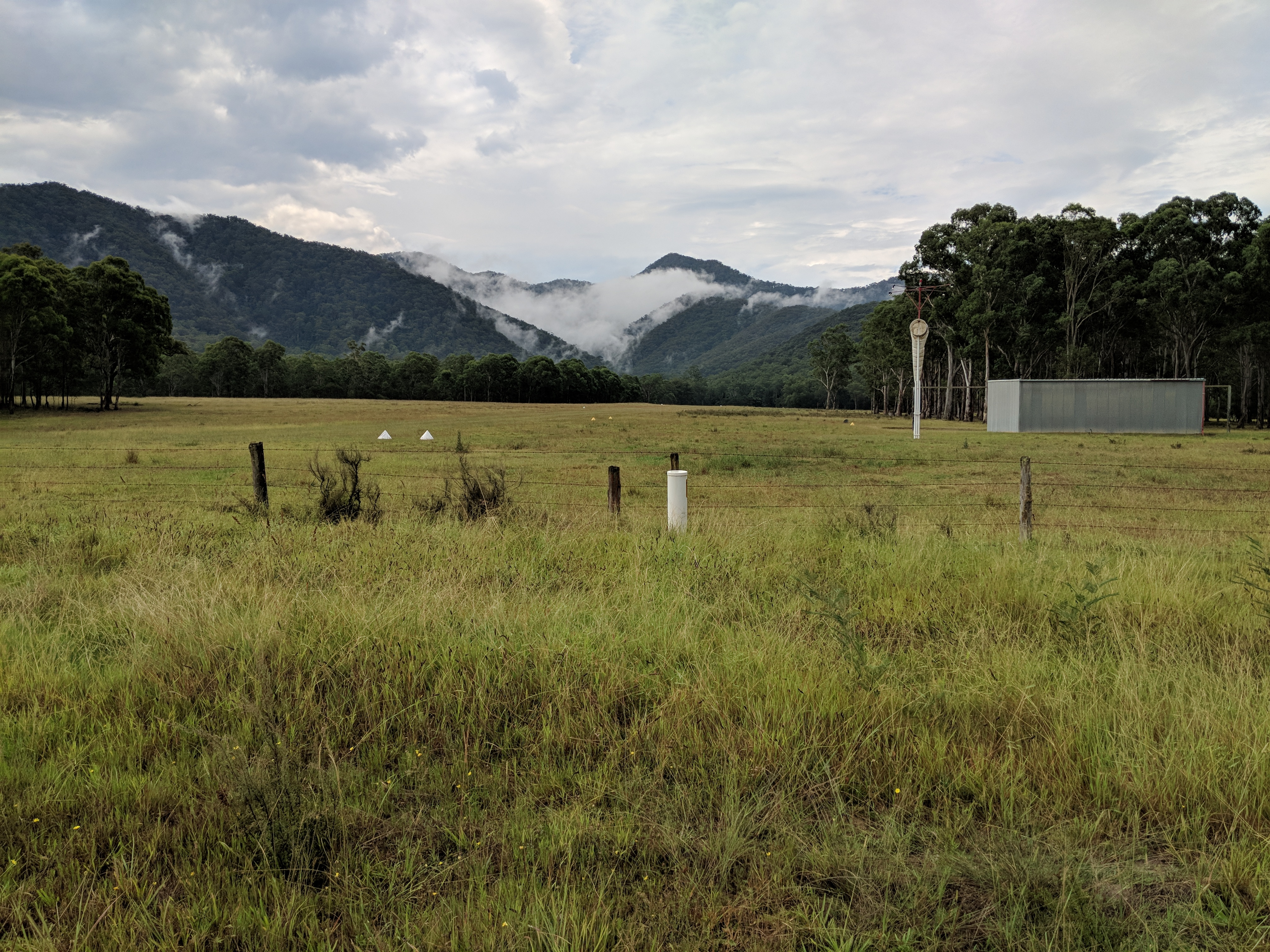
- Merricumbene air strip

- Coordinates: 35°44′03″S 149°53′43″E
- Country: Australia
- State: New South Wales
- Region: South Coast
- LGA: Eurobodalla Shire
- Location: 43 km (27 mi) S of Braidwood; 40 km (25 mi) NW of Moruya

Government
  - State electorate: Bega
  - Federal division: Gilmore

Population
  - Total: 14 (SAL 2021)
- Postcode: 2622
- County: Dampier
- Parish: Merricumbene
Localities around Merricumbene
Araluen	Monga National Park	Buckenbowra
Neringla	Merricumbene	Buckenbowra
Neringla	Deua River Valley	Deua River Valley

Merricumbene is a locality in the Eurobodalla Shire, New South Wales, Australia. It is located about 43 km south of Braidwood and 40 km northwest of Moruya in the valley of the Deua River. At the 2016 census, it had a population of 19.

The area now known as Merricumbene lies on the traditional lands of Yuin people. The National Museum of Australia has a breastplate made by settlers, around 1845, for "Timothy, Chief of Merricumbene".

The locality was site of gold mining and there was a mining village of the same name. Alluvial gold mining appears to have begun around March 1859. The Moruya or Deua River Goldfield was proclaimed on 31 August 1865. A number of small portions of land exist on both sides of the river, indicating that the mining settlement occupied both banks of the river, over a significant length, below the confluence of the river with Araluen Creek. Gold reefs were mined briefly, in the area, during 1911. A gold dredge was working at Merricumbene in 1901. A later dredge commenced operation in the river, in December 1912, but it was overturned by floodwater in June 1913.

It had a "half-time" school from 1893 to 1904. In its early days, Merricumbene's only road connection—such as it was—was via Araluen; from 1858, there was a pack-horse route to the coastal plain at Moruya. Araluen and Merricumbene were later connected to Moruya, by the Araluen Road, constructed in 1867-1868. Merricumbene has a cemetery.
