= Bettowynd Creek =

Coordinates: 35°42′S 149°48′E

- Etymology: Aboriginal: a place where water lilies abound

Location
- Country: Australia
- State: New South Wales
- Region: South East Corner (IBRA), Southern Tablelands
- Local government area: Queanbeyan–Palerang

Physical characteristics
- Source: below Benmanang Range, Great Dividing Range
  - location: near Majors Creek
  - elevation: 430 m (1,410 ft)
- Mouth: confluence with the Deua River
  - location: south of Monga National Park
  - elevation: 104 m (341 ft)
- Length: 16 km (9.9 mi)

Basin features
- River system: Moruya River catchment
- National park: Monga NP

Bettowynd Creek, a partly perennial stream of the Moruya River catchment, is located in the Southern Tablelands and South Coast regions of New South Wales, Australia.

== Course and features ==
Bettowynd Creek rises below Benmanang Range, about 14 kilometres (8.7 mi) south southwest of the village of Majors Creek, on the eastern slopes of the Great Dividing Range. The river flows generally northeast and then southeast before reaching its confluence with the Deua River in remote country south of the Monga National Park. The river descends 311 metres (1,020 ft) over its 16 kilometres (9.9 mi) course.

== See also ==
- Rivers of New South Wales
- List of rivers of New South Wales (A-K)
- List of rivers of Australia
