= Kiora =

- Town
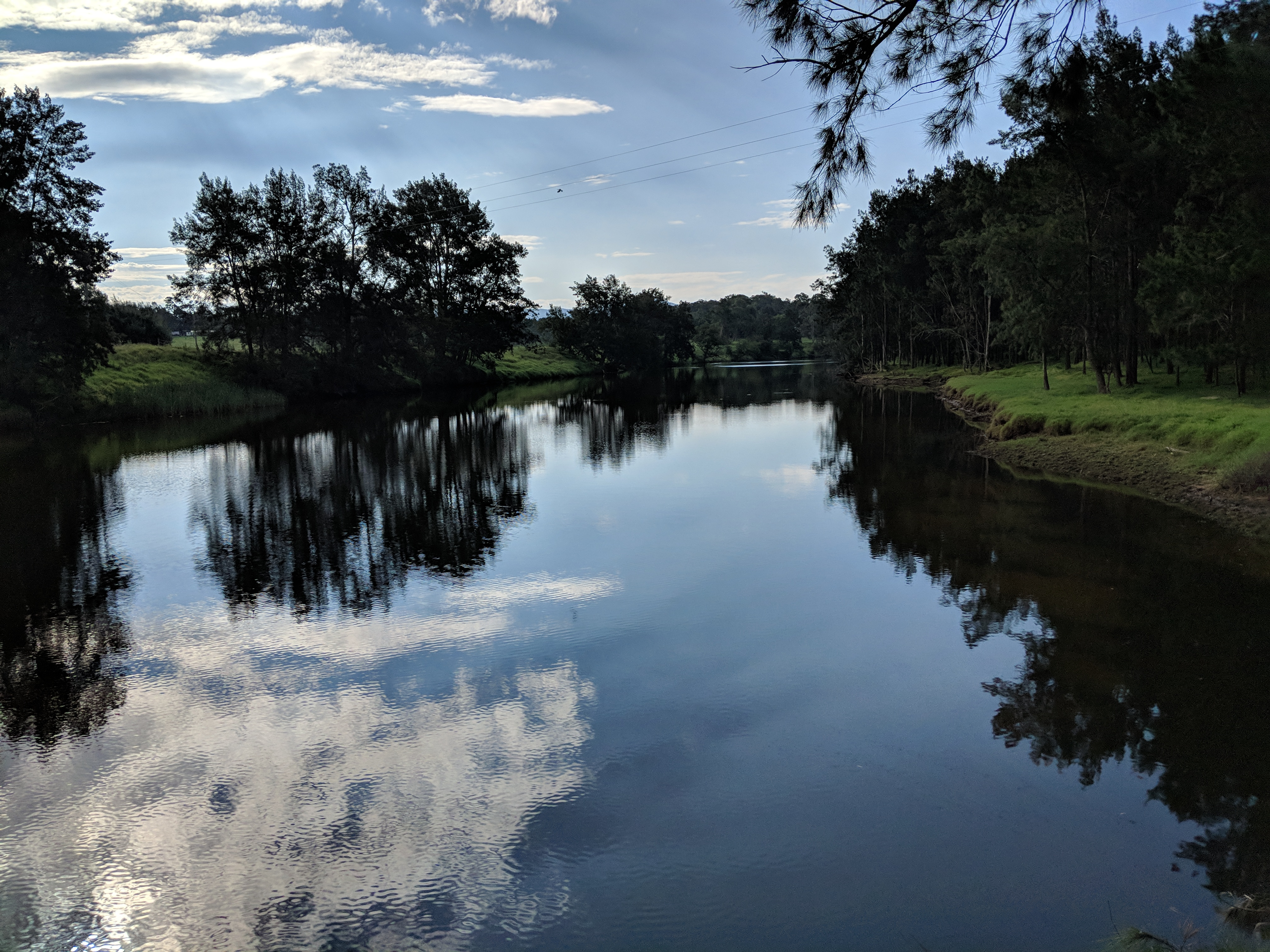
- Deua or Moruya River at Kiora Bridge

- Coordinates: 35°54′21″S 150°00′51″E
- Country: Australia
- State: New South Wales
- Region: South Coast
- LGA: Eurobodalla Shire
- Location: 11 km (6.8 mi) W of Moruya

Government
  - State electorate: Bega
  - Federal division: Gilmore

Population
  - Total: 47 (SAL 2021)
- Postcode: 2537
- County: Dampier
- Parish: Mogendoura
Localities around Kiora
Deua River Valley	Mogendoura	Moruya
Wamban	Kiora	Moruya
Wamban	Wamban	Moruya

Kiora is a locality in the Eurobodalla Shire, New South Wales, Australia. It is located about 11 km west of Moruya on the road to Araluen at the point where the Deua River becomes estuarine and changes its name to the Moruya River. At the 2016 census, it had a population of 54. Its name derives from the Kiora House, which belonged to John Hawdon. It had a public school from 1868 to 1928.
