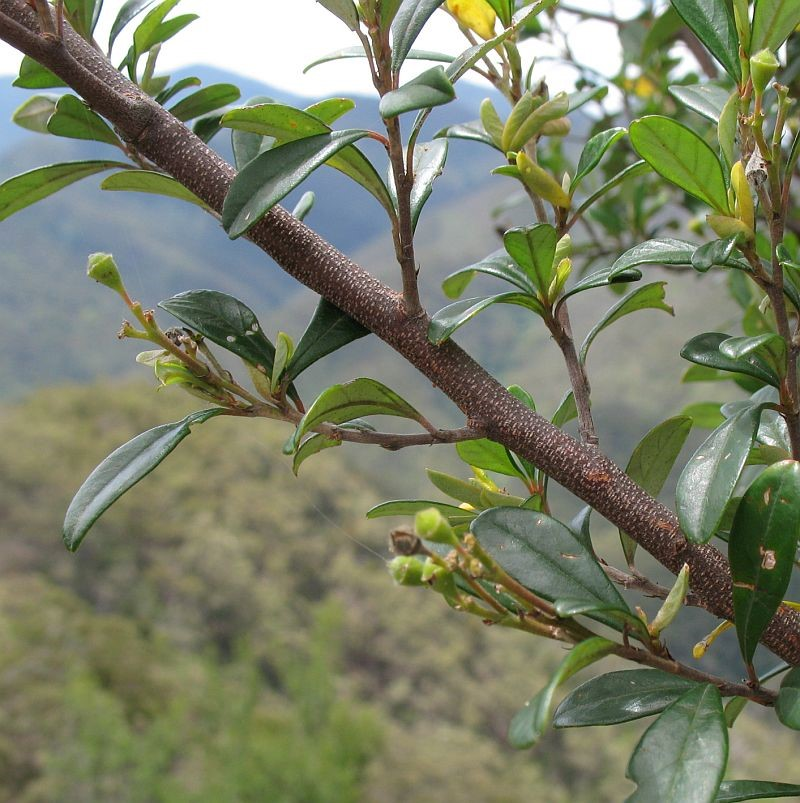
- Pomaderris gilmourii var. gilmourii in Deua National Park

Scientific classification
- Kingdom: Plantae
- Clade: Tracheophytes
- Clade: Angiosperms
- Clade: Eudicots
- Clade: Rosids
- Order: Rosales
- Family: Rhamnaceae
- Genus: Pomaderris
- Species: P. gilmourii

Binomial name
- Pomaderris gilmourii N.G.Walsh

= Pomaderris gilmourii =

Species of shrub

Pomaderris gilmourii is a species of flowering plant in the family Rhamnaceae and is endemic to Deua National Park in New South Wales. It is a shrub with hairy young stems, egg-shaped to elliptic leaves, and clusters of silvery buds and creamy-yellow flowers.

== Description ==
Pomaderris gilmourii is a shrub that typically grows to a height of up to 4 m (13 ft), its young stems hairy. The leaves are egg-shaped or lance-shaped with the narrower end towards the base or narrowly elliptic, 8–30 mm (0.31–1.18 in) long and 4–13 mm (0.16–0.51 in) wide on a petiole 2–8 mm (0.079–0.315 in) long with stipules up to 4 mm (0.16 in) long at the base but that fall off as the leaf develops. The upper surface of the leaves is more or less glabrous and the lower surface densely covered with star-shaped or simple hairs. The flowers are borne in panicles 20–50 mm (0.79–1.97 in) in diameter on the ends of branchlets, each flower on a pedicel 1–4 mm (0.039–0.157 in) long. The sepals are oblong, cream-coloured or yellow with silvery hairs on the back and there are no petals.

== Taxonomy ==
Pomaderris gilmourii was first formally described in 1989 by Neville Grant Walsh in the journal Muelleria from specimens he collected in Deua National Park in 1987. The specific epithet (gilmourii) honours "Mr Phil. Gilmour, formerly of Canberra who first collected this species".

In the same journal, Walsh described two varieties and the names are accepted by the Australian Plant Census:

- Pomaderris gilmourii var. cana N.G.Walsh, commonly known as grey Deua pomaderris, that has leaves with a dull lower surface, foliage without a dense layer of woolly hairs, and leaves without a distinct, thickened edge on the lower surface;
- Pomaderris gilmourii N.G.Walsh var. gilmourii N.G.Walsh that has a dense, shiny layer of simple hairs on the lower surface of the leaves petioles and branchlets, and a distinct, thickened on the edges of the lower surface of the leaves.

== Distribution and habitat ==
This pomaderris grows in shrubland or forest on rhyolite outcrops in Deua National Park, inland from Moruya.

== Conservation status ==
Pomaderris gilmourii var. cana is listed as "vulnerable" under the Australian Government Environment Protection and Biodiversity Conservation Act 1999 and the New South Wales Government Biodiversity Conservation Act 2016 (previously the Threatened Species Conservation Act 1995.
