= Majors Creek =

Majors Creek may refer to:

- Majors Creek, New South Wales, a village in the Southern Tablelands Region, Australia
- Majors Creek (New South Wales), a watercourse that is a tributary of Araluen Creek, in the Southern Tablelands Region, Australia
- Majors Creek, Queensland, a locality split between the City of Townsville and the Shire of Burdekin, Australia
- Majors Creek (Alabama), a river of Alabama, United States
