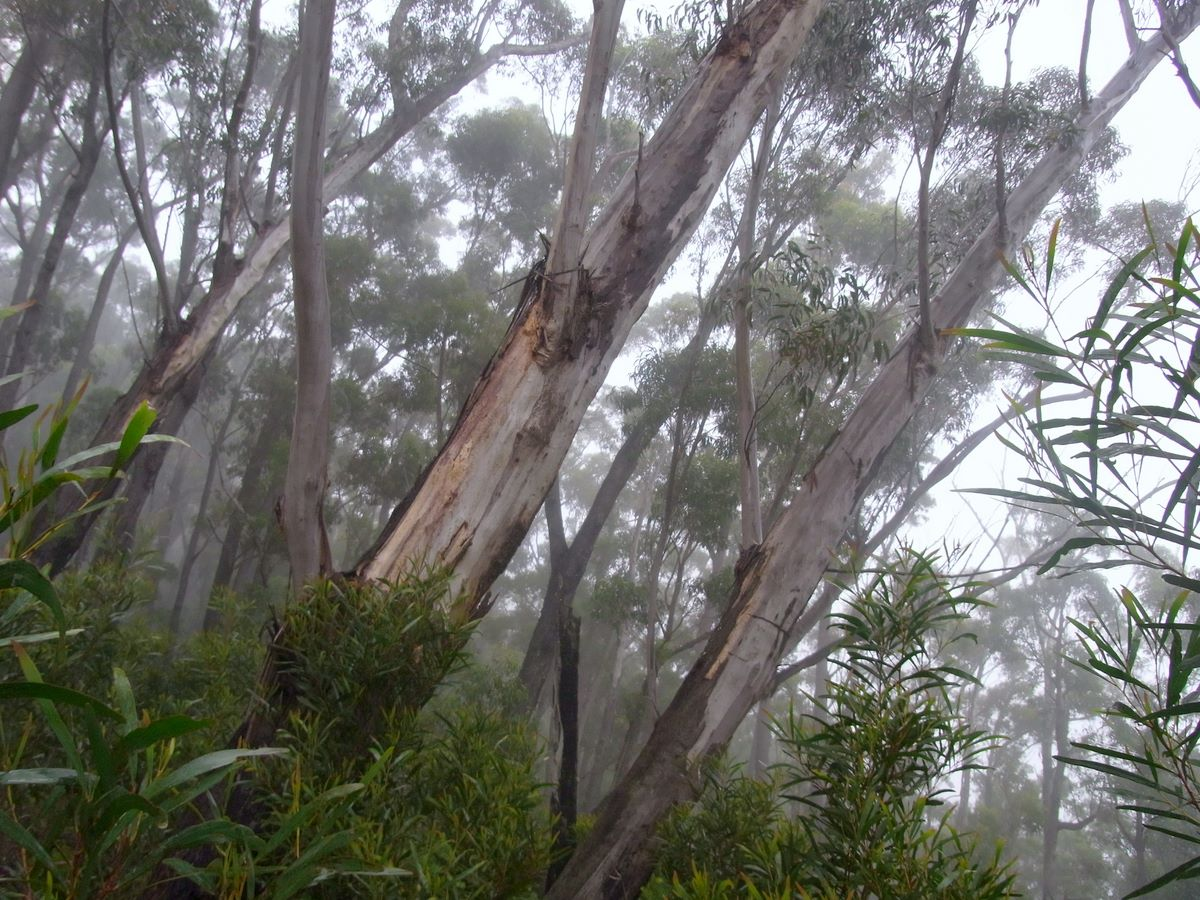
- Jilliga ash, Deua National Park, Australia

Conservation status
- Endangered (EPBC Act)

Scientific classification
- Kingdom: Plantae
- Clade: Tracheophytes
- Clade: Angiosperms
- Clade: Eudicots
- Clade: Rosids
- Order: Myrtales
- Family: Myrtaceae
- Genus: Eucalyptus
- Species: E. stenostoma

Binomial name
- Eucalyptus stenostoma L.A.S.Johnson & Blaxell

= Eucalyptus stenostoma =

Jillaga ash

Species of eucalyptus

Eucalyptus stenostoma, commonly known as the Jillaga ash, is a small to medium-sized tree, endemic to a restricted part of New South Wales. It has rough, fissured bark on the lower trunk, smooth creamy white bark above, lance-shaped adult leaves, flower buds in groups of thirteen to nineteen or more, white flowers and spherical fruit with a small opening.

== Description ==
Eucalyptus stenostoma is a tree that typically grows to a height of 25 m (82 ft), often with a leaning trunk, and forms a lignotuber. The bark on the lower trunk is rough, fissured, shortly fibrous and greyish black, the bark above smooth, white or yellow with insect scribbles and is shed in ribbons. Young plants and coppice regrowth have leaves that are green to greyish, slightly paler on the lower surface, egg-shaped to lance-shaped, up to 180 mm (7.1 in) long and 60 mm (2.4 in) wide. Adult leaves are arranged alternately, glossy green, lance-shaped to curved, 90–1,950 mm (3.5–76.8 in) long and 10–30 mm (0.39–1.18 in) wide on a petiole 10–20 mm (0.39–0.79 in) long. The flower buds are arranged in leaf axils in groups of thirteen to nineteen or more on an unbranched peduncle 15–30 mm (0.59–1.18 in) long, the individual buds on pedicels 4–10 mm (0.16–0.39 in) long. Mature buds are oval, 5–6 mm (0.20–0.24 in) long and 3–4 mm (0.12–0.16 in) wide with a conical to rounded operculum. Flowering occurs in summer and the flowers are white. The fruit is a woody, spherical glaucous capsule 7–12 mm (0.28–0.47 in) long and 6–12 mm (0.24–0.47 in) wide with the valves enclosed below the rim.

== Taxonomy and naming ==
Eucalyptus stenostoma was first formally described in 1972 by Lawrie Johnson and Donald Blaxell in Contributions from the New South Wales Herbarium. The type specimens were collected in 1965 by David John Hynd (born 1937), near the head of the Tuross River north-west of Nerrigundah. The specific epithet (stenostoma) is from ancient Greek words meaning "narrow" and "opening", referring to the opening of the fruit.

== Distribution and habitat ==
Jillaga ash grows only in the catchment areas of the Tuross and Deua Rivers, in steeply sloping dry woodland on relatively infertile soils. Rare and difficult to locate, however, it is locally abundant in some sites.

== Conservation status ==
Eucalyptus stenostoma is classified as "endangered" under the Australian Government Environment Protection and Biodiversity Conservation Act 1999.

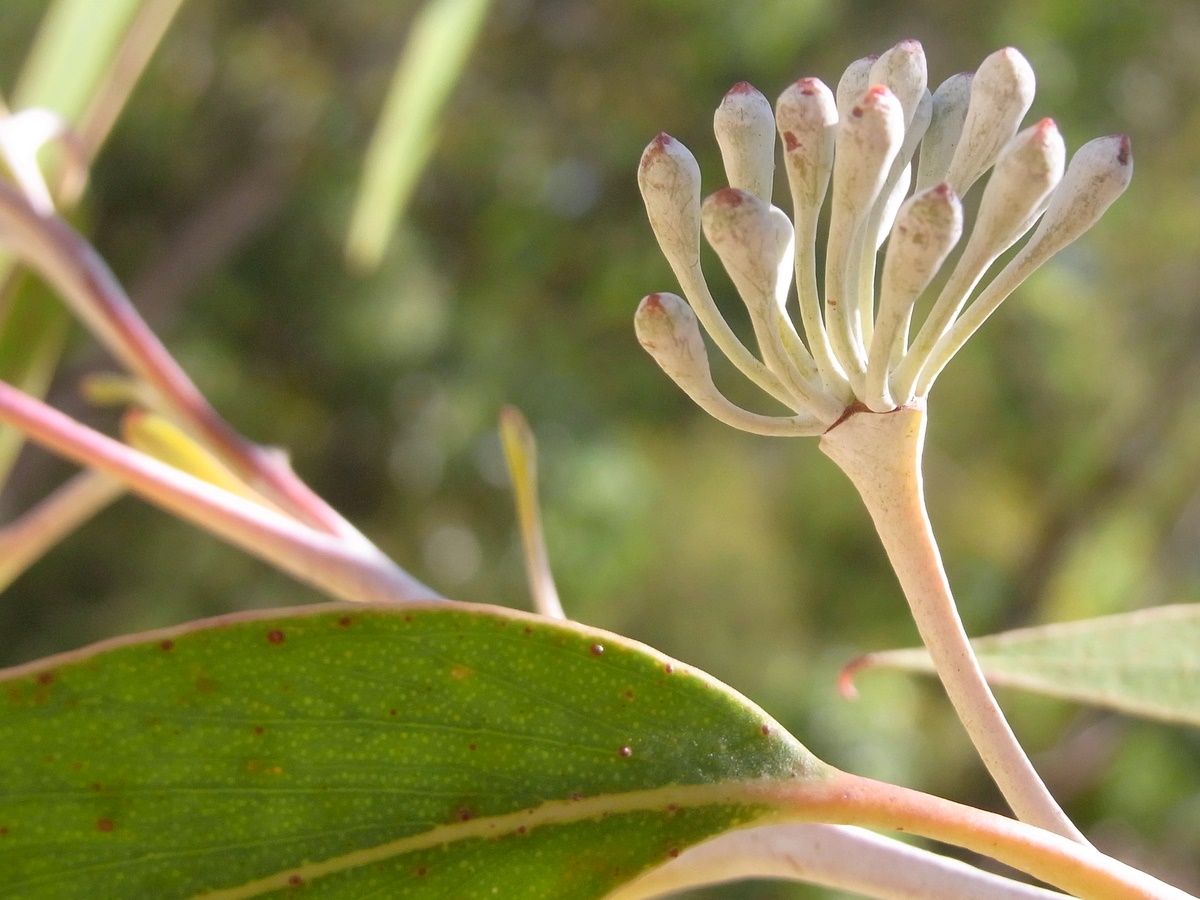
Flower buds

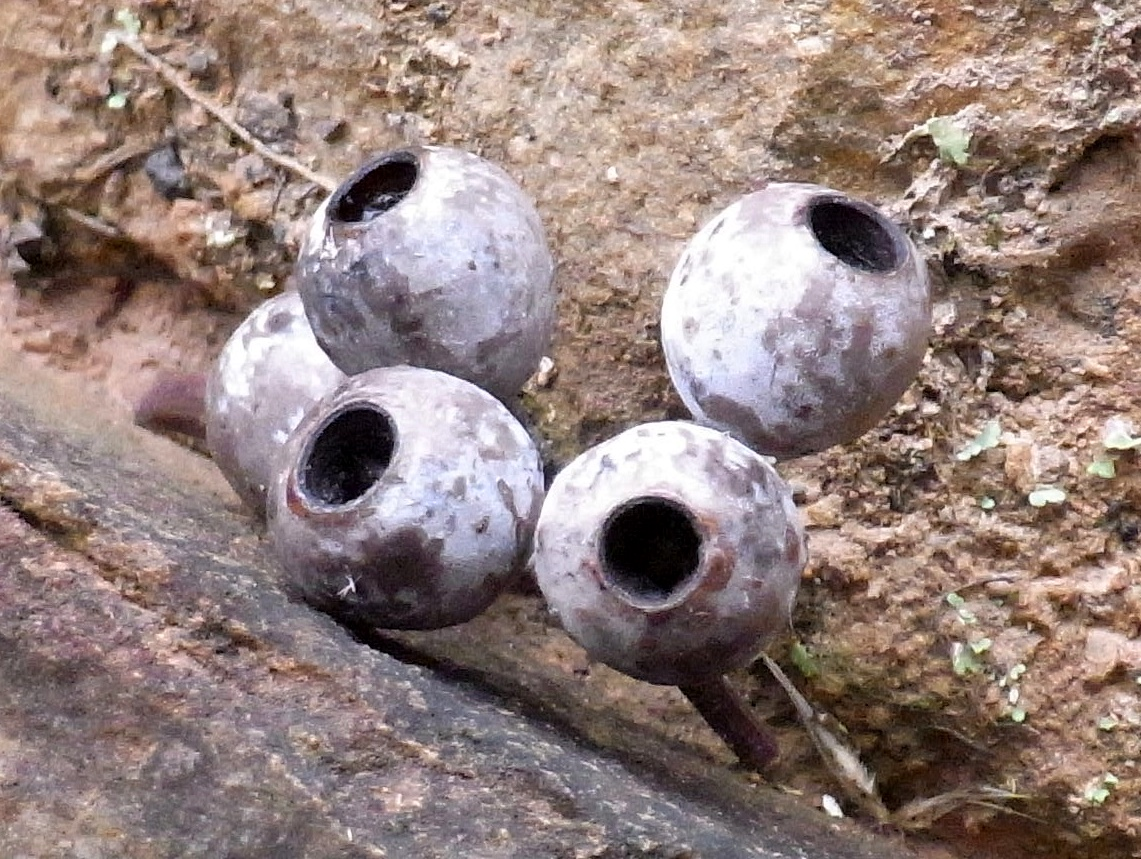
Glaucous fruit

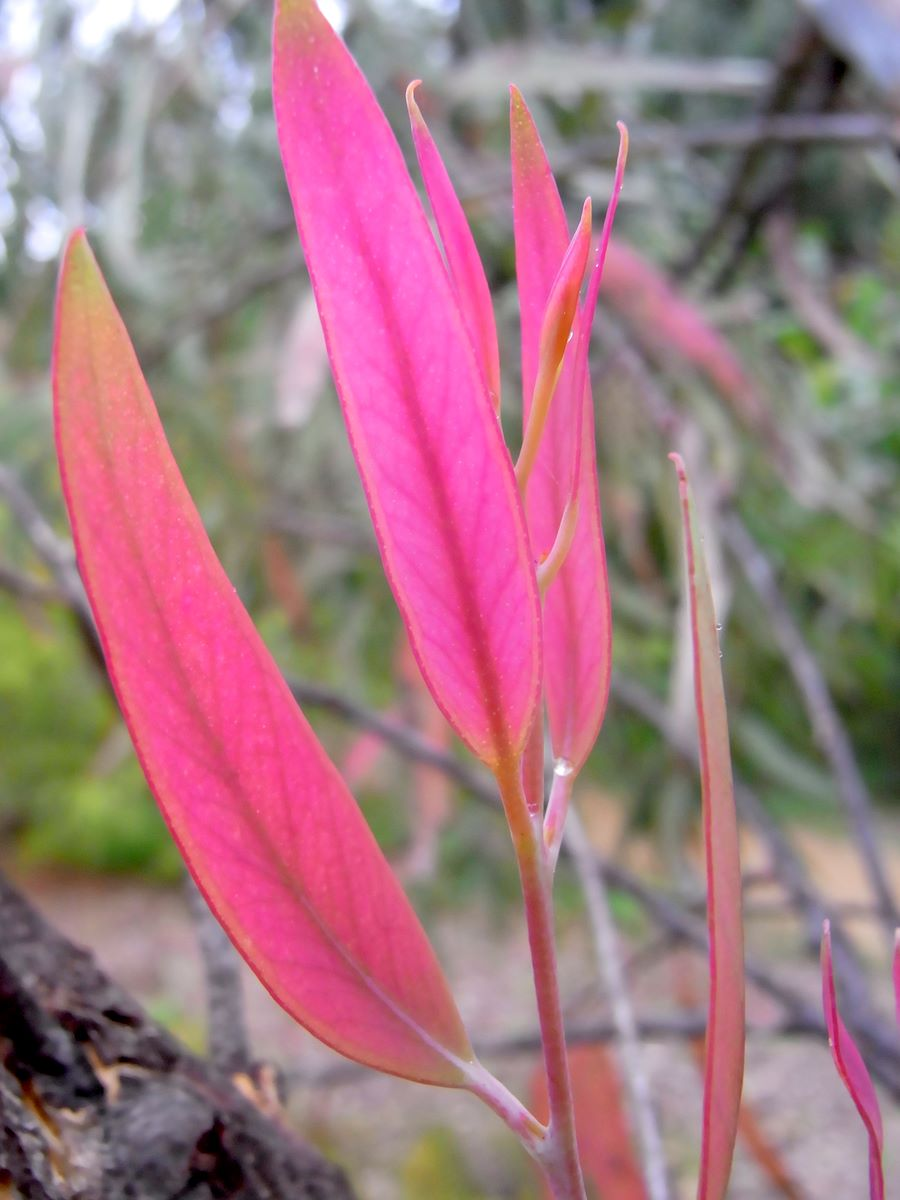
Immature red leaves
