= Banyule Homestead =

Heritage-listed homestead in Melbourne, Victoria, Australia

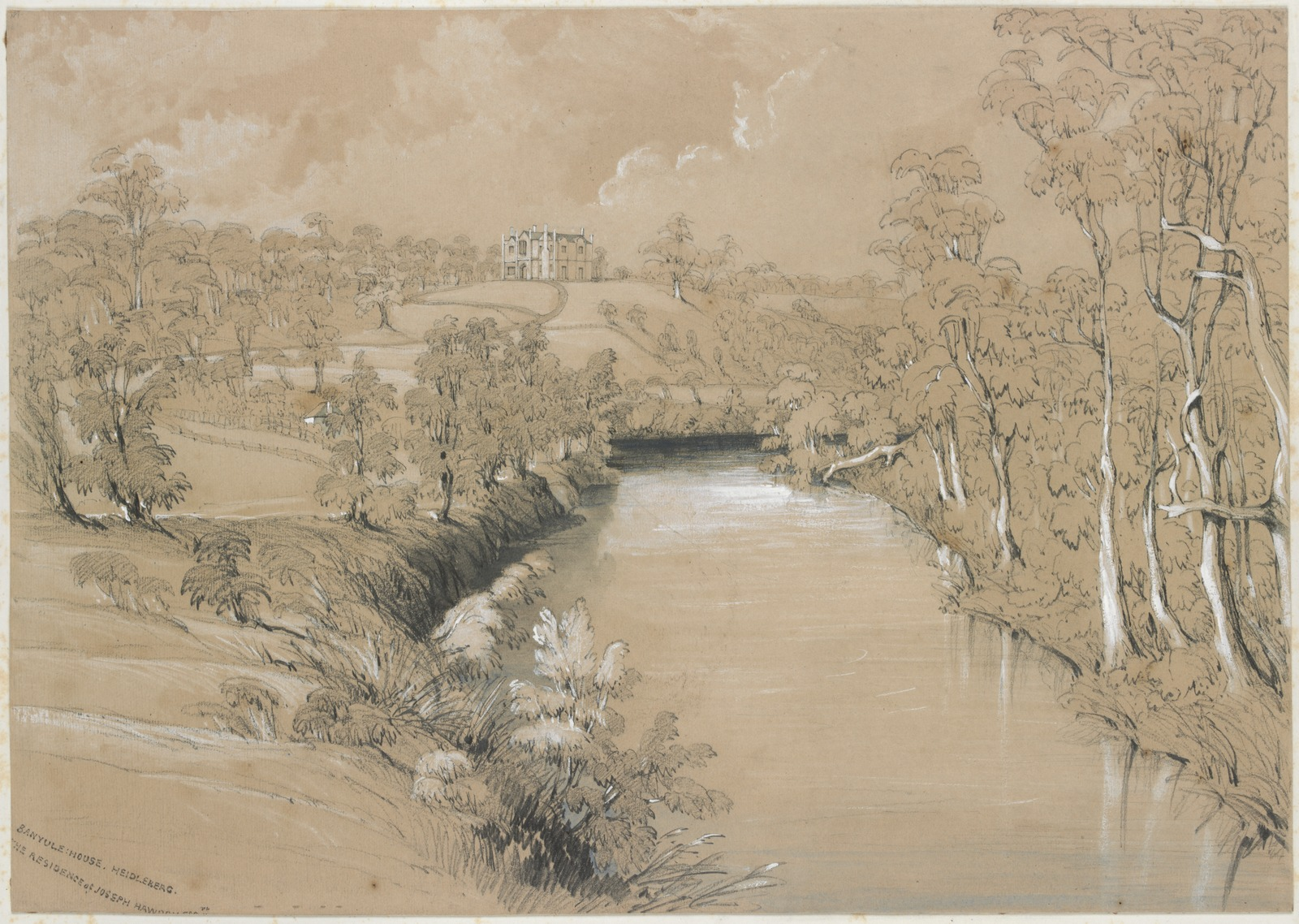
- A c. 1849 etching of the homestead by the Yarra

- Location of the homestead in Greater Metropolitan Melbourne
- Interactive map of the Banyule Homestead area
- Alternative names: Banyule

General information
- Status: Completed
- Type: Homestead
- Architectural style: Elizabethan Old Colonial Gothic Revival
- Location: 60 Buckingham Drive, Heidelberg, Yarra Ranges, Melbourne, Victoria, Australia
- Coordinates: 37°44′53″S 145°05′01″E
- Completed: 1846; 180 years ago
- Renovated: 1908; 1975–1977
- Client: Joseph Hawdon

Technical details
- Material: Rendered bricks; sandstone; shingles; slate
- Grounds: 263 ha (650 acres) (1896); 9,100 m^{2} (98,000 sq ft) (2019)

Design and construction
- Architect: John Gill

Renovating team
- Renovating firm: Klingender & Alsop (1908); Yuncken Freeman (1977)

Victorian Heritage Register
- Official name: Banyule Homestead
- Type: Registered place
- Designated: 9 October 1974
- Reference no.: H0926
- Heritage overlay no.: HO13
- Category: Residential buildings (private)

Register of the National Estate
- Official name: Banyule Homestead
- Type: Defunct register
- Designated: 21 March 1978
- Reference no.: 5613

The Banyule Homestead, more commonly known as Banyule, is a heritage-listed homestead located at 60 Buckingham Drive, Heidelberg, in the northern suburbs of Melbourne, Victoria, Australia.

Built in 1846 on the traditional lands of the Wurundjeri people, the homestead was added to the Victorian Heritage Register on 9 October 1974 in recognition of its historical and architectural significance; and was also added to the non-statutory and now defunct Register of the National Estate on 21 March 1978, and a non-statutory local government list on an unknown date.

== History ==
Banyule was built in 1846 for Joseph Hawdon to a design by John Gill, a colonial architect. Hawdon was an Englishman who came to Australia in 1834, and in 1836 joined John Gardiner and John Hepburn to be among the first to overland cattle from New South Wales to Port Phillip. Hawdon settled in Port Phillip and became prominent in local affairs and in colonial society.

In 1845, Hawdon commissioned Gill, a prominent Melbourne architect of the 1840s and 1850s, to design a house on land overlooking the Yarra at Heidelberg, set on 263 hectares (650 acres). Heidelberg in the 1840s was a desirable location for the rural retreats of the colonial gentry, including Robert Martin, Thomas Wills, and R. H. Browne.

Gill designed several houses in medieval styles, and Banyule is his only known house completed in the Elizabethan Old Colonial Gothic Revival style, which was more common in Sydney than in Melbourne at the time. Subsequent residents of note at Banyule included James Graham, William Mitchell and Dr Robert Martin. Graham and his wife developed an extensive garden on the site in the 1860s.

By the 1890s, the homestead was situated on 300 hectares (750 acres) and was developed as a dairy farm during the 1940s. During the 1950s and 1960s, the homestead was extensively subdivided as part of a residential estate, amid some controversy.

=== Recent history ===
From 1975 to 1977, the house was altered to provide a gallery space for the National Gallery of Victoria's Heidelberg School Collection. The property was subsequently sold and returned into private hands in 1995, purchased for A$815,000. A 2011 proposal to subdivide the property received significant criticism. The owner listed the property for sale in 2014, and was eventually sold in 2017 in an unrenovated condition for A$5.2 million. An application by its new owners to Banyule City Council in 2017 to convert the property into a function centre was contested by the community, Banyule Estate Residents Group and the Heidelberg Historical Society. This application was rejected, as was a later appeal. Subsequently renovated, the eight-bedroom 9,100-square-metre (98,000 sq ft) property was sold again in 2019 for an undisclosed price.

In 2015, the house was a setting for The Ex-PM, a comedic mini-series written by and stared Shaun Micallef.

== Description ==
Banyule is a two-storey house of rendered brick on sandstone footings. The roof was originally at least partly shingled, replaced by slate by 1867. Banyule is predominantly Elizabethan in style, and its Flemish gables, crenellated oriel, pepper-pot pinnacles and chimney groups result in a most picturesque skyline. The 1846 house had three main rooms asymmetrically arranged on the ground floor and a fine staircase leading to the six rooms on the first floor. Gothic forms were used for interior details such as mantelpieces, cornices, doors and architraves. The detached two-roomed kitchen block to the north-east might have been built in c. 1843, before the main house. In 1908 there were major additions, designed by the architects Klingender & Alsop: a two-storey wing, in a style sympathetic to the original, was added to the south-east, and on the north side the kitchen block was linked to the house. In 1922 repair work was done under the supervision of A & K Henderson. In 1975–1977 the house was altered by Yuncken Freeman Architects for use by the National Gallery of Victoria. This involved the removal of internal walls and doors, filling in of fireplaces, and the removal of a chimney. It is now again a private residence.

The grounds have been reduced in size, and later development, including the building of a tennis court and swimming pool, has altered the landscape. Remnants of the early garden planting, including cypress trees, paths and walls remain. The main feature of the garden is a very large and prominent Blue Atlas Cedar, (Cedrus atlantica f. glauca) in the front garden.

== See also ==
- Architecture of Melbourne
- List of places on the Victorian Heritage Register in the City of Banyule
