= Wackerfield =

Hamlet in County Durham, England

Coordinates: 54°36′1″N 1°45′51″W

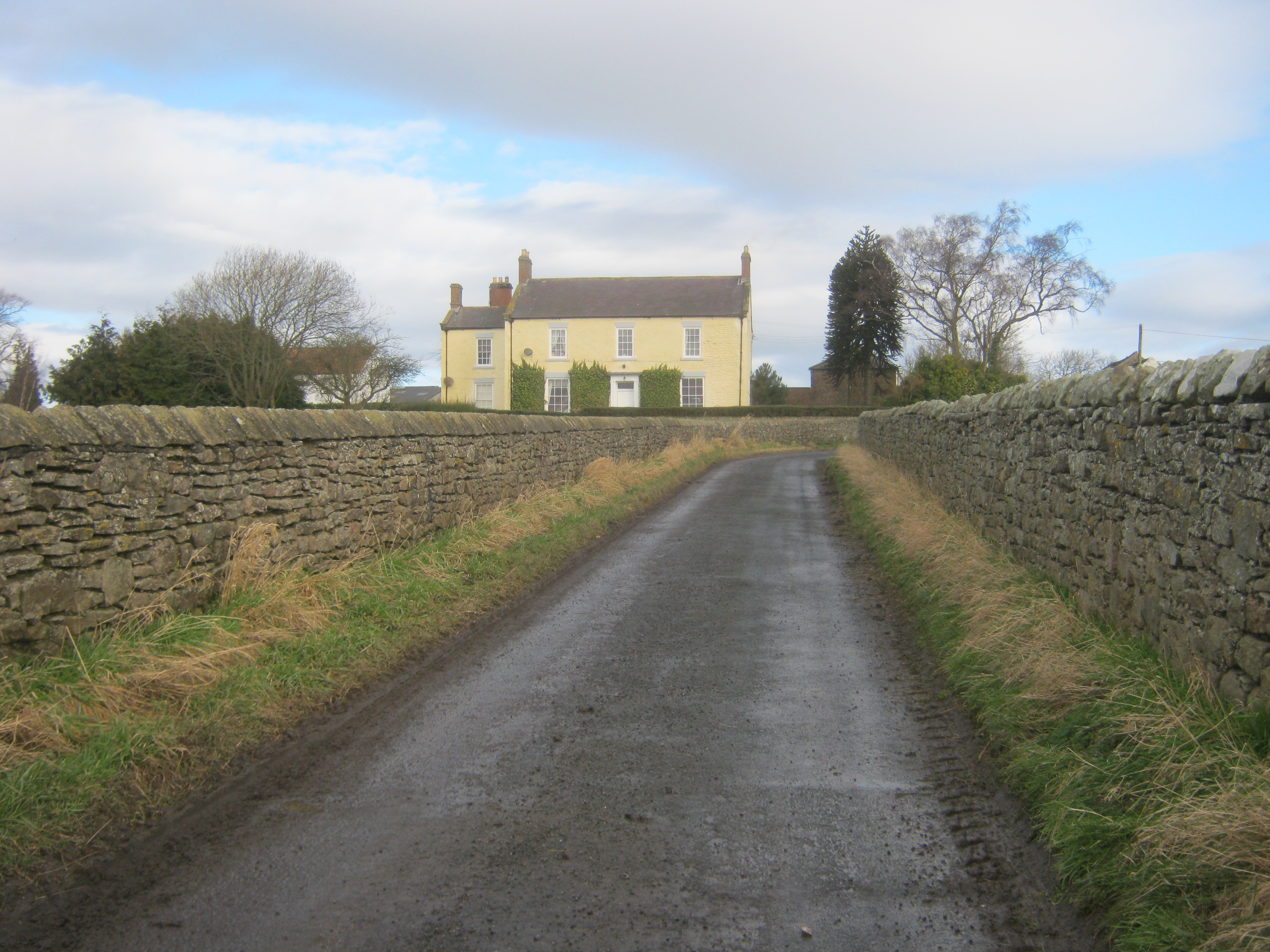
- Wakerfield Hall

- Location within County Durham
- Population: 60 (2021 census)
- Civil parish: Wackerfield
- Unitary authority: County Durham
- Ceremonial county: Durham
- Region: North East
- Country: England
- Sovereign state: United Kingdom
- Police: Durham
- Fire: County Durham and Darlington
- Ambulance: North East

Wackerfield is a hamlet and civil parish in County Durham, in England. It is situated to the north west of Darlington. At the 2021 Census the population was 60.

Listed buildings in Wackerfield include the Grade II listed Wackerfield Hall.

== See also ==
- John Hawdon (colonial settler)
- Joseph Hawdon
