= Joseph Hawdon =

New Zealand politician (1813–1871)

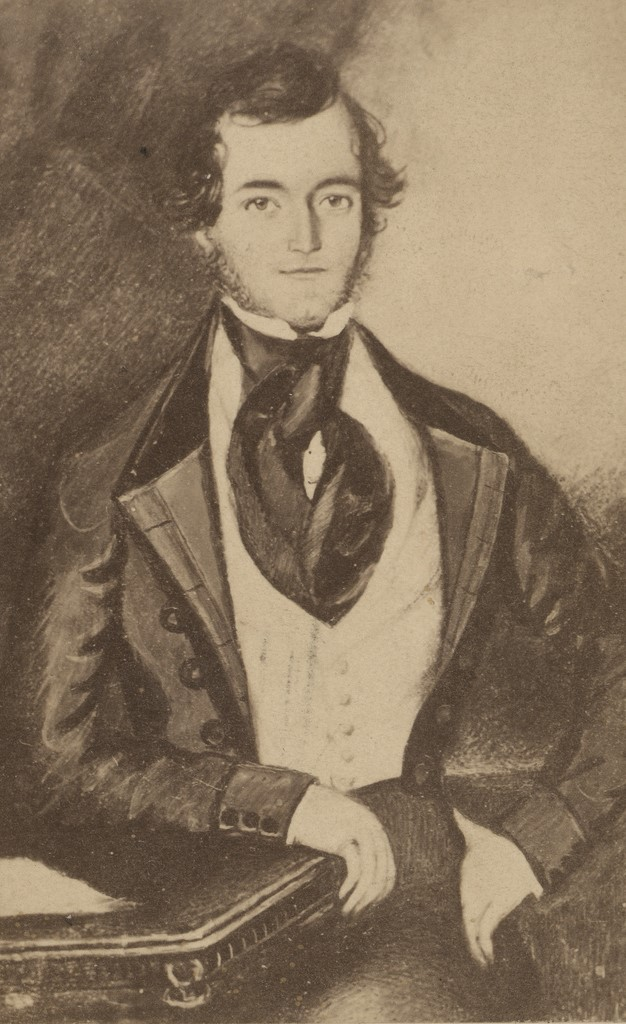

Joseph Hawdon (14 November 1813 – 12 April 1871) was an English-born colonial Australian pioneer settler and overlander, and a colonial New Zealand pioneer and politician.

== Early life ==
Hawdon was born at Wackerfield, Durham, England, the son of John Hawdon. At the suggestion of his elder brother John Hawdon (1801–1881) who had arrived in Sydney in 1828, he decided to travel to Australia, arriving at Sydney in November 1834.

== Australia ==
Following the course of the Murray River, along the route they found two fine lakes – Lake Victoria, in the western Riverina region of New South Wales, and Lake Bonney in north-eastern South Australia. Hawdon named the first after Queen Victoria and the second after his companion. Charles Sturt.

Having beaten other aspiring overlanders, including John Hill and Edward John Eyre, Hawdon and Lieutenant Alfred Mundy left Melbourne on an expedition to Adelaide on 11 July 1839, travelling north-north-west to Expedition Pass, near present-day Castlemaine, and stopping at various squatter stations. They reached the Hentys' station near Casterton on 25 July, camped at Lake Mundy (a freshwater lake which Holloway named after Hawdon's companion) on 27 July, and then followed the tracks of the Holloway party, which they caught on 2 August. Travelling close to the coast through The Coorong, they crossed the Murray on 8 August and arrived in Adelaide on 11 August.

In 1846, Hawdon commissioned the construction of the Banyule, a homestead overlooking the Yarra River, in Heidelberg, and he remained in Victoria until 1858, and then returned to England.

== New Zealand ==
Hawdon River and Lake Hawdon are named after him.

== Personal life ==
He married in 1842 Emma (daughter of W. Outhwaite) who died in 1853. His eldest daughter Emma Josephine married Robert Campbell on 2 December 1868 in Christchurch, and his daughter Alice married Edward Wingfield Humphreys on 22 April 1869 at St John the Baptist Church in Christchurch.

== See also ==
- Lake Hawdon (South Australia)
