= Heidelberg Historical Society =

- Established: 1967
- Location: Jika St & Park Ln, Heidelberg VIC 3084, Australia
- Coordinates: 37.7571062°S 145.0704325°E
- Type: History museum
- Website: http://www.heidelberghistoricalsociety.com.au

Heidelberg Historical Society is a museum and research organisation devoted to the local and community history of Heidelberg and surrounding areas in the north-eastern suburbs of Melbourne, Victoria, Australia.

The Society is a membership organisation that was founded in 1967. It opened its museum and research centre in the former Heidelberg Courthouse in 1979 and continues to operate these facilities with support from volunteer members. The Society became incorporated as an association in 2002 and is an affiliated society of the Royal Historical Society of Victoria. The Society is located in the City of Banyule, a local government municipality.

== Building ==
The Society's headquarters and museum is the Old Heidelberg Courthouse, formerly part of the Magistrate's Court of Victoria. The red brick building was designed by J B Cohen (an architect in the Public Works Department) and built by Swanson Bros. The foundation stone was laid on 4 October 1899 and work continued throughout the Australian summer, in time for the opening and first court on 2 April 1900.

The Courthouse continued in use until 1979 when a more modern courthouse was built nearby in Jika Street.

The building is owned by the State Government of Victoria and is managed by a committee of the Society.

The Old Heidelberg Courthouse was listed on the National Trust of Australia (Victoria) register in 1982 as it is 'an unusual example of Edwardian period architecture'. The statement of significance draws attention to the 'high octagonal Court Room which has clerestory windows and a steeply pitched hipped roof (formerly slate), is surrounded by ancillary offices with a prominent entrance porch and door with a leadlight over'.

In 2018, the Society joined the Open House Melbourne program, making the building available for public viewing on Saturday 28 July.

== Collection ==
The Society collects and preserves historically significant records and items from the Heidelberg district from its early beginnings in 1838 and the subsequent Shire of Heidelberg (1871-1934), City of Heidelberg (1934-1994) and City of Banyule (from 1994), as established within their boundaries from time to time. The Heidelberg District encompassed a large area to the north-east of the Melbourne stretching from the Merri Creek along the Yarra River and Plenty River through the Diamond Valley to the Kinglake Ranges.

The Society collects objects, photographs, maps, business & community archives, audio-visual media, local newspapers, and electronic databases. It also has a reference library and a number of other information resources to support research.

== Exhibitions ==
The Society develops exhibitions that display items from its own collections, often augmented by loans from members. Recent exhibitions include:

- 'An Invitation to the Ball: Women's formal wear, 1850-1950' (2010).
- 'Against the Forces: A tribute to the memory of Walter Burley Griffin and Marian Mahony Griffin' (2013). This exhibition contributed to nation-wide celebrations of the centenary of the Griffins' design for the city of Canberra.
- 'A Brush with Heidelberg' (2016), highlighting the work of artists in interpreting the local landscape.
- 'Remembering 67' (2017). This exhibition offered a multi-sensory experience of the year 1967, the year of the Society's foundation.
- 'Planting Heidelberg' (2018), showcasing the history of farms, parks and gardens in the Heidelberg district.
- 'Heidelberg's Busy Bee Signature Quilt, 1895-96' (2019-2021). This exhibition opened on 19 May 2019 as part of the Australian Heritage Festival and explores the history of a recent donation to the Society, an historic quilt that is listed with Australia's National Quilt Register. A n interactive website enables people to discover information about many of the individuals who contributed their names to the quilt, and add their own knowledge.
- 'Truth, Beauty & Utility' opened on 10 July 2021. This exhibition explores the Arts & Crafts Movement in the Heidelberg locality, from the sudden craze for Japanese-inspired decoration in the 1880s to the non-historical ‘Art Nouveau’ of 1900, to the rugged Californian bungalow of 1920.

== Activities ==
The Society is an advocate for heritage preservation in its locality and works to acknowledge major civic and community milestones.

It hosts public meetings at which guest speakers present information and ideas that are relevant to the history of the Heidelberg district. Tours to sites of local historic interest are organised from time to time. Volunteers at the museum can assist researchers with enquiries.

The Society publishes The Heidelberg Historian, a regular bimonthly newsletter.

The Society is a not-for-profit organisation that is funded by its members and donors, with additional support for specific projects from a range of institutions.

== Awards and recognition ==
The Society is recognised as a Place of Deposit by the Public Record Office of Victoria (PROV) and is approved to hold original public records that are of local interest and significance.

The exhibition 'An Invitation to the Ball' won 'Best Exhibit/Display' category in the Victorian Community History Awards that were presented in October 2010.

The exhibition 'A Brush with Heidelberg' was commended in the Historical Interpretation category of the Victorian Community History Awards that were presented in October 2016 and the exhibition was listed as "one of the six reasons to visit Heidelberg" in the Age newspaper in August 2016.

The Society's 50th anniversary in 2017 was acknowledged by the Parliament of Victoria.

In 2018 the Society was recognised as a significant part of the Ivanhoe district by member for Ivanhoe Mr Anthony Carbines MP in his speech on the "Planning and Environment Amendment (Distinctive Areas and Landscapes) Bill 2017" for the Parliament of Victoria.

An item from the Society's collection, Heidelberg's Busy Bee Signature Quilt (1895–96), was listed on the National Quilt Register in May 2019.

Also in May 2019, the Weekday Volunteers won the Community Group Award in Banyule City Council's annual volunteer awards.

The exhibition 'Heidelberg's Busy Bee Signature Quilt 1895–96' was commended in the Collaborative Community Award category of the Victorian Community History Awards that were presented in October 2019.
