= Deua National Park =

National park in New South Wales, Australia

- IUCN category Ib (wilderness area)
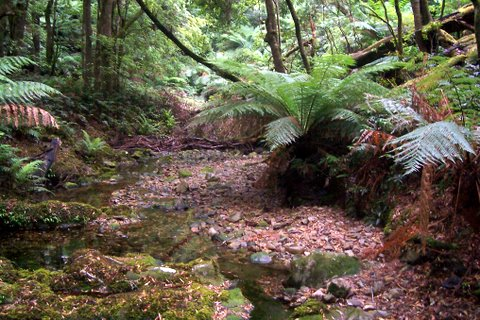
- Rainforest of Deua National Park

- Location within New South Wales
- Location: New South Wales
- Coordinates: 35°58′27″S 149°43′15″E
- Area: 1,220 km^{2} (470 sq mi)
- Established: 1979
- Governing body: National Parks and Wildlife Service (New South Wales)
- Website: Official website

Deua National Park is a national park located in New South Wales, Australia. It lies 320 kilometres (200 mi) south of Sydney and 100 kilometres (62 mi) east of Canberra. The nearest coastal towns are Batemans Bay, Moruya and Narooma.

Deua is a remote wilderness area characterized by escarpments, gullies, waterfalls, limestone caves, pockets of pinkwoodrainforest, and notable eucalyptus scenery. It serves as an important refuge for various plant and animal species, many of which are listed as threatened.

The park has traditional associations with Aboriginal people.

== Flora ==
Common eucalyptus species include black ash, monkey gum, messmate and white ash. Rarer species include the Jilliga ash and Mongamulla mallee. High-altitude rainforests, dominated by pinkwood, hard water fern, and soft tree fern, are found in gullies protected from fire. Other habitats include swamps, bogs, riverside forest, and rocky scrub.

== Fauna ==
Over 106 bird species and 62 mammal species have been recorded within Deua National Park. Noteworthy is the high diversity of birds of prey, including the peregrine falcon and powerful owl. The caves provide maternity sites for a variety of bat species.

== Gallery ==
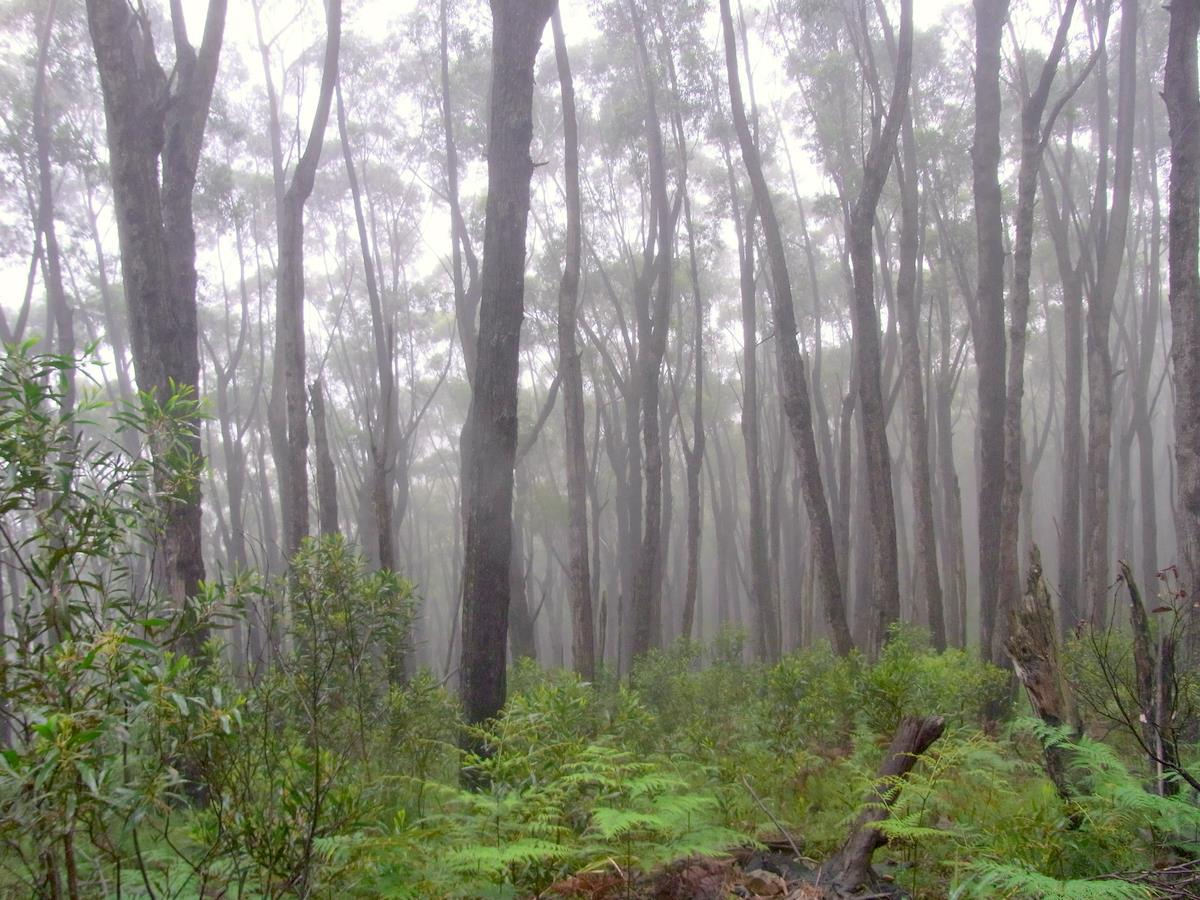
Black ash in mountain mist, Deua National Park

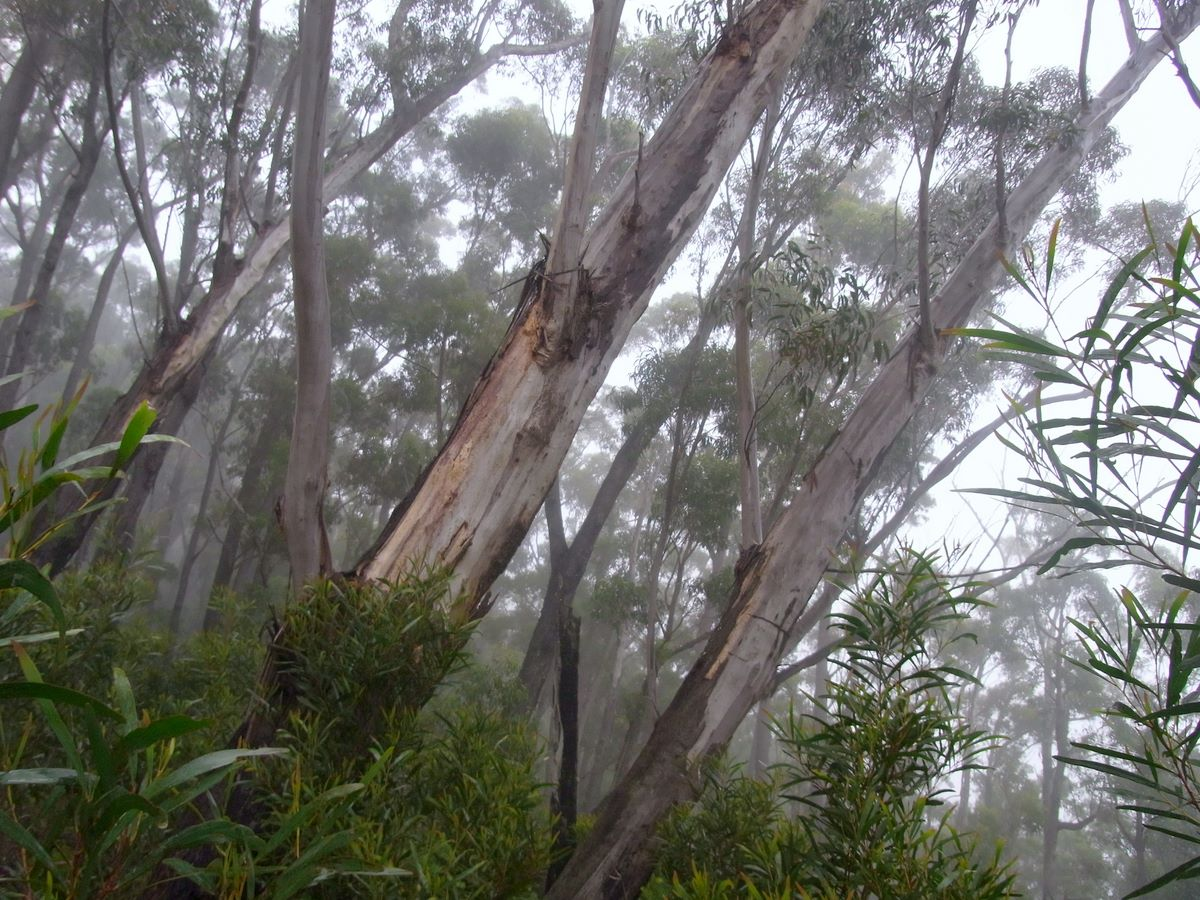
Jilliga ash, Deua National Park

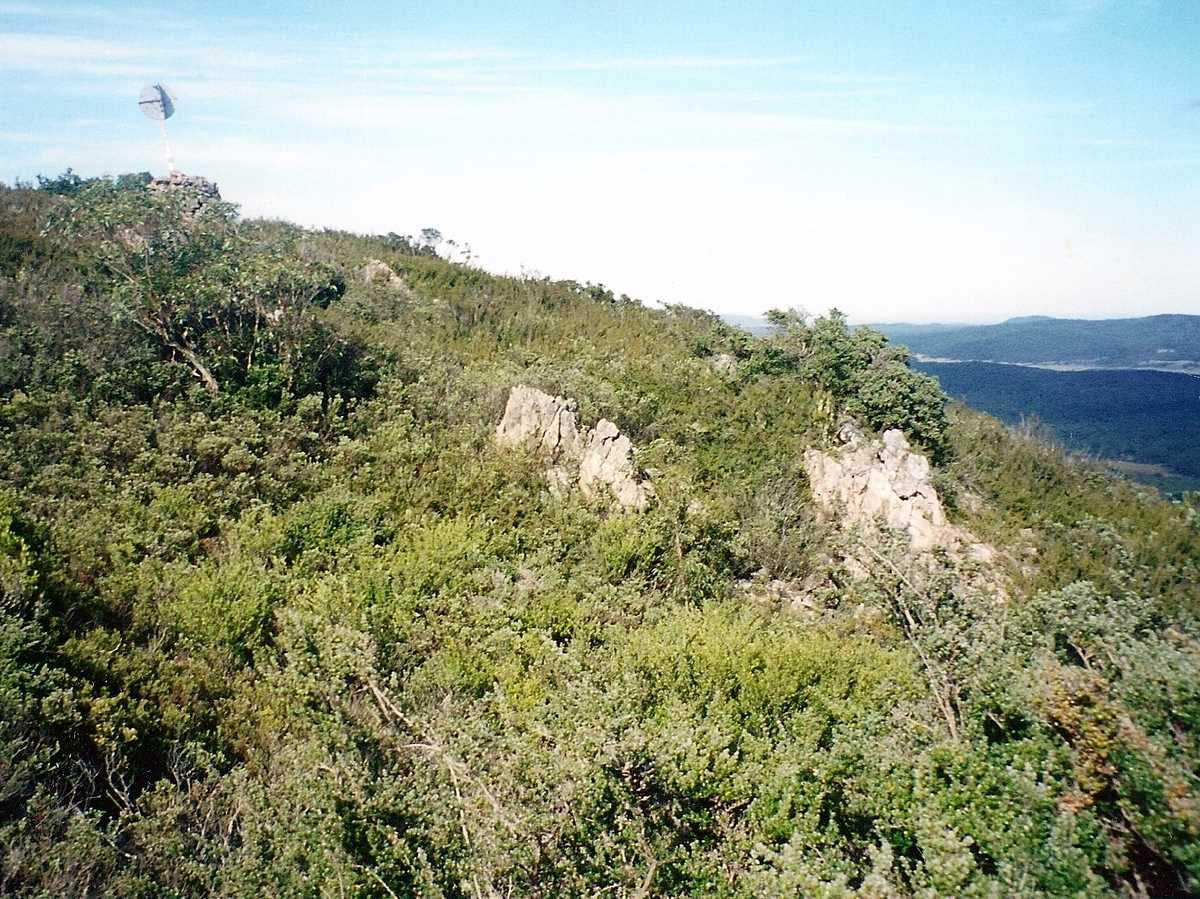
summit of Big Badja Hill, Deua National Park

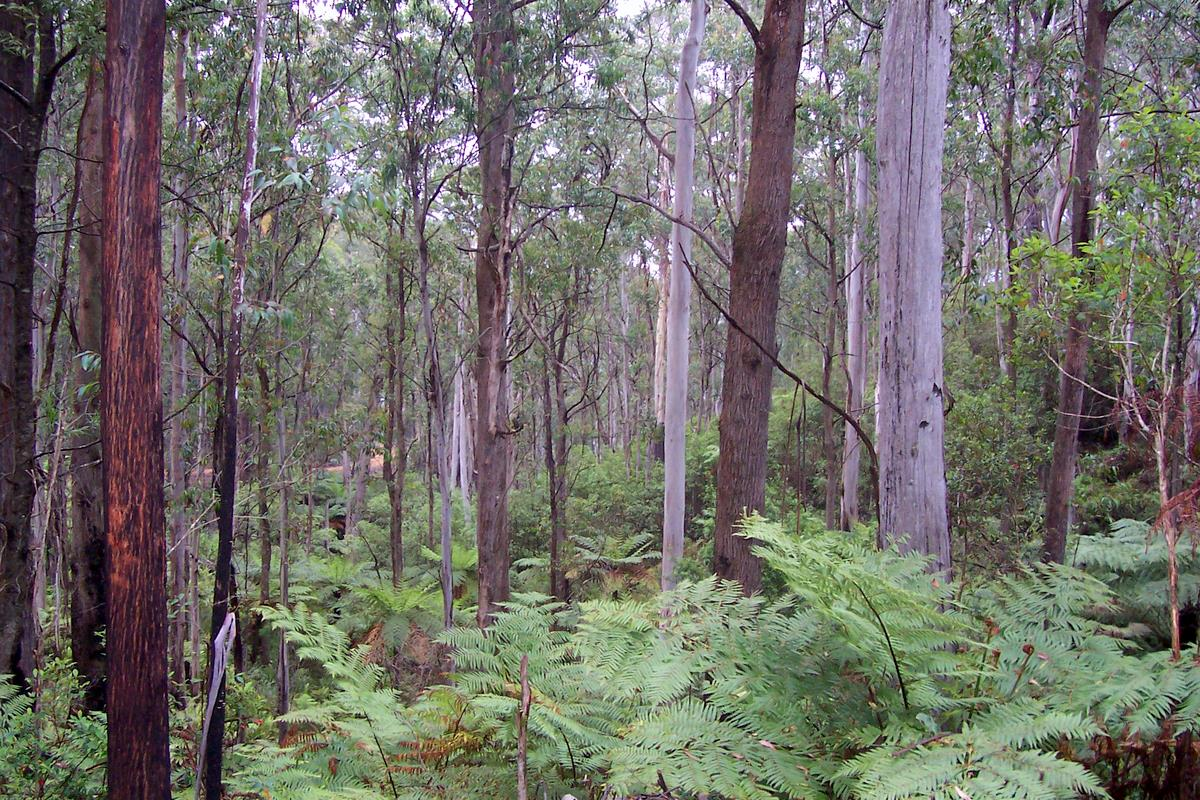
Moist eucalyptus forest, Deua National Park

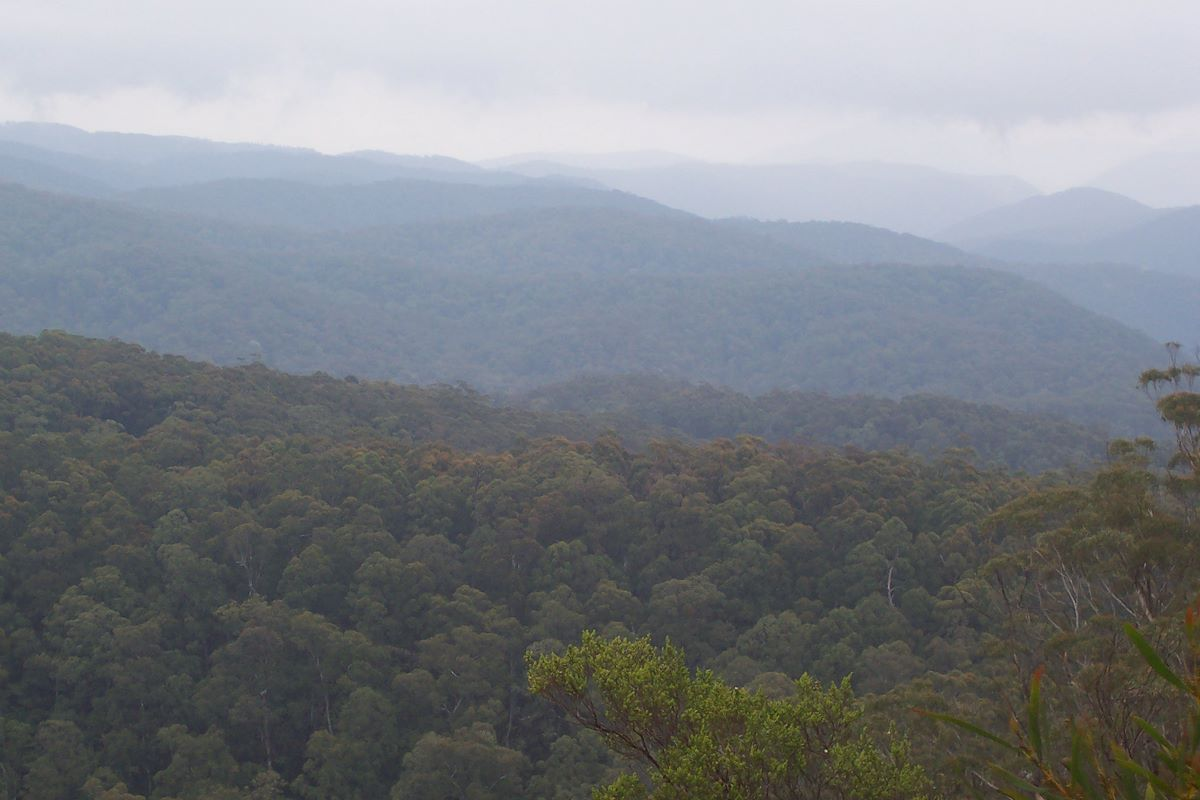
view from Hanging Mountain, Deua National Park

== See also ==
- Protected areas of New South Wales
- Deua National Park travel guide from Wikivoyage
