= Araluen Creek =

River in Australia

Coordinates: 35°40′S 149°49′E

Araluen Creek The Deep Creek
- Location of mouth in New South Wales
- Etymology: Aboriginal: a place where water lilies abound

Location
- Country: Australia
- State: New South Wales
- Region: South East Corner (IBRA), Southern Tablelands, South Coast
- Local government area: Palerang, Eurobodalla

Physical characteristics
- Source: Great Dividing Range
  - location: east of Captains Flat
  - elevation: 741 m (2,431 ft)
- Mouth: confluence with the Deua River
  - location: south of Monga National Park
  - elevation: 104 m (341 ft)
- Length: 24 km (15 mi)

Basin features
- River system: Moruya River catchment
- Tributaries
  - left: Bells Creek, Big Oaky Creek
  - right: Majors Creek
- National park: Monga NP

Araluen Creek, a partly perennial stream of the Moruya River catchment, is located in the Southern Tablelands and South Coast regions of New South Wales, Australia.

== Course and features ==
Araluen Creek rises near Gillian Park, about 4 kilometres (2.5 mi) east of the village of Majors Creek, on the eastern slopes of the Great Dividing Range. The river flows generally south southeast, joined by three minor tributaries before reaching its confluence with the Deua River in remote country south of the Monga National Park. The river descends 637 metres (2,090 ft) over its 24 kilometres (15 mi) course.

The village of Araluen lies in the valley of Araluen Creek, that joins the Deua River at roughly the midpoint in its course. The name 'Araluen' means 'water lily' or 'place of the water lilies' in the local Aboriginal dialect. At the time of European settlement Araluen was described as a broad alluvial valley with many natural billabongs covered with water lilies. However, no such billabongs exist in the Araluen valley today. As with most river and creek valleys in south-eastern Australia, the natural landscape of Araluen Creek and its valley were completely destroyed by rampant and extremely destructive alluvial gold mining in the latter half of the 19th century, exacerbated by extensive gold dredging in the early 20th century. This has mobilised thousands of tons of coarse granitic sands and lead to serious sand-slugging or sand siltation of the lower half of the Deua River below the Araluen Creek confluence. Nevertheless, the Deua River supports valuable populations of the threatened Australian grayling and several other native freshwater fish species.

== See also ==
- Rivers of New South Wales
- List of rivers of New South Wales (A-K)
- List of rivers of Australia
