= Moruya River =

Coordinates: 35°55′S 150°07′E

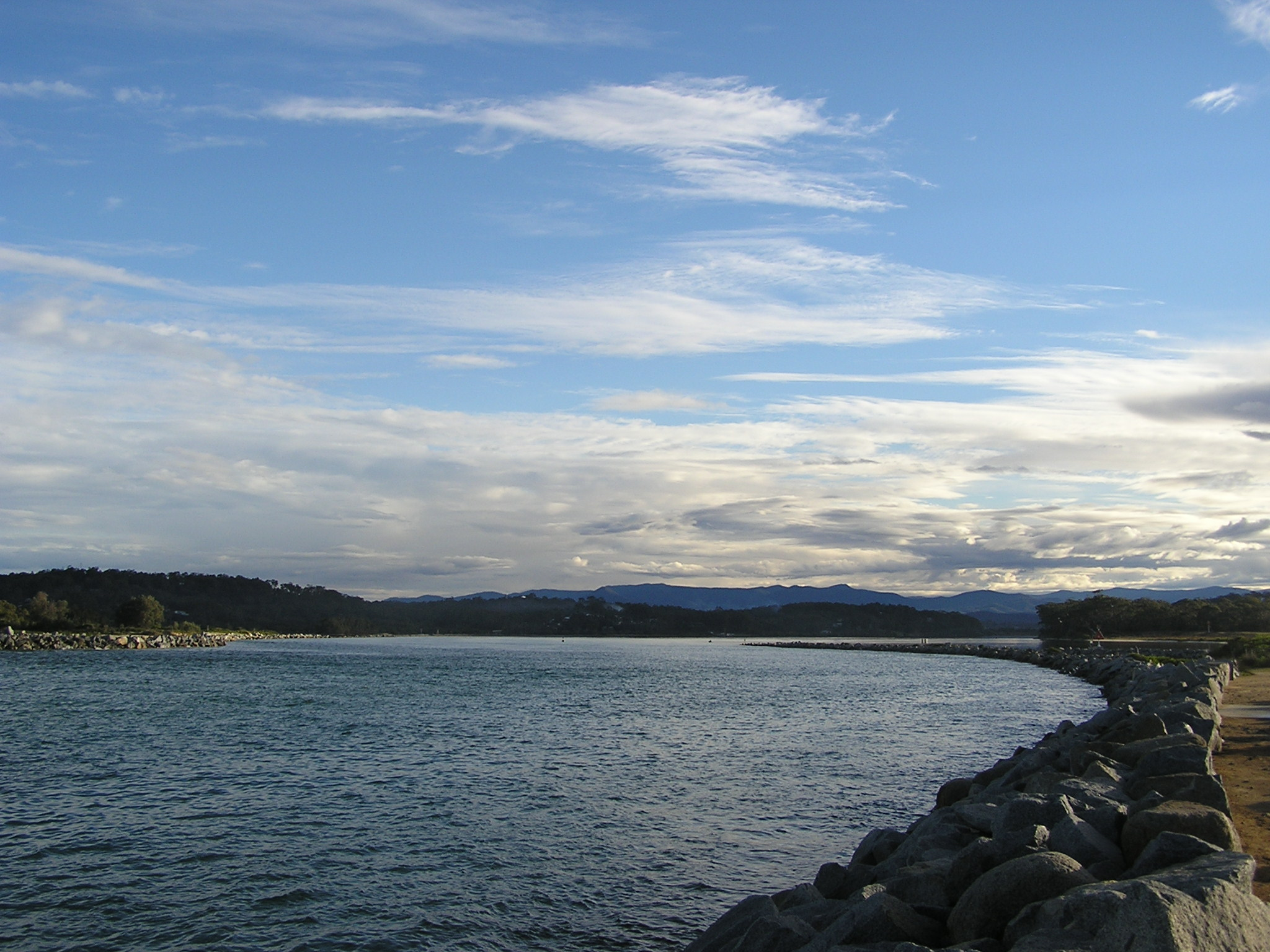
- Moruya River looking upstream from the breakwater on the northern head of the river.

Location
- Country: Australia
- State: New South Wales
- Region: South East Corner (IBRA), South Coast
- Local government area: Eurobodalla
- Town: Moruya

Physical characteristics
- Source confluence: Deua River
  - location: near Kiora
  - elevation: 22 m (72 ft)
- Mouth: Tasman Sea, South Pacific Ocean
- Length: 19 km (12 mi)
- Basin size: 1,424 km^{2} (550 sq mi)

The Moruya River is an open and trained mature wave dominated barrier estuary or tidal river is located in the South Coast region of New South Wales, Australia. In its upper freshwater reaches, the river is known as the Deua River.

== Course and features ==
The headwaters of the Deua River rise south of Braidwood and flow 139 kilometres (86 mi) to the village of Kiora where the Deua River forms its confluence with the Moruya River. The Moruya River flows generally east, joined by two minor tributaries, past the town of Moruya, before reaching its mouth of the Tasman Sea at Moruya Heads. The river descends 22 metres (72 ft) over its 19 kilometres (12 mi) course.

=== Barrier entrance ===
The river has a bar at its confluence with the Tasman Sea. Work on the river training walls was concentrated in 1907, following extensive siltation of the river opening. The dredge Antleon was based there during the 1920s, when in 1924, the steamer Benandra was wrecked at the entrance. Work on the break walls was completed in 1925 when huge storms required some repairs to the training walls. The port gained greater significance in 1924 when a stone quarry was opened and used to supply granite for the pylons of the Sydney Harbour Bridge, and the stone for the Cenotaph in Martin Place. The Public Works Department built a wharf adjacent to the quarry fore ease of use. Extensions to the southern training walls were undertaken between 1931 and 1933, with major additional works from 1946 to 1954. The bar is dangerous to shipping and as a result of its hazards for smaller ships and because it prevented access by larger ones, the major settlement in the area was first developed at nearby Broulee. In 1841 a flood cleared the bar and the town of Moruya, now accessible to shipping, developed at the expense of the settlement at Broulee despite later recurring problems with the bar, not least as it was the easiest point to access the rich Araluen goldfields from the 1850s.

The bar is now managed in part by a rock breakwall on the northern side of the river.

== History ==
The river was previously navigable by coastal shipping to Moruya and was serviced by the Illawarra Steam Navigation Company. The Benandra, a wooden screw steamer operated by the Illawarra Steam Navigation Company to transport cargo, was lost on 25 March 1924 when it hit the sandspit near the bar. At least one person died.

The Princes Highway crosses the Moruya River at Moruya. The first bridge across the Moruya River was erected in 1876. Due to frequent flooding new bridges were erected in 1900 and 1945 and, most recently, in 1966.

== Nature ==
=== Wildlife ===
Coast-favoring southern right whales may enter into the river mouth. Mordacia praecox is a species of southern topeyed lamprey that is found only in the Moroya and Tuross Rivers.

== See also ==
- Rivers of New South Wales
- List of rivers of New South Wales (L–Z)
- List of rivers of Australia
