= Moruya =

- Town
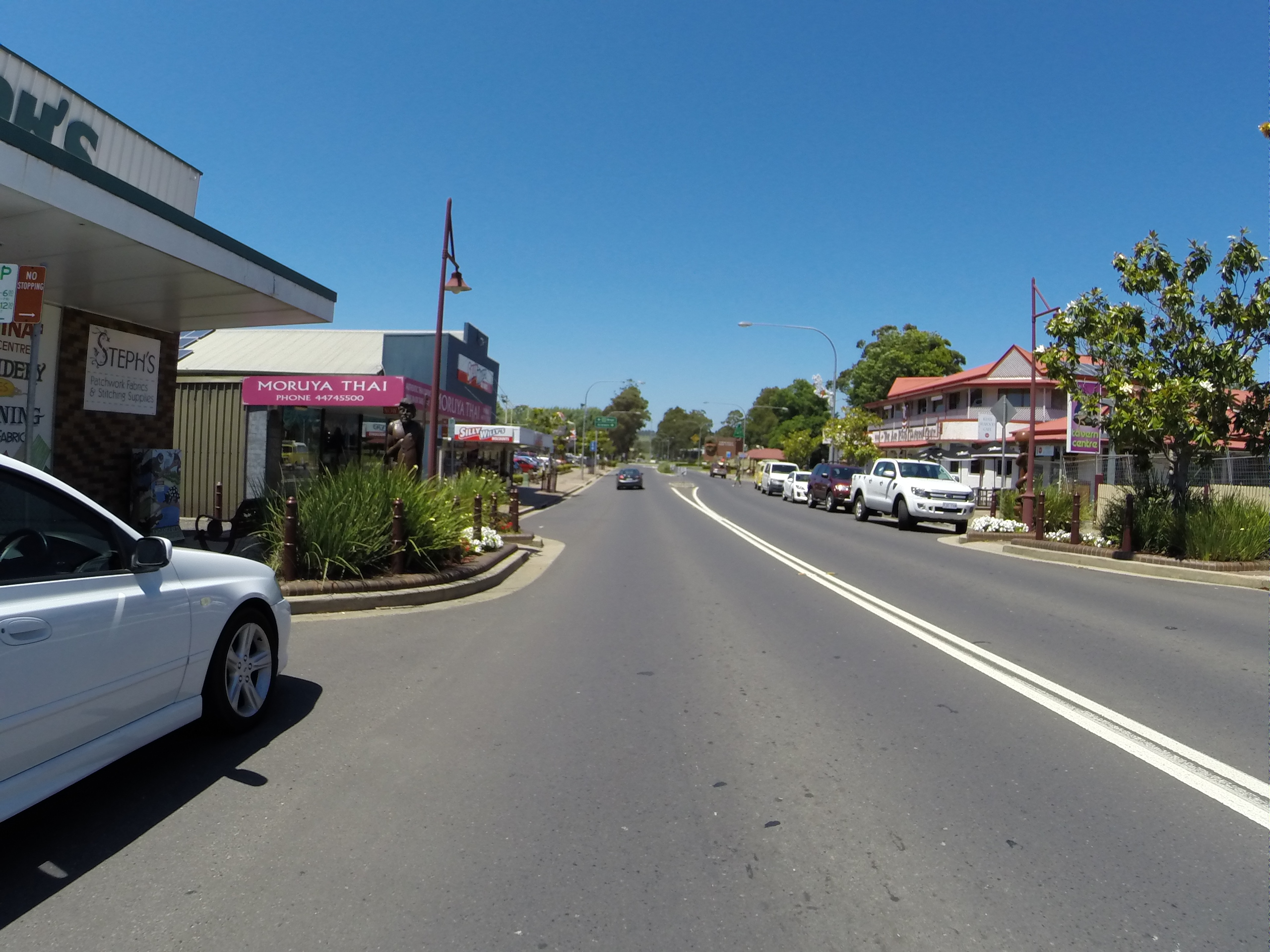
- Moruya main street

- Coordinates: 35°54′40″S 150°04′50″E
- Country: Australia
- State: New South Wales
- LGA: Eurobodalla Shire
- Location: 175 km (109 mi) from Canberra; 305 km (190 mi) from Sydney; 120 km (75 mi) from Bega; 25 km (16 mi) from Batemans Bay; 51 km (32 mi) from Narooma
- Established: 1851

Government
  - State electorate: Bega
  - Federal division: Gilmore
- Elevation: 3 m (9.8 ft)

Population
  - Total: 2,762 (UCL 2021)
- Postcode: 2537
- County: Dampier
- Parish: Moruya
Localities around Moruya
Mogendoura	Bimbimbie	Broulee
Kiora	Moruya	Tasman Sea
Wamban	Bergalia	Moruya Heads

Moruya (/mɔːruːjə/ MOR-oo-yə) is a town located on the far south coast of New South Wales, Australia, situated on the Moruya River. The Princes Highway runs through the town that is about 305 km (190 mi) south of Sydney and 175 km (109 mi) from Canberra. At the 2021 census, Moruya had a population of 4,295. Its built-up area had a population of 2,762. The town relies predominantly on agriculture, aquaculture, and tourism. Moruya is administered by the Eurobodalla Shire Council and the shire chambers are located in the town.

== History ==
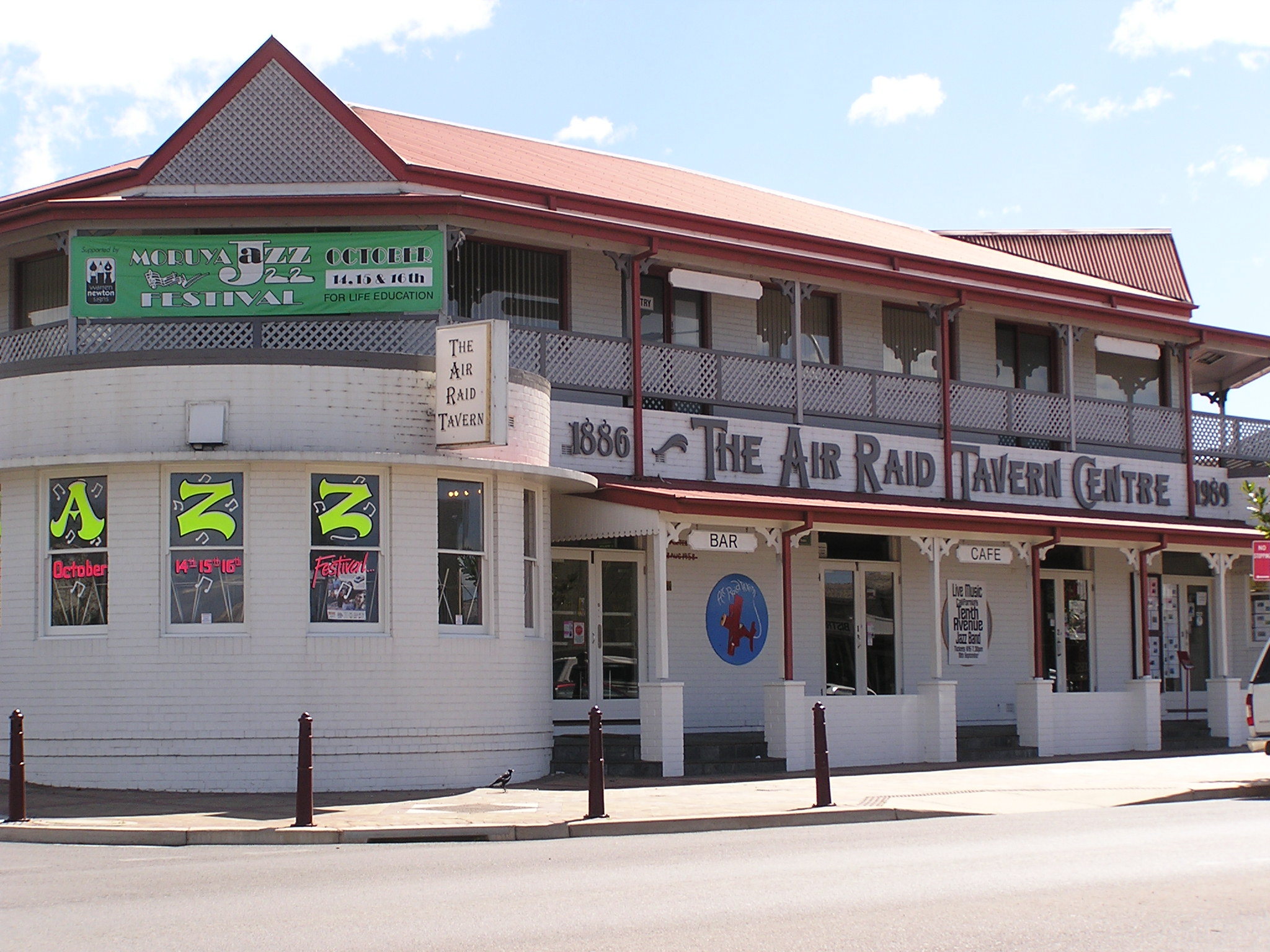
Air Raid Tavern, Moruya

The South Coast region of New South Wales is the traditional home of the Yuin people, with the area in and around Moruya home to the Bugelli-Manji clan.

The name "Moruya" is derived from an Aboriginal Tharawal word (Tharawal pronunciation [mherroyah]) believed to mean "home of the black swan", although this is not probable and not verifiable. Black swans can be seen in the lakes and rivers around Moruya, and the black swan is used locally as an emblem.

European settlement commenced in the 1820s following the extension of the limits of location in 1829, although the coast from Batemans Bay to Moruya was surveyed the previous year by surveyor Thomas Florance. The first European settler was Francis Flanagan, a tailor from Ireland, who was granted title to 4 sq mi (1,000 ha) on the north bank of the river at Shannon View in 1829. In 1830, the next settler, John Hawdon, set up a squat at Bergalia, but being beyond the limits, could not gain title to the land. In 1831, though, he was granted land on the north bank of the river, upstream from Flanagan. He called the property Kiora, and it also occupied 4 sq mi (1,000 ha). A village named after the property soon grew.

In 1835, across the river from Flanagan, William Morris squatted a block he called Gundary. William Campbell took up as a manager there and eventually bought the place himself in 1845. The town centre was surveyed in 1850 by surveyor Parkinson and the town was gazetted in 1851. It centred about the track opposite where the road from Broulee terminated at the river bank, the two being linked by a punt. As a blacksmith was on that track, it was named Vulcan Street. Campbell Street owed its name to the squatter, Queen Street to patriotism, and Church Street to the Catholic Church's presence there; a Catholic church was later completed in 1887. Land sales commenced in 1852.

Moruya was proclaimed a municipality in 1891. Local industries were timber logging, gold mining, dairying, and quarrying for granite. The first bridge across the Moruya River was erected in 1876, though frequent flooding caused new bridges to be erected in 1900, 1945, and most recently in 1966.

During World War II, Moruya aerodrome was used as an advanced operational base by the RAAF. The fishing trawler Dureenbee was attacked offshore between Moruya and Batemans Bay by a Japanese submarine on 3 August 1942, leading to the deaths of three merchant seamen who are buried in Moruya cemetery. A "bush memorial" has been dedicated to these sailors and 8 other airmen who were killed whilst operating out of Moruya Aerodrome during the war. The memorial is located at the site of the wartime airstrip.

On 25 December 1944, the US liberty ship USS Robert J. Walker was torpedoed off Moruya by the German submarine U-862, sinking the next day between Moruya and Bega. Casualties were two dead, with 67 survivors.

Rural areas around Moruya were affected by the 2019–20 Australian bushfire season.

== Heritage listings ==
Moruya has a number of heritage-listed sites, including:

- Moruya and District Historical Society, 85 Campbell Street: Abernethy and Co Stonemason's Lathe
- 13 Page Street: Moruya Mechanics' Institute

== Moruya granite ==
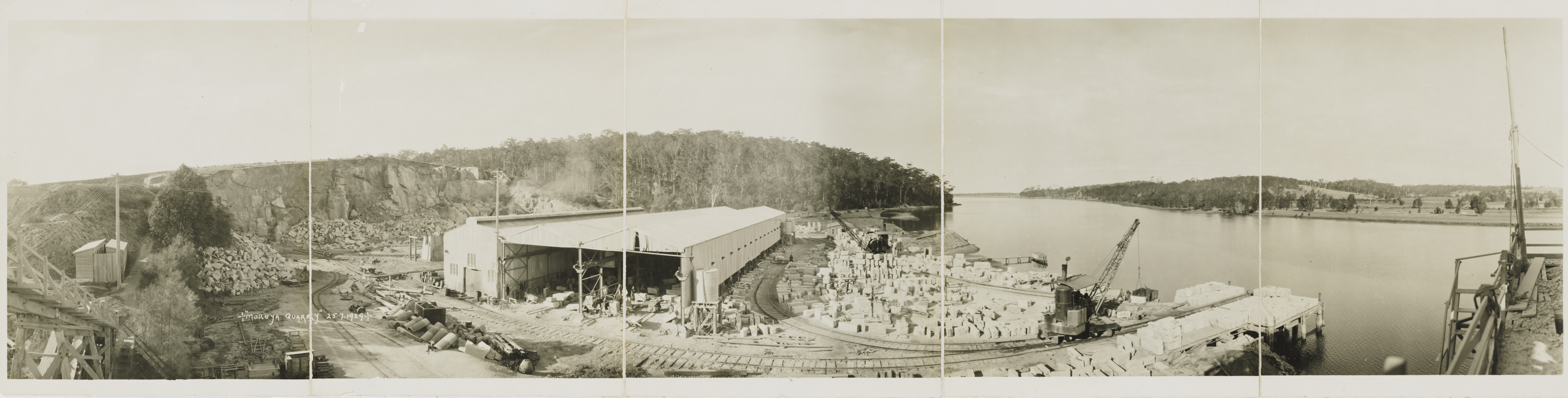
Moruya Quarry, New South Wales, 1929

Moruya is known for its granite stone that was used to build significant Australian landmarks, including the Sydney Harbour Bridge. The granite used in the Harbour Bridge pylons was quarried in the area. The proximity of the quarries to the water meant it could be easily transported to Sydney. Quarrying for granite commenced in the district in the late 1850s by brothers Joseph and John Flett Louttit, who were from the Orkney Islands. Their quarry on the south side of the river produced stone for many Sydney landmarks, including the columns of the General Post Office in Martin Place, and the base of the Captain Cook statue in Hyde Park.

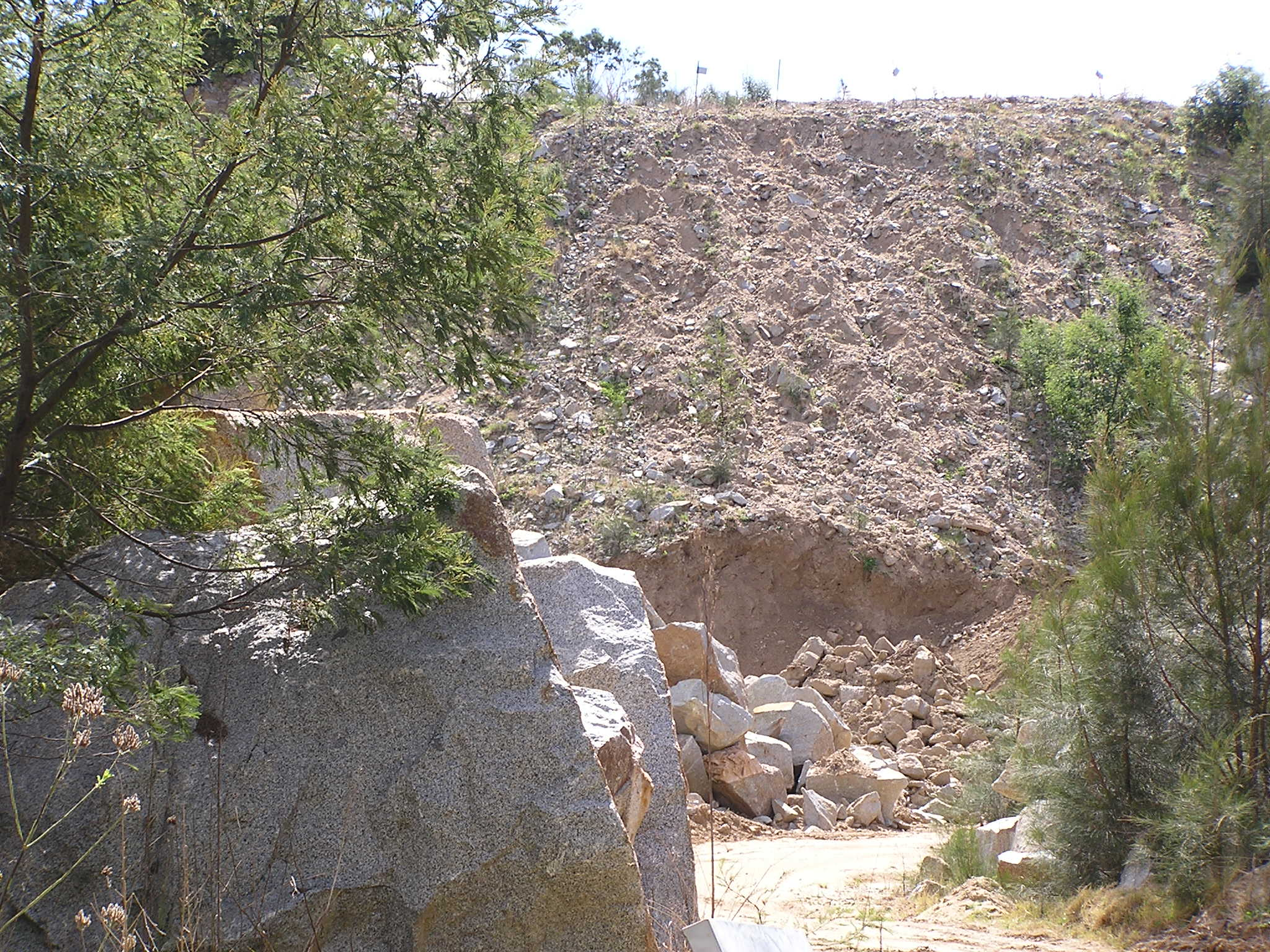
Moruya Quarry

The Moruya Quarry, also known as the Government Quarry, opened in 1876 on the northern bank of the Moruya River. From 1925 to 1932, the Harbour Bridge works had 250 stonemasons employed and relocated to Moruya by the contractor to produce 20,000 cu yd (15,000 m^{3}) of dimension stone for the bridge pylons, 173,000 blocks, and 200,000 yards of crushed stone that was used as aggregate for concrete. Moruya granite was also used for the Sydney Cenotaph in Martin Place. During the seven years of this work, a small town of about 70 houses grew up near the quarry called Granitetown; little remains of the town today. The quarry had a tramway that closed in 1931. The wharf that was used by the quarry stood until around 2008, but was pulled down and replaced by a fishing platform.

Stone was also quarried for the construction of the breakwaters at the mouth of the Moruya River, between 1946 and 1954. There was a temporary railway used to carry the stone to the breakwater construction site.

The Moruya Quarry is operated by the New South Wales Department of Infrastructure, Planning, and Natural Resources. A third quarry west of the Moruya Quarry was operated by the Ziegler family.

== Retail ==
Moruya has various retailers, banks, and services located on the high street, whilst supermarkets are located on the side streets. Harris Scarfe has a store in the town, it being a former branch of Goulburn retailer Allen's. Moruya has two supermarkets; one is a 10-aisle Woolworths (opened in 2000) and an IGA (opened in 2013). The former eight-aisle Franklins, which opened on 28 June 2011, ceased trading in February 2013.

Moruya is also home to the regional telecommunications company, Southern Phone. The Tuesday afternoon and Saturday markets and fruit and vegetable markets are popular with local people and visitors.

== Landmarks ==
Moruya Airport (code MYA) is located on the north side of Moruya Heads. The strip adjoins the beachfront, and flights to Moruya offer a slow and picturesque descent along the coastline. Rex Airlines flies mostly Saab 340B aircraft from Moruya to Sydney and Moruya to Merimbula, with connecting flights to Melbourne.

== Climate ==
Moruya has a mild oceanic climate (Cfb) with warm, wet summers and cool, moderately drier winters. The drier winters are owed to the foehn effect from the Great Dividing Range, which blocks rainfall from the westerly cold fronts that arrive from the Southern Ocean. The town features 121.2 clear days annually.

Climate data for Moruya Heads Pilot Station (1991–2020 averages, 1910–2024 extremes)
Month	Jan	Feb	Mar	Apr	May	Jun	Jul	Aug	Sep	Oct	Nov	Dec	Year
Record high °C (°F)	43.9 (111.0)	43.3 (109.9)	40.6 (105.1)	35.1 (95.2)	28.6 (83.5)	24.4 (75.9)	25.6 (78.1)	30.0 (86.0)	35.4 (95.7)	37.2 (99.0)	41.6 (106.9)	42.2 (108.0)	43.9 (111.0)
Mean daily maximum °C (°F)	24.0 (75.2)	24.0 (75.2)	23.2 (73.8)	21.5 (70.7)	19.4 (66.9)	17.1 (62.8)	16.7 (62.1)	17.6 (63.7)	19.3 (66.7)	20.5 (68.9)	21.3 (70.3)	22.6 (72.7)	20.6 (69.1)
Mean daily minimum °C (°F)	17.1 (62.8)	17.1 (62.8)	15.6 (60.1)	12.8 (55.0)	10.0 (50.0)	8.0 (46.4)	6.6 (43.9)	7.2 (45.0)	9.3 (48.7)	11.4 (52.5)	13.5 (56.3)	15.4 (59.7)	12.0 (53.6)
Record low °C (°F)	7.8 (46.0)	7.4 (45.3)	5.9 (42.6)	3.2 (37.8)	2.2 (36.0)	0.4 (32.7)	−0.3 (31.5)	0.1 (32.2)	0.6 (33.1)	3.2 (37.8)	4.7 (40.5)	5.6 (42.1)	−0.3 (31.5)
Average rainfall mm (inches)	86.8 (3.42)	102.8 (4.05)	88.5 (3.48)	66.4 (2.61)	54.9 (2.16)	95.4 (3.76)	56.8 (2.24)	57.0 (2.24)	50.9 (2.00)	77.6 (3.06)	82.6 (3.25)	87.5 (3.44)	907.2 (35.72)
Average rainy days (≥ 0.2 mm)	12.1	11.3	10.9	8.3	6.9	7.8	6.4	5.8	8.8	10.5	11.3	11.7	111.8
Average relative humidity (%)	72	73	69	65	63	60	58	56	61	65	69	71	65
Average dew point °C (°F)	16.8 (62.2)	17.4 (63.3)	16.0 (60.8)	13.0 (55.4)	10.5 (50.9)	8.0 (46.4)	6.7 (44.1)	6.8 (44.2)	9.0 (48.2)	11.0 (51.8)	13.1 (55.6)	15.1 (59.2)	12.0 (53.6)
Source 1: Bureau of Meteorology, Moruya Heads Pilot Station (1991–2020)
Source 2: Bureau of Meteorology, Moruya Heads Pilot Station (all years)

== Notable residents ==
- Sarah Andrews – former cricket player; represented Australia
- Josh Cunningham – musician with The Waifs
- Charles Harpur – poet; a former goldfields commissioner in the Eurobodalla area; a farmer at Eurobodalla
- Jarrad Kennedy – former rugby league football player
- Norm Ryan – politician; represented Labor
- Michael Weyman – former rugby league football player; played with the Kangaroos
- Richie Williams – former rugby league player
- Teig Wilton – rugby league player
- Bill Woods – television sports presenter
- Stevie Wright – lead vocalist with The Easybeats
- Jane Duren – Aboriginal Activist in 1920s South Coast
- Margaret Reddan – former marathon runner

== See also ==
- Moruya High School
