= Deua River =

Coordinates: 35°45′S 149°47′E

Deua River Moruya River
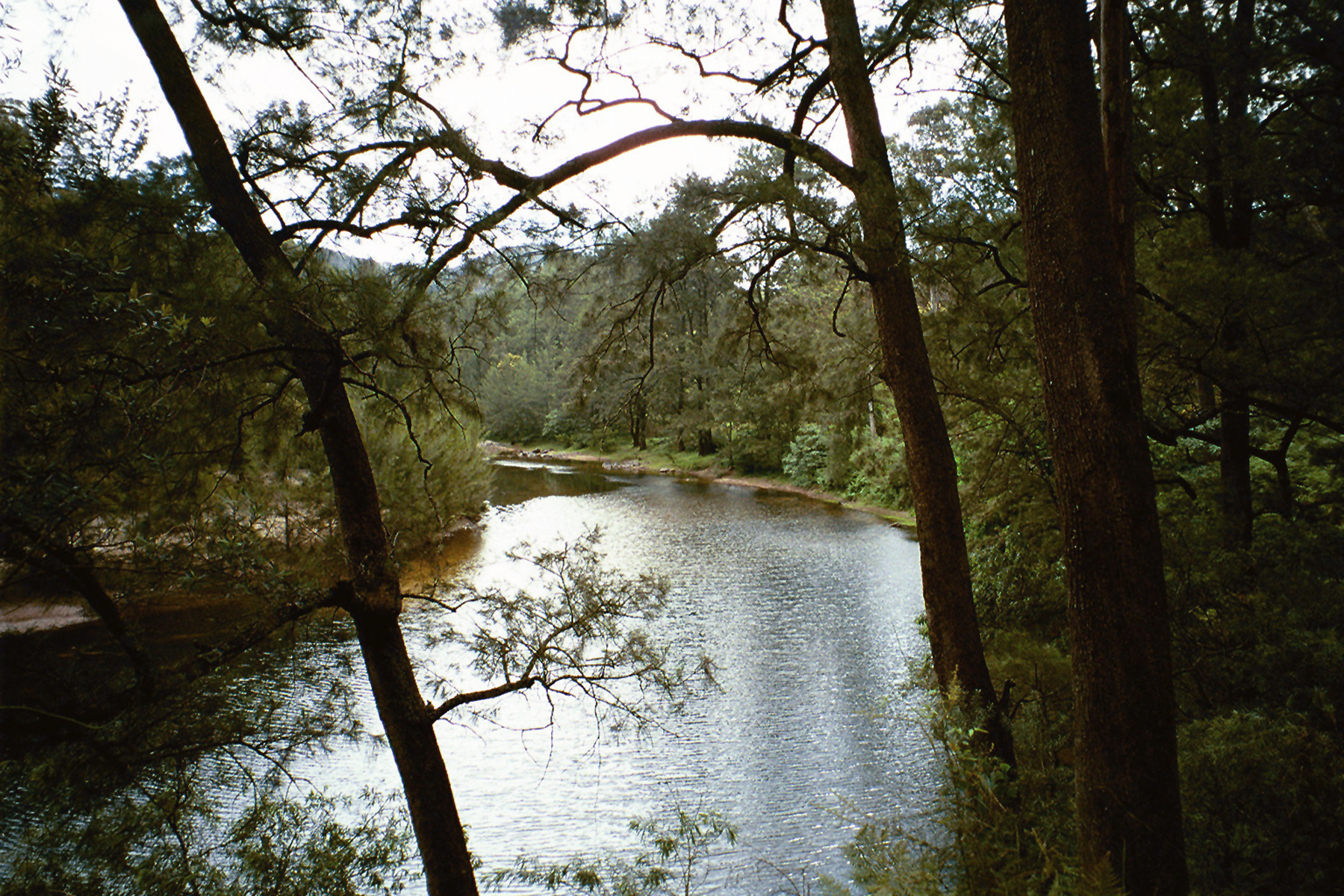
- A large pool on the Deua River, the freshwater reaches of the Moruya River, during a period of higher flows.

Location
- Country: Australia
- State: New South Wales
- Region: South East Corner (IBRA), South Coast
- Local government area: Eurobodalla

Physical characteristics
- Source: Badja Range, Great Dividing Range within Deua National Park
  - location: southeast of Bendethera Mountain
  - elevation: 641 m (2,103 ft)
- Mouth: confluence with the Moruya River
  - location: near Kiora
  - elevation: 7 m (23 ft)
- Length: 139 km (86 mi)

Basin features
- River system: Moruya River catchment
- National park: Deua NP

The Deua River, being the main perennial river of the Moruya River catchment, is located in the South Coast region of New South Wales, Australia.

== Course and features ==
The Deua River rises about 5 kilometres (3.1 mi) southeast of Bendethera Mountain, on the eastern slopes of the Badja Range, part of the Great Dividing Range, within Deua National Park, in rugged and thickly forested ranges south of Braidwood. The river flows generally south, west, north, northeast, south southeast and east, making almost a complete circle, and is joined by fourteen minor tributaries, before becoming the Moruya River near Kiora. The river descends 634 metres (2,080 ft) over its 139 kilometres (86 mi) course.

The lower reaches of the river are estuarine by nature and are called the Moruya River, while the freshwater reaches are called the Deua River. The upper catchment of the Deua River is suspected to be in a rain shadow, so the Deua River is on the whole a small river, and naturally experiences periods of very low flow. Heavy use of groundwater and riverwater however, for summer irrigation of fruit crop in the tributary Araluen Valley and the main river locality Merricumbene, greatly exacerbate summer low flows.

The village of Araluen lies in the valley of Araluen Creek, that joins the Deua River at roughly the midpoint in its course. The name 'Araluen' means 'water lily' or 'place of the water lilies' in the local aboriginal dialect. At the time of European settlement Araluen was described as a broad alluvial valley with one or more large natural billabongs covered with water lilies, likely providing some unusual but important habitat for native fish and other aquatic fauna. Unfortunately, no such billabongs exist in the Araluen valley today. As with most river and creek valleys in south-eastern Australia, the natural landscape and landforms of Araluen Creek and its valley were destroyed by rampant and destructive gold mining, including via hydraulic sluicing, in the latter half of the 1800s. This has mobilised hundreds of thousands of tons of coarse granitic sand and has led to serious sand-slugging or sand siltation of the lower half of the Deua River below the Araluen Creek confluence. New gold mines in the headwaters of the river remain controversial and have attracted considerable public attention for their proposed use of cyanide and breaches of environmental standards.

Despite the sand-slugging the Deua River is bio-diverse and supports an extremely important population of the endangered fish the Australian grayling (Prototroctes maraena)—possibly the best in the state of New South Wales—as well as thriving populations of several other native freshwater fish species including Cox's gudgeon (Gobiomorphus coxii), congolli (Pseudaphritis urvillii), Australian smelt (Retropinna semoni) and Galaxiids (Galaxias sp.), as well as some Australian bass (Macquaria novemaculeata). The river also supports healthy populations of platypus, azure kingfishers and eastern water dragons.

== Historical accounts of sand-slugging ==
It is evident from the following accounts that sand-slugging of the Deua/Moruya Rivers commenced rapidly after the rampant destruction (via sluicing) of the tributary Araluen Creek and its valley in the 1860s. The damage of this gold-mining will last many lifetimes, as it is evident that the copious sand-slugging now present in the river will take many thousands of years to work through the river and out to sea via floods.

Yarragee in its spring dress is really a pretty little village. It is situated about two miles from the town- ship, and on a bend of the Moruya River. The cottages are very comfortable, surrounded by flowers, timber, and fruit trees, and those in particular of Messrs. Jacob Luck, John Luck, and T. Gannon, are worthy of note. Near the banks of the river, Mr. Jacob Luck has a nice plantation of some hundreds of various young orange trees. Here my attention was called to the state of the Moruya River, which is very shallow at this point, being filled, it is alleged, by the silt washed down from the Araluen diggings by the floods. About sixteen years ago the depth was sufficiently great to allow a vessel of sixty tons register to be built and launched here. This vessel belonged to Mr. Collett, whose estate I have described. Now the stream is scarcely a foot deep at this point, which is about six miles from Moruya, following the river course.

A Tour to the South. [FROM OUR SPECIAL CORRESPONDENT.] No. 10.—THE BROULEE DISTRICT (CONTINUED). Australian Town and Country Journal, Saturday 21 October 1871, Page 11

Moruya stands on the south bank of the Moruya River, which runs west and east, its head being only five miles from the township. Steamers and coasters can enter the river with safety, and as several improvements have been effected of late years, the vessels find a fair port of shelter. The Moruya at the township is a fine wide stream fully 300 yards across; unfortunately it is shallow and only navigable for boats. The increase of silt in the river of late years has been somewhat remarkable, and can only be accounted for from the fact that the Moruya being the outlet for Araluen and the diggings around its head, it is stated that thousands of tons of sand are washed down each flood. The silting up of the stream would be of little moment were it not that directly opposite the town a sand-bank has during the last year placed itself, rendering the passage of the punt impossible. Traffic being impeded the inhabitants of Moruya are seriously inconvenienced. Petitions for a bridge have been presented, and the residents of the town and district are most anxious for a favourable consideration of their request.

The Southern Coast Districts.—From Bega to Moruya. [FROM OUR CORRESPONDENT.] The Sydney Mail and New South Wales Advertiser, Saturday 26 July 1873, Page 102

Some ten months back, I described in the columns of the Herald the southern coast, Moruya being included in my jottings with the rest of the coast town. I will not therefore at present enter into detail, but simply string together a few memories, mental ones made during my progress from Moruya to Manaro.

One of the first of these memories, I find, must touch upon the Moruya River, a stream which, by the way, of late years has not been conducting itself in a manner likely to benefit or keep the goodwill of the residents along its banks. Some short time back a punt used to travel from bank to bank opposite the town, the depth of water being quite sufficient for the purpose—indeed more, for I believe small coasting craft used to come up from the Heads to the town, a distance of about five miles. Latterly, however, the stream commenced to silt up, each fresh bringing down from the Araluen thousands of tons of sand. In fact, the Moruya for years had to do the duty of a monster tail-race for the diggers of the Araluen Valley. Immense sandbanks now have formed in the river. The punt cannot work, and the crossings, which only can be attempted by horses or vehicles at low tides, are dangerous in the extreme. This state of things is most disagreeable to the people of Moruya, and offers a serious bar to the traffic along this part of the coast.

By all reports, and according to all opinions, nothing but a bridge can answer the purpose. To obtain this boon the residents of the district have struggled, and I believe intend this year to make another attempt.

TRIP TO THE MANARO. [BY OUR SPECIAL REPORTER.] The Sydney Morning Herald, Thursday 26 March 1874, Page 6

On approaching Araluen affairs assume a more serious air. The change commences where the Sideling Gold Mining Company has erected its great waterwheel, and is at work reefing and ground sluicing. This is at a distance of seven miles from Araluen. The company consists of eight proprietors, who are sanguine. The particulars promised respecting this claim have not yet reached me. From this claim the indications of mining increase. The timber is more interfered with, races intersected the country everywhere, and patches of upturned country impart an air of desolation inseparable from mining industry. The Araluen Creek winds through an extensive valley 1200 feet above the sea level, and surrounded by ranges of mountains about two miles apart. The ranges attain an altitude of 1000 feet, are precipitous, and sparsely wooded to the summit. In this enclosure the shallow stream which now winds about, once swelled into a lagoon [i.e. the lagoon once covered in water lilies], and over the whole of the rocky bed formed a deposit which is now the object of search. This layer of "wash-dirt", which varies from four to thirty feet in depth, contains the gold. Near the creek it is easily reached, but away back it is covered with the tailings and debris of former diggers, that has to be removed. Further from the creek, therefore, the more stripping there is to deal with—16, 18, and 20 feet.

FROM MORUYA TO ARALUEN. [FROM AN OCCASIONAL TRAVELLER.] ARALUEN, NOVEMBER 20. The Sydney Mail and New South Wales Advertiser, Saturday 28 November 1874, Page 683

Sir,—For the information of those who are opposed to dredging on the Murrumbidgee, permit me to quote the reply given recently at the Chamber of Mines, Sydney, by a New Zealand expert. The question was—What effect had dredging on natural watercourses. His reply—Nothing more than that produced by ordinary sluicing. If that be so the people of the lower Murrumbidgee have every reason to be alarmed should the Minister grant the lease applied for at Gundagai. We have ample proof of the damage sluicing at Araluen has done on the Moruya River; it was, prior to the gold discovery at Araluen, navigable to the township of Moruya, but now the coasters cannot approach within ten miles of the town; the river has silted up to such a degree that rich maize-growing flats, which were formerly impervious to floods, now become submerged when we have what may be termed a moderate rainfall, making the land practically valueless for maize production. There are many gentlemen, residents of Gundagai, who can bear witness to the accuracy of the above statement. The public importance of this matter is my claim on your val able apace.— I am, etc., JAMES J. DUFFY. Jones' Creek, August 8, 1900.

PUBLIC OPINION. A MUCH-DISCUSSED QUESTION. TO THE EDITOR. The Gundagai Times and Tumut, Adelong and Murrumbidgee District Advertiser, Friday 10 August 1900, Page 2

== See also ==
- Rivers of New South Wales
- List of rivers of New South Wales (A–K)
- List of rivers of Australia
