= Group 16 Rugby League =

Rugby league competition in New South Wales

- Sport: Rugby league
- Formerly known as: Far South Coast Rugby League
- Instituted: 1932
- Inaugural season: 1946
- Number of teams: 9
- Country: Australia
- Premiers: Tathra Sea Eagles (2026)
- Most titles: Eden Tigers (14 titles)
- Website: Group 16 Rugby League Website

Group 16 is a rugby league competition on the south coast of New South Wales, run under the auspices of the Country Rugby League. The Group 16 district covers the area from Batemans Bay down the Sapphire Coast to Eden, and inland across the Southern Tablelands to the Snowy Mountains towns of Cooma and Jindabyne.

Due to the COVID-19 pandemic in Australia the commencement of Group 16 2020 season was postponed and subsequently cancelled.

The competition is held across four grades, First Grade, Reserve Grade, Ladies League Tag and Under 18s.

The competition also has a junior league with clubs aligned with their respective teams of the senior competition.

== Teams ==
Club	Est.	Home Ground	Premierships		Premiership Years
Club	Est.	Home Ground	Sub Group	Group	Premiership Years
Batemans Bay Tigers	1897	Mackay Park	3	1	1940 (Bodalla); 1948, 1953 (Northern); 1967
Bega Roosters	1960	Bega Recreation Ground	0	12	1966, 1971, 1972, 1985, 1986, 1987, 1988, 1990, 2000, 2001, 2014, 2022
Bombala Blue Heelers	1932	Bombala Showground & Delegate Showground	9	6	1932, 1933, 1934, 1935, 1936 (Southern Monaro); 1950, 1966, 1967, 1968 (Group 19); 1976, 1977, 1979, 1983, 1991, 2018
Cooma Stallions	1971	Cooma Showground	0	3	1984, 1994, 2017
Eden Tigers	1940	George Brown Memorial Oval	3	14	1947, 1949, 1954 (Imlay); 1959, 1963, 1978, 1981, 1982, 1992, 1995, 1997, 2002, 2006, 2007, 2008, 2010, 2011
Merimbula-Pambula Bulldogs	1975	Pambula Sporting Complex	1	3	1980, 1993, 2023 (1927 Far South sub-group as Pambula-Merimbula)
Moruya Sharks	1925	Ack Weyman Oval	0	5	1989, 1998, 2013, 2015, 2016
Narooma Devils	1929	Bill Smythe Memorial Oval	3	6	1951, 1952, 1955 (Northern); 1999, 2003, 2004, 2005, 2009, 2012
Tathra Sea Eagles	1926	Lawrence Park	3	3	1951, 1952, 1953 (Imlay); 2019, 2025, 2026

=== Former clubs ===
Former clubs that once played in the area include:

- Alpine Wanderers
- Bodalla
- Candelo-Bemboka Panthers
- Cobargo-Bermagui Eels
- Delegate Tigers
- Milton-Ulladulla Bulldogs
- Snowy River Bears
- Tuross Lakers

== Map ==
Local Area	in New South Wales
Locations of the current Group 16 clubs.	Relation to state & national capitals

== Premiers ==
=== First-grade premiers ===
Season	Grand Final information			Minor Premiers
Season	Premiers	Score	Runners-up	Minor Premiers
1956	Bega Rovers	8–2	Cobargo-Bermagui Eels
1957	Bemboka	5–0	Candelo	Bemboka
1958	Bemboka	27–0	Eden Tigers	Bemboka
1959	Eden Tigers	3–2	Bemboka	Eden Tigers
1960	Bemboka	10–3	Eden Tigers	Eden Tigers
1961	Bemboka	10–3	Tathra Sea Eagles	Tathra Sea Eagles
1962	Bemboka	3–0	Tathra Sea Eagles	Bemboka
1963	Eden Tigers	14–5	Tathra Sea Eagles	Tathra Sea Eagles
1964	Bodalla	4–2	Bemboka	Bodalla
1965	Candelo	17–9	Bemboka	Tathra Sea Eagles
1966	Bega Roosters	9–7	Moruya Sharks	Moruya Sharks
1967	Batemans Bay Tigers	7–0	Bega Roosters	Batemans Bay Tigers
1968	Pambula	13–8	Batemans Bay Tigers	Bega Roosters
1969	Candelo-Bemboka Panthers	16–4	Moruya Sharks	Candelo-Bemboka Panthers
1970	Candelo-Bemboka Panthers	15–8	Bega Roosters	Bega Roosters
1971	Bega Roosters	11–7	Eden Tigers	Eden Tigers
1972	Bega Roosters	12–7	Tathra Sea Eagles	Tathra Sea Eagles
1973	Candelo-Bemboka Panthers	13–3	Bombala Blue Heelers	Candelo-Bemboka Panthers
1974	Candelo-Bemboka Panthers	26–10	Bombala Blue Heelers	Bombala Blue Heelers
1975	Candelo-Bemboka Panthers	13–10	Bombala Blue Heelers	Candelo-Bemboka Panthers
1976	Bombala Blue Heelers	12–4	Delegate	Bombala Blue Heelers
1977	Bombala Blue Heelers	9–8	Eden Tigers	Bega Roosters
1978	Eden Tigers	24–3	Cooma Stallions	Cooma Stallions
1979	Bombala Blue Heelers	14–2	Bega Roosters	Snowy River Bears
1980	Merimbula-Pambula Bulldogs	19–7	Snowy River Bears	Snowy River Bears
1981	Eden Tigers	8–6	Bega Roosters	Bombala Blue Heelers
1982	Eden Tigers	7–4	Snowy River Bears	Snowy River Bears
1983	Bombala-Delegate	15–7	Bega Roosters	Bombala-Delegate
1984	Cooma Stallions	12–9	Bombala-Delegate	Bombala-Delegate
1985	Bega Roosters	14–8	Narooma Devils	Bega Roosters
1986	Bega Roosters	9–8	Bombala-Delegate	Bega Roosters
1987	Bega Roosters	20–6	Merimbula-Pambula Bulldogs	Bega Roosters
1988	Bega Roosters	28–6	Cooma Stallions	Bega Roosters
1989	Moruya Sharks	38–10	Cooma Stallions	Moruya Sharks
1990	Bega Roosters	14–6	Snowy River Bears	Narooma Devils
1991	Bombala Blue Heelers	28–22	Bega Roosters	Bombala Blue Heelers
1992	Eden Tigers	16–14	Cooma Stallions	Eden Tigers
1993	Merimbula-Pambula Bulldogs	13–4	Eden Tigers	Eden Tigers
1994	Cooma Stallions	14–8	Bega Roosters	Bega Roosters
1995	Eden Tigers	28–2	Cooma Stallions	Cooma Stallions
1996	Snowy River Bears	18–0	Eden Tigers	Eden Tigers
1997	Eden Tigers	23–8	Moruya Sharks	Eden Tigers
1998	Moruya Sharks	36–14	Eden Tigers	Moruya Sharks
1999	Narooma Devils	12–11	Bombala Blue Heelers	Narooma Devils
2000	Bega Roosters	18–19	Bombala Blue Heelers	Bega Roosters
2001	Bega Roosters	12–8	Tathra Sea Eagles	Bega Roosters
2002	Eden Tigers	21–6	Tathra Sea Eagles	Eden Tigers
2003	Narooma Devils	40–2	Eden Tigers	Narooma Devils
2004	Narooma Devils	42–24	Moruya Sharks	Narooma Devils
2005	Narooma Devils	18–14	Cooma Stallions	Eden Tigers
2006	Eden Tigers	28–8	Cooma Stallions	Cooma Stallions
2007	Eden Tigers	30–22	Bombala Blue Heelers	Eden Tigers
2008	Eden Tigers	32–8	Bega Roosters	Eden Tigers
2009	Narooma Devils	56–32	Cooma Stallions	Narooma Devils
2010	Eden Tigers	18–10	Bega Roosters	Cooma Stallions
2011	Eden Tigers	18–4	Bega Roosters	Eden Tigers
2012	Narooma Devils	20–14	Moruya Sharks	Moruya Sharks
2013	Moruya Sharks	14–10	Bega Roosters	Moruya Sharks
2014	Bega Roosters	28–8	Narooma Devils	Moruya Sharks
2015	Moruya Sharks	50–12	Bega Roosters	Moruya Sharks
2016	Moruya Sharks	24–14	Bega Roosters	Moruya Sharks
2017	Cooma Stallions	38–18	Bombala Blue Heelers	Cooma Stallions
2018	Bombala Blue Heelers	14–12	Bega Roosters	Bega Roosters
2019	Tathra Sea Eagles	24–18	Bega Roosters	Bega Roosters
2020 season cancelled due to COVID-19 pandemic
2021	2021 Finals Series and Grand Final cancelled due to COVID-19 pandemic			Merimbula-Pambula Bulldogs
2022	Bega Roosters	24–14	Tathra Sea Eagles	Bombala Blue Heelers
2023	Merimbula-Pambula Bulldogs	38–18	Tathra Sea Eagles	Eden Tigers
2024	Snowy River Bears	20–12	Eden Tigers	Eden Tigers
2025	Tathra Sea Eagles	30–18	Merimbula-Pambula Bulldogs	Merimbula-Pambula Bulldogs
2026	Tathra Sea Eagles	12–11	Bega Roosters	Merimbula-Pambula Bulldogs

== Juniors ==
=== Batemans Bay Tigers ===
- Ben Cross
- Matthew Cross

=== Bega Roosters ===
- Dale Finucane
- Kezie Apps
- Deon Apps

=== Bombala Blue Heelers ===
- Ky Rodwell

=== Cooma Stallions ===
- Brett White
- Sam Williams
- Jack Williams
- Zac Saddler

=== Merimbula-Pambula Bulldogs ===
- Euan Aitken
- Wayne Collins
- Tony Paton
- Pat Coman
- Scott Gammell
- Ben Duckworth
- Tommy Hughes

=== Moruya Sharks ===
- Michael Weyman
- Tim Weyman
- Jarrad Kennedy
- Rhys Kennedy

=== Narooma Devils ===
- Chris Houston
- Michael Lett
- Teig Wilton

=== Tathra Sea Eagles ===
- Adam Elliott

=== Eden Tigers ===
- Corey Stewart
- Brett Kelly
- Peter Kelly

== Sub-Group Competitions ==
From the mid-1920s to the mid-1950s Rugby League was played in what became known as sub-group competitions.

=== Far South Coast / Northern Sub-Group ===
This competition began as the Far South Coast Rugby League in 1925, with Wyndham Oaks, Bega Waratahs, Bega Federals, Candelo, Pambula Buccaneers and Eden as the competing teams. In 1937 the first grade competition was not held, with teams playing challenge cup matches instead, although a reserve grade competition was held. Following the 1940 Grand Final, competition was suspended due to World War Two.

Competition resumed in 1946.

Season	Grand Final information				Minor Premiers
Season	Premiers	Score	Runners-up	Report	Minor Premiers
1925	Wyndham	No Finals
1926	Bega Federals	No Finals
1927	Pambula-Merimbula	4–2	Quaama		Pambula
1928	Quaama	9–3	Bega		Quaama
1929	Candelo	5–3	Pambula
1930	Candelo	7–5	Cobargo		Candelo
1931	Bega	18–0	Candelo		Bega
1932	Candelo	14–4	Merimbula
1933	Candelo	3–3	Bega Rovers		Candelo
1934	Bega Rovers	13–2	Candelo		Bega
1935	Bega Rovers	5–5	Candelo		Bega
1936	Bega Rovers	21–4	Cobargo
1938	Cobargo	9–5	Bermagui		Cobargo
1940	Batemans Bay	18–5	Cobargo		Batemans Bay
1946	Cobargo	17–8	Dry River		Dry River
1947	Bega Rovers	14–10	Cobargo		Bega Rovers
1948	Batemans Bay	20–4	Cobargo		Batemans Bay
1949	Dry River-Cobargo	23–7	Batemans Bay
1950	Cobargo-Dry River	5–4	Batemans Bay
1951	Narooma	9–6	Bega Rovers
1952	Narooma	19–0	Bega Rovers		Narooma
1953	Batemans Bay	2–0	Bega Rovers		Batemans Bay
1954	Bega Rovers	13–6	Batemans Bay		Bega Rovers
1955	Narooma	10–0	Batemans Bay
1956	Cobargo-Bermagui Eels	–

=== Pambula / Imlay ===
A competition centred around Pambula was held in 1933. Four teams contested the 1936 season: Pambula, Eden, Wolumla and Burragate.

The 1947 Imlay Rugby League competition included Bemboka, Candelo, Eden, Pambula, Tathra, Wolumla and Wyndham. The Bega Rovers and Bega Wests switched from the Northern Sub-Group to the Imlay League in 1955.

Season	Grand Final information				Minor Premiers
Season	Premiers	Score	Runners-up	Report	Minor Premiers
1933	Wyndham	12–2	Pambula		Pambula
1934	Wolumla	7–7	Pambula
1936	Pambula	7–6	Eden
1937	Pambula Old Boys	7–0	Wyndham
1938	Merimbula	9–6	Pambula
1940	Wolumla	–	Merimbula
1947	Eden	7–4	Bemboka
1948	Candelo	5–4	Bemboka		Candelo
1949	Eden	6–4	Bemboka		Bemboka
1950	Bemboka	6–4	Wolumla		Wolumla
1951	Tathra	11–4	Eden		Eden
1952	Tathra	6–3	Eden		Eden
1953	Tathra	4–2	Eden		Tathra
1954	Eden	14–4	Tathra		Tathra
1955	Bemboka	10–2	Tathra
1956	Bega Rovers	12–7	Bega Wests		Bega Rovers

=== Southern Monaro ===
The four towns of Bibbenluke, Bombala, Cathcart and Delegate regularly played Rugby Union matches in the early decades of the 20th century. The clubs trialed league rules in 1928 but returned to Union in 1929. In 1932, however, Southern Monaro Rugby League was established as a sub-group of Group 16. In 1935, the three first grade teams became two by the end of the season. Bombala fielded two teams (Blues and Blacks), and Nimmitabel joined to make a five team 1936 competition. From 1937, the clubs reverted to challenge cup matches.

Season	Grand Final information				Minor Premiers
Season	Premiers	Score	Runners-up	Report	Minor Premiers
1932	Bombala	9–3	Bibbenluke		Bombala
1933	Bombala	6–2	Bibbenluke
1934	Bombala	3–0	Bibbenluke		Bibbenluke
1935	Bombala	9–7	Bibbenluke
1936	Bombala Blacks	9–2	Bibbenluke

== Group 19 Rugby League (1950–1970) ==
A senior Rugby League competition under the enumeration Group 19 ran from the post-war years until 1970. Participating teams included Bibbenluke, Bombala, Delegate, Jindabyne and (usually) Adaminaby. In most seasons two or three Cooma teams participated – the Cooma Rovers and St Patricks, Cooma Blues or Cooma Citizens. Employees engaged in the Snowy River Scheme fielded teams for short periods – Public Service, Snowy and the intriguingly named Utah-Island Bend.

In 1971 the northern Group 19 clubs – Cooma Rovers, Adaminaby, Jindabyne, Cooma Citizens and Nimmitabel agreed to combine playing resources and field a team in the Group 16 competition, as the Alpine Wanderers. The three teams from southern Monaro also joined the combined competition, although they remained separate clubs.

The enumeration Group 19 was later redeployed to the northern tablelands of New South Wales, with teams from Armidale, Glen Innes, Guyra, Narwan, Uralla and Walcha competing under that banner in the 1980s.

== Sources ==
Years	Item	Via
1919 to 1954	Bombala Times	Trove
1928 to 1935	Southern Record and Advertiser	Trove
1950 to 1970	Cooma-Monaro Express	Microfilm at State Library of NSW
1946 to 1991	Bega District News	Microfilm at State Library of NSW
1967–69, 1971–96	Country Rugby League Annual Report	State Library of NSW
1970–74, 1976–2001	Rugby League Week	Bound copies at State Library of NSW
2002 to 2014	Rugby League Week	eResources at State Library of NSW
2010 to 2019	Various Newspaper Websites	As referenced
2015 to 2019	Group Rugby League past seasons	SportingPulse / SportsTG websites No longer available

== Juniors ==
=== Group 16 Minor League Clubs ===
- Batemans Bay Tigers
- Bega Roosters
- Bombala Blue Heelers
- Cooma Stallions
- Eden Tigers
- Merimbula-Pambula Bulldogs
- Moruya-Tuross Sharks
- Narooma Devils
- Tathra Sea Eagles

== See also ==
- Rugby League Competitions in Australia
