= Noah Martin =

Noah Martin may refer to:

- Noah Martin (politician)
- Noah Martin (rugby league)
