= Narooma =

- Town
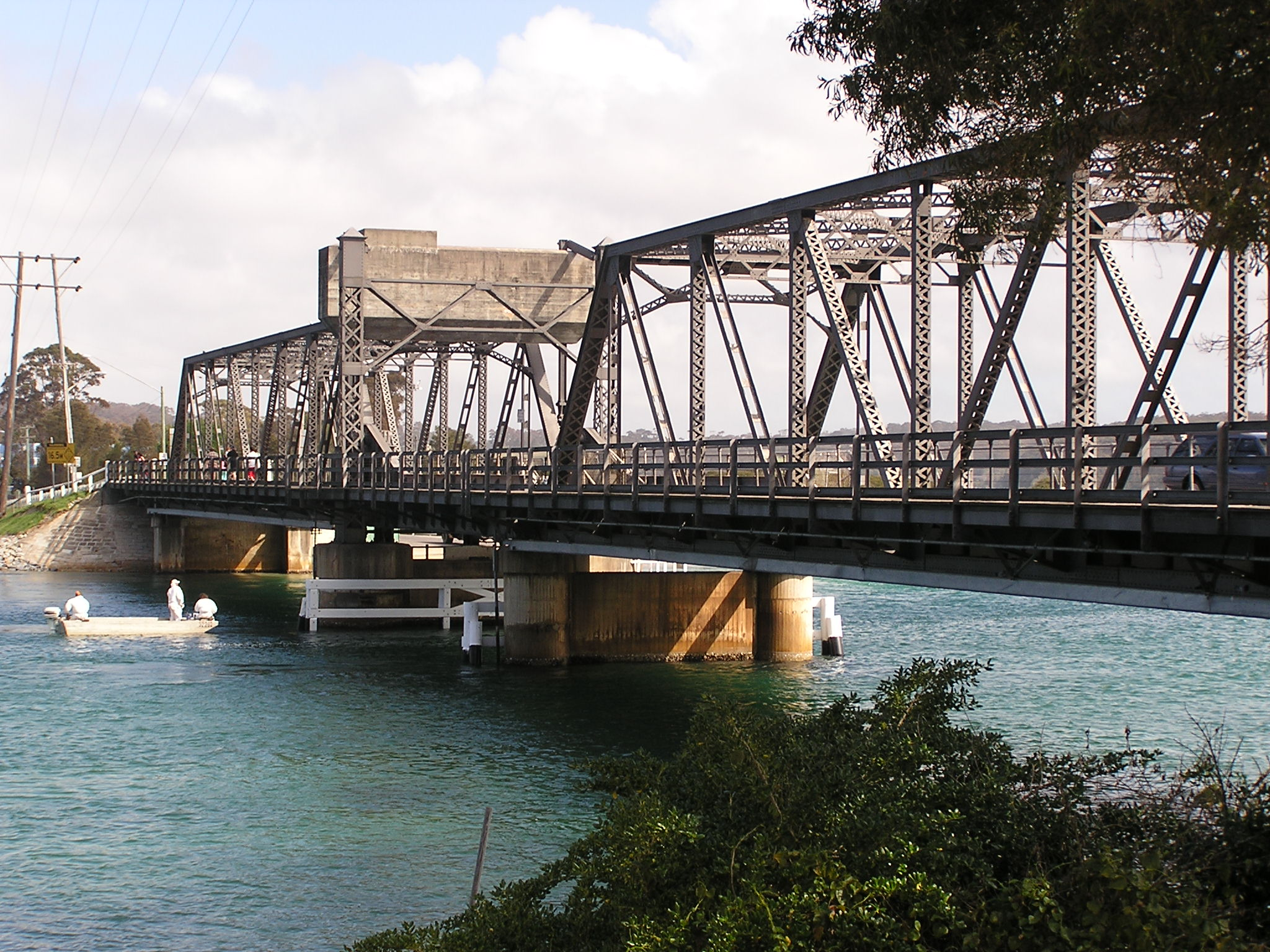
- Bridge at Narooma on the Princes Highway

- Coordinates: 36°12′S 150°08′E
- Country: Australia
- State: New South Wales
- LGA: Eurobodalla Shire
- Location: 51 km (32 mi) S of Moruya; 347 km (216 mi) S of Sydney; 77 km (48 mi) NNE of Bega; 225 km (140 mi) SE of Canberra; 148 km (92 mi) E of Cooma
- Established: 1881

Government
  - State electorate: Bega
  - Federal division: Eden-Monaro
- Elevation: 30 m (98 ft)

Population
  - Total: 3,342 (2016 census)
- Postcode: 2546
- County: Dampier
Localities around Narooma
Eurobodalla	North Narooma	Pacific Ocean
Tinpot	Narooma	Pacific Ocean
Dignams Creek	Corunna	Pacific Ocean

Narooma (/nəruːmə/) is a town in the Australian state of New South Wales on the far south coast. The town is on the Princes Highway, which crosses the Wagonga Inlet to North Narooma. The heritage town of Central Tilba is nearby to the south.

The name Narooma is said to be derived from a word in the local Aboriginal language (one of the Yuin dialects) meaning "clear blue waters".

At the 2016 census, Narooma had an urban population of over 3,000 people.

== History ==
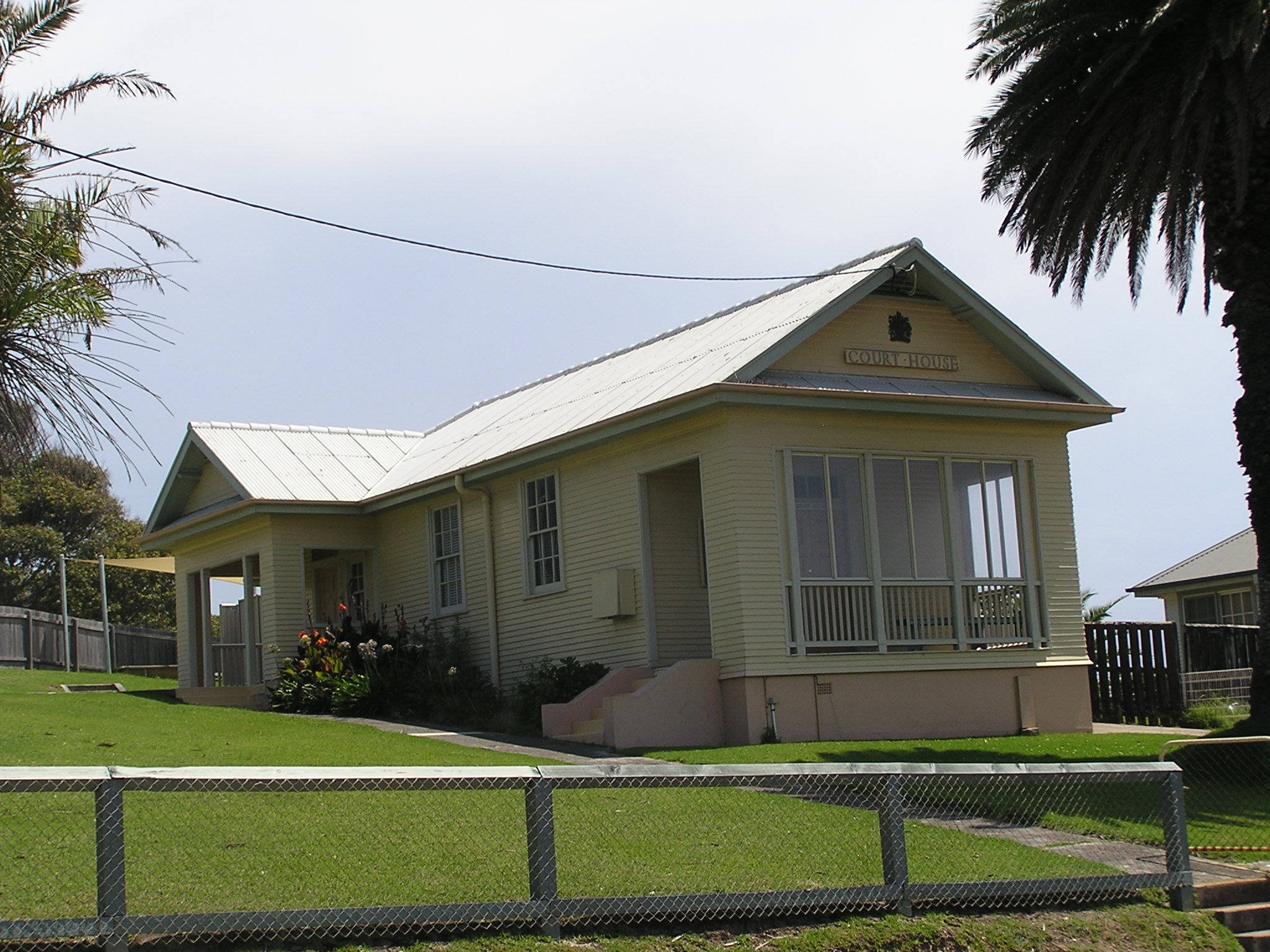
Narooma court house

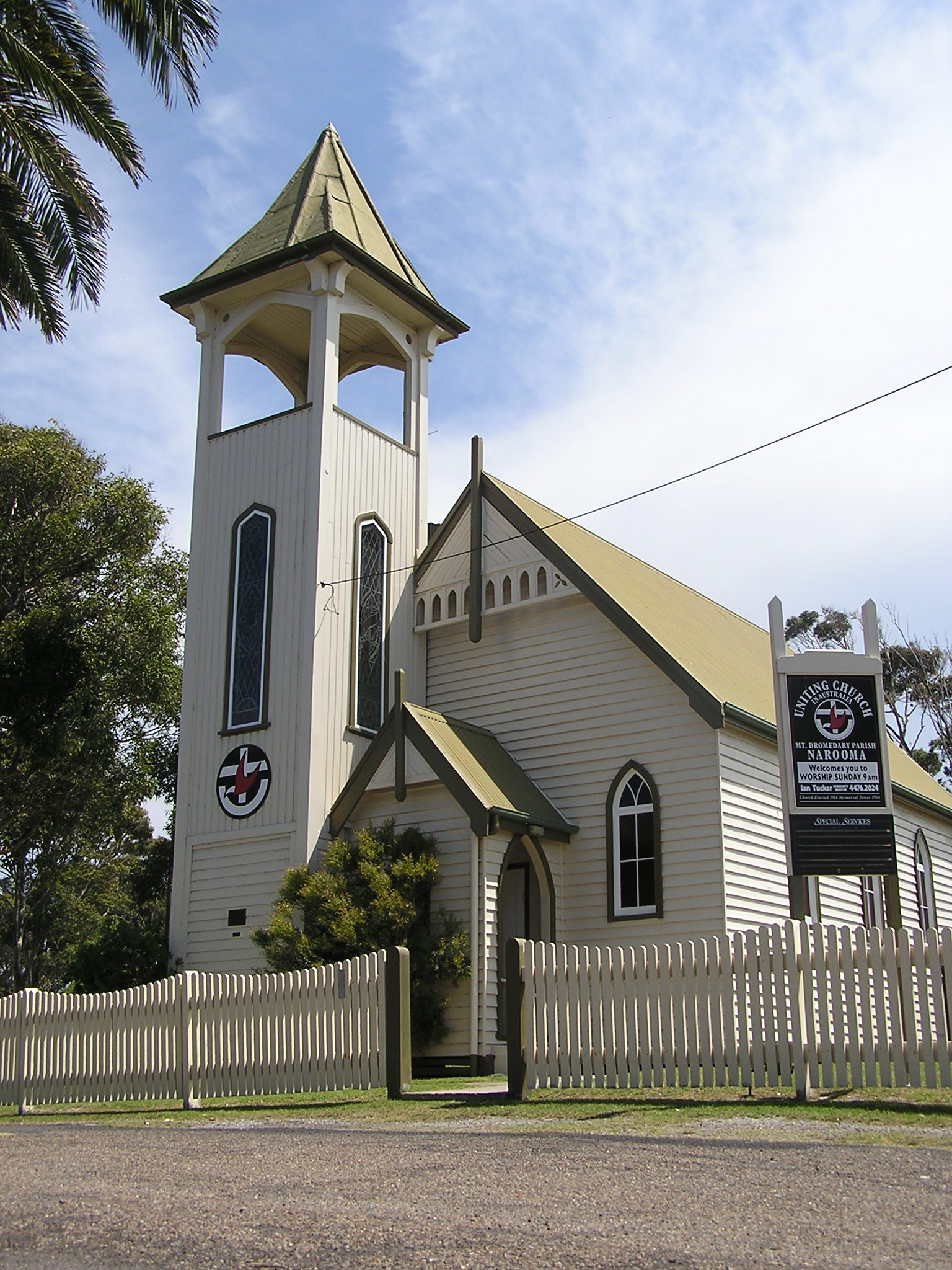
The Uniting Church built 1914

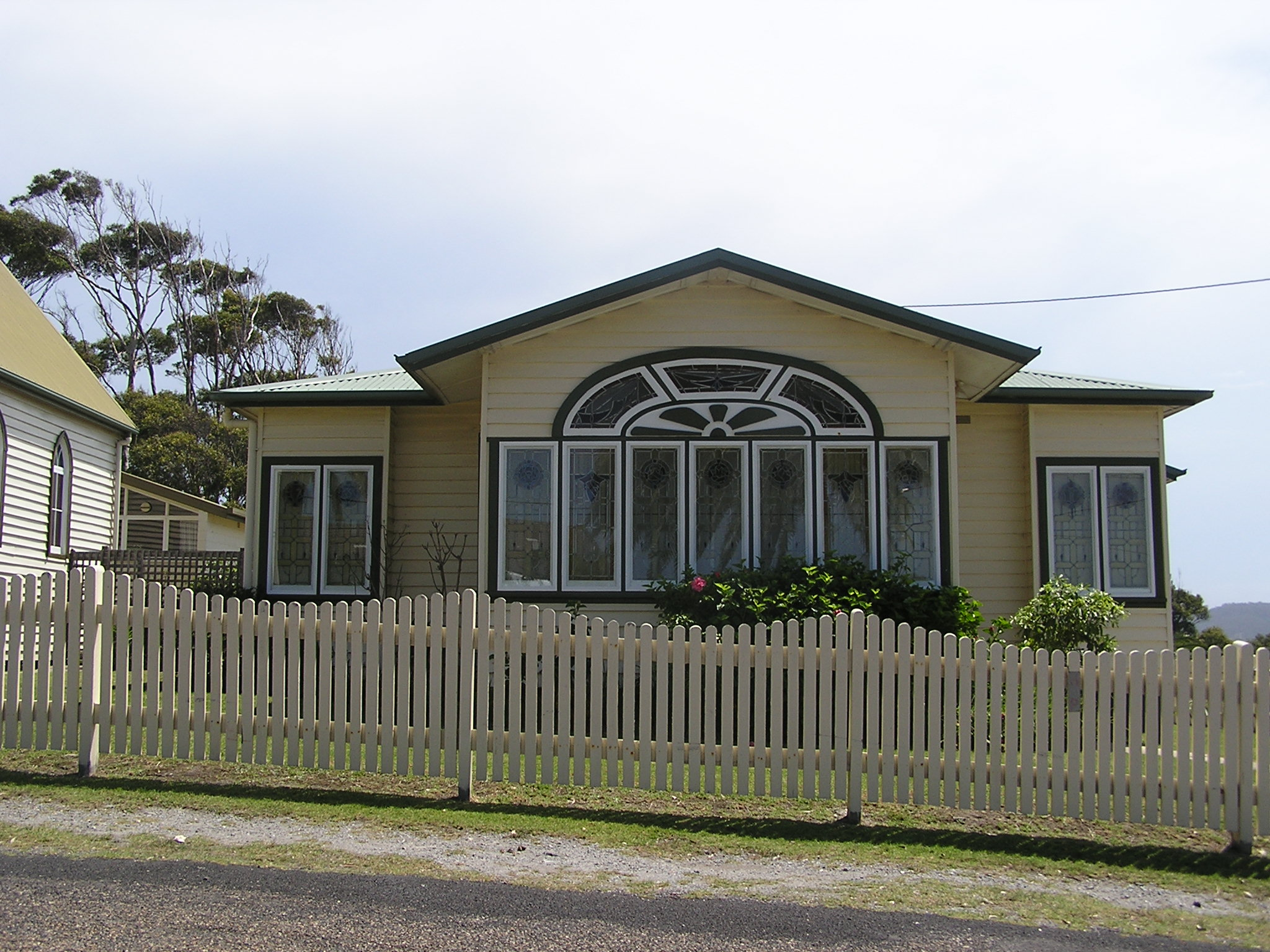
The parsonage associated with Narooma's Uniting Church

Before European settlement of the area, the Yuin people inhabited the lands along the stretch of coast, with the Walbunga/Walbunja clan being the traditional owners of the Narooma area. The name Narooma is said to be derived from a word in the local Aboriginal language meaning "clear blue waters". The language of the Walbunja was probably a dialect of Dhurga.

There had been an earlier settlement nearby at Punkalla, which was a port for Bodalla and Nerrigundah; a ruined jetty and timber mill can still be seen there. Gold was discovered nearby at Central Tilba in 1880 and a post office was opened at present-day Corunna (to the south, in Eurobodalla Shire), named "Noorooma".

A township was surveyed at the present location of Narooma in 1883 and given the name Noorooma, which it held until 1972. It was declared a port in 1884.

Its school opened in 1886 and its post office in 1889. Transport to Narooma was first from the sea. From 1894 a hand-worked punt crossed Wagonga Inlet, linking Narooma to North Narooma and on to Moruya. A daily mail coach ran through the town between Bega and Moruya.

Narooma was regarded as a tourist destination from the early twentieth century. The local oyster industry was established around 1900. The Uniting (formerly Methodist) Church on the Princes Highway dates from 1914. Together with the associated parsonage, it is regarded as an excellent example of the Australian Federation Carpenter Gothic architectural style.

In 1929, a petrol-driven punt, that had previously operated at Batemans Bay was installed. The Narooma bridge was the first major bridge constructed on the Princes Highway by the Main Roads Board as part of its efforts to develop the highway. The bridge was built between 1929 and 1931 and crosses the Wagonga Inlet. The bridge has three spans and is made of steel and concrete. It is one of two bascule span bridges of its type remaining in New South Wales in 2002; the other was being threatened with demolition in 2002. A footpath was added to the eastern (seaward) side of the bridge in 1960.

A fish cannery opened in 1937 or 1940 to process tuna and salmon.

In 1972, the name was officially changed from Noorooma to Narooma.

== Geology ==
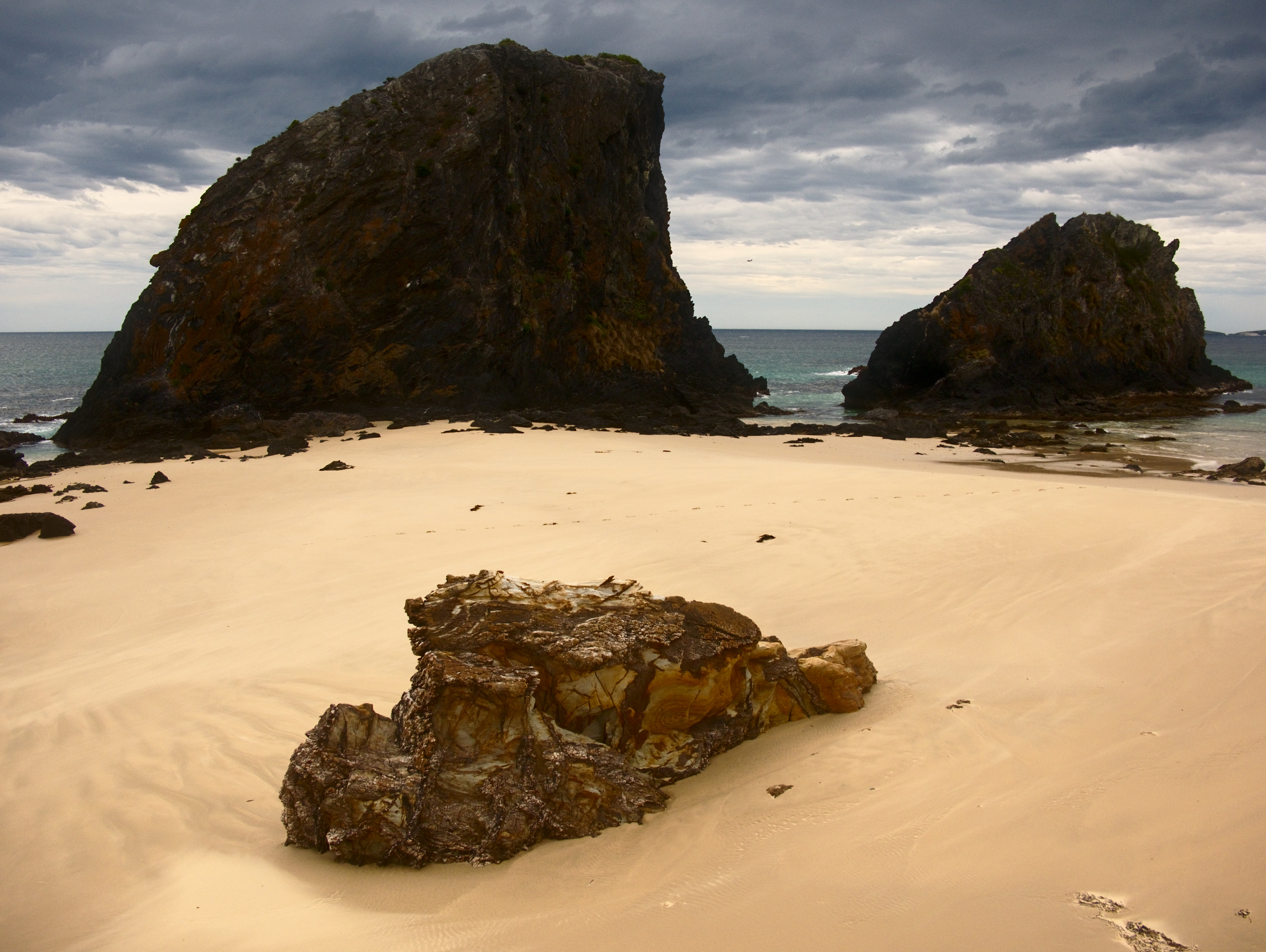
Glass House Rocks, near Narooma

Narooma is located on the Narooma terrane, which used to be separated by thousands of kilometres from the Australian coast. It travelled to the west and attached itself to the side of the Lachlan Fold Belt, which became part of Australia. The rock found near Narooma includes the Narooma Chert dating from Cambrian times, and turbidites. There are also the remains of a submarine volcano with pillow lava.

== Demography ==
At the 2016 census, Narooma had an urban population of over 3,000 people.

== Sport ==
The town is represented by a rugby league team Narooma Devils, who play in the local Group 16 Rugby League competition. The club was founded in 1929, and plays at Bill Smyth Memorial Oval in the centre of town, an Australian Rules team called the Lions, who play from Bill Smith oval, and Association Football (soccer team), Narooma FC as well as Netball, all sponsored by the local RSL. Mountain biking, is the most popular sport, with Narooma mountain bike trails and local trails heavily used.

== Attractions and landmarks ==
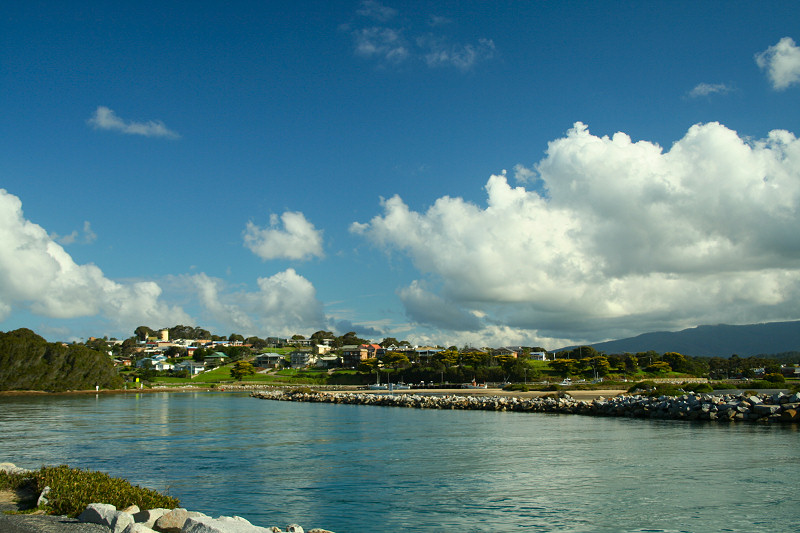
Narooma township as seen from Australia Rock

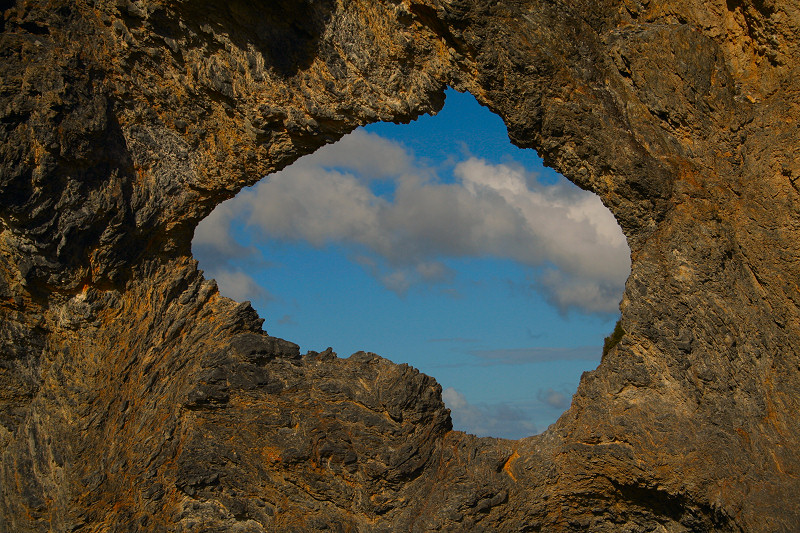
Australia Rock

Montague Island, a National Parks and Wildlife Reserve, is eight kilometres offshore from Narooma. Charter operators tour from Narooma onto and around the island.

Gulaga, also known as Mt. Dromedary, the name given by Captain Cook for its resemblance to the dromedary camel, can be reached from the village of Tilba Tilba. There are eight rainforest types on the mountain, and rock sites of significance to the local indigenous population. Views from the top of the mountain are limited by the vegetation. Beaches in the area include Dalmeny Beach, Narooma Beach, Bar Beach (flat water) and Yabarra Beach.

Australia Rock is found at the bar crossing (where the inlet empties into the sea). There are various explanations for how the rock formed into this continental likeness, early photos show that it is simply a natural result of thousands of years of erosion of the ancient chert and shale headland. One of the more interesting tales of how it formed, is that the hole was created inadvertently when a ship was moored to the heads with large chains.

The Narooma Golf Course was established in 1930 and has been rated amongst Australia's top 50 public access courses and Australia's top 25 resort golf courses. It is considered to be a spectacular and challenging course, with views of Montague Island to the east and Glass House Rocks to the south.

The Great Southern Blues Festival was held here annually on the October Long Weekend until it moved to Batemans Bay in 2010. The festival returned to Narooma in 2013, and continued to be held each year on the October Long Weekend until it ceased in 2015.

== Climate ==
Narooma has an oceanic climate (Cfb) with mild temperatures throughout the year. It is fairly sunny, getting 104.3 clear days annually. The town's drier, sunnier winters are owed to its position on the leeward side of the dividing range. Going by vegetation, Narooma is the southernmost subtropical climate in Australia, as the nearby Mount Dromedary and Gulaga National Park feature native subtropical vegetation.

Compared to other cities on the immediate coast of New South Wales, like Sydney and Wollongong, the city features a relatively low annual rainfall of 927.4 millimetres (36.5 in) – this is primarily owed to the progressively westward-bent landmass as one moves south on the coastline, and Narooma's position on this landmass occasionally shelters the city from intense Tasman lows and other rain-bearing systems from the east.

Climate data for Narooma (Marine Rescue) 1991–2020 averages, 1910–present extremes
Month	Jan	Feb	Mar	Apr	May	Jun	Jul	Aug	Sep	Oct	Nov	Dec	Year
Record high °C (°F)	43.8 (110.8)	39.8 (103.6)	38.9 (102.0)	34.0 (93.2)	27.3 (81.1)	23.2 (73.8)	25.3 (77.5)	27.5 (81.5)	35.0 (95.0)	36.2 (97.2)	38.4 (101.1)	39.5 (103.1)	43.8 (110.8)
Mean daily maximum °C (°F)	23.9 (75.0)	23.6 (74.5)	22.8 (73.0)	21.2 (70.2)	19.2 (66.6)	17.1 (62.8)	16.6 (61.9)	17.2 (63.0)	18.7 (65.7)	19.7 (67.5)	20.9 (69.6)	22.1 (71.8)	20.2 (68.4)
Mean daily minimum °C (°F)	17.1 (62.8)	17.2 (63.0)	15.7 (60.3)	13.4 (56.1)	10.5 (50.9)	8.4 (47.1)	7.1 (44.8)	7.6 (45.7)	9.4 (48.9)	11.5 (52.7)	13.7 (56.7)	15.5 (59.9)	12.3 (54.1)
Record low °C (°F)	9.4 (48.9)	10.0 (50.0)	7.0 (44.6)	6.1 (43.0)	3.3 (37.9)	1.1 (34.0)	0.6 (33.1)	0.5 (32.9)	0.8 (33.4)	2.0 (35.6)	5.0 (41.0)	7.5 (45.5)	0.0 (32.0)
Average precipitation mm (inches)	84.0 (3.31)	105.5 (4.15)	102.6 (4.04)	77.3 (3.04)	67.1 (2.64)	82.5 (3.25)	55.6 (2.19)	55.9 (2.20)	61.5 (2.42)	75.2 (2.96)	82.5 (3.25)	79.7 (3.14)	927.4 (36.51)
Average precipitation days	12.2	11.3	11.7	9.1	7.5	9.2	7.2	7.3	9.6	11.6	12.8	11.7	121.2
Average afternoon relative humidity (%)	73	74	69	67	63	61	59	57	63	68	72	72	67
Average dew point °C (°F)	16.6 (61.9)	17.0 (62.6)	15.1 (59.2)	13.0 (55.4)	9.9 (49.8)	7.8 (46.0)	6.6 (43.9)	6.5 (43.7)	8.8 (47.8)	11.1 (52.0)	13.1 (55.6)	14.6 (58.3)	11.7 (53.1)
Source 1: Bureau of Meteorology, Marine Rescue (1991–2020)
Source 2: Bureau of Meteorology, Marine Rescue (all years)

== Notable residents ==
- Stevie Wright – Member of the Easybeats
- Valentino Gusseli – Olympic snowboarder
- Teig Wilton – NRL player
- Justin Hemmes – Hospitality mogul
- Gerry Harvey – Australian Entrepreneur
