= Adam Elliott =

Australian rugby league footballer

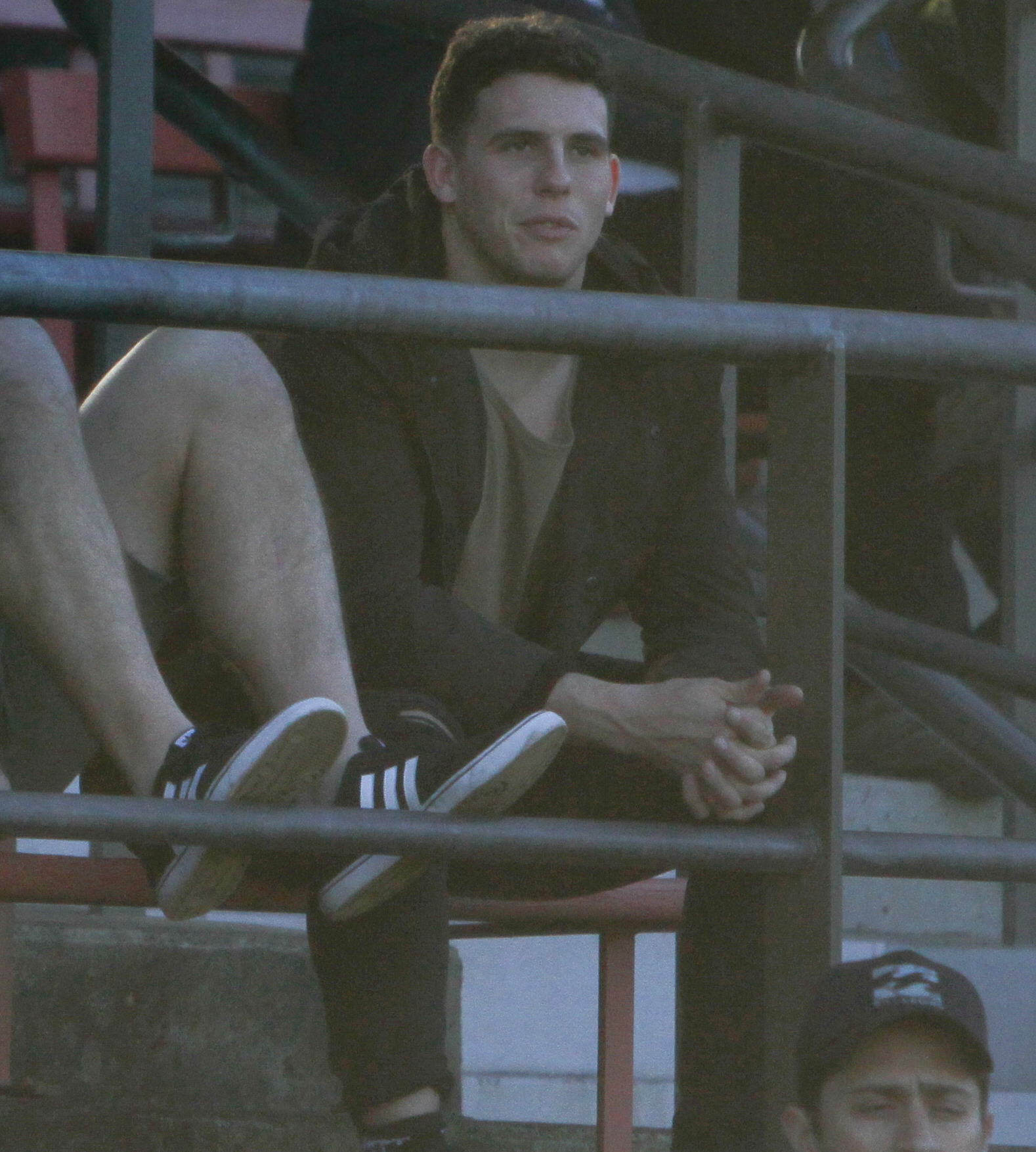

Personal information
- Born: 16 October 1994 (age 32) Bega, New South Wales, Australia
- Height: 185 cm (6 ft 1 in)
- Weight: 103 kg (16 st 3 lb)

Playing information
- Position: Lock, Second-row
Club
Years	Team	Pld	T	G	FG	P
2016–21	Canterbury Bulldogs	101	11	2	0	48
2022	Canberra Raiders	24	2	0	0	8
2023–25	Newcastle Knights	48	4	0	0	16
2026	South Sydney	7	1	0	0	4
	Total	180	18	2	0	76
Representative
Years	Team	Pld	T	G	FG	P
2015	NSW Residents	1	0	0	0	0
2017	Country NSW	1	1	0	0	4
2019–24	Indigenous All Stars	2	0	0	0	0
- Source: As of 4 September 2026
- Spouse: Millie Boyle

Adam Elliott (born 16 October 1994) is a former Australian professional rugby league footballer who played as a lock and second-row forward for the South Sydney Rabbitohs in the NRL.

He previously played for the Canterbury-Bankstown Bulldogs and Canberra Raiders in the National Rugby League.

He has played for Country NSW and the Indigenous All Stars sides.

== Background ==
Elliott was born in Bega, New South Wales, Australia and is of Indigenous Australian and Latvian descent.

He played his junior rugby league for the Tathra Sea Eagles and attended St Gregory's College, Campbelltown, playing in the college's GIO Schoolboys Cup side, before being signed by the Canterbury-Bankstown Bulldogs.

== Playing career ==
=== Early career ===
In 2013 and 2014, Elliott played for the Canterbury-Bankstown Bulldogs' NYC team, before graduating to their New South Wales Cup team in 2015.

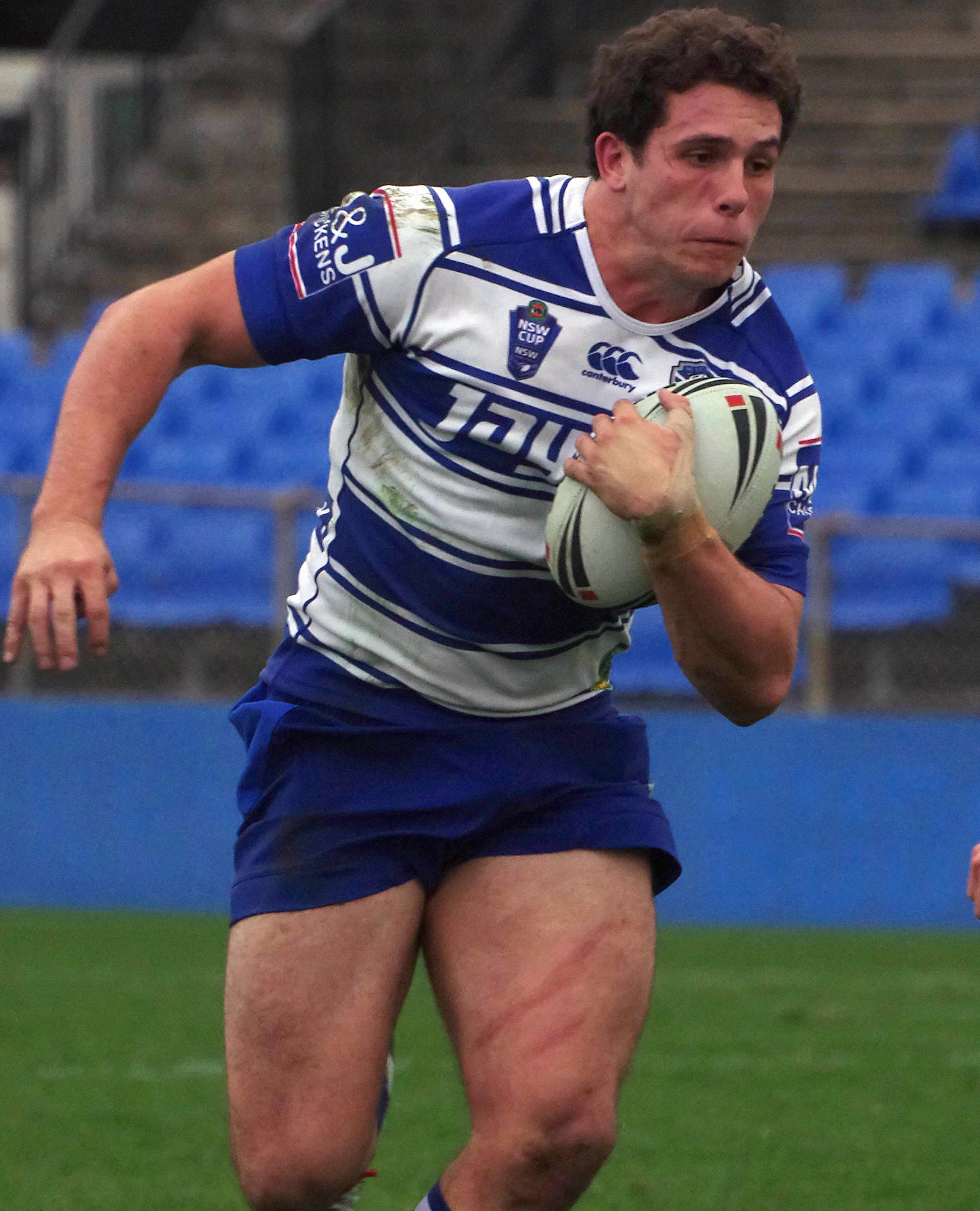
Elliott playing for the Bulldogs in 2015

On 3 May 2015, he played for the New South Wales Residents against the Queensland Residents. On 27 September 2015, he was named at second-row in the 2015 New South Wales Cup Team of the Year. On 3 November 2015, he re-signed with Canterbury on a two-year contract.

=== 2016 ===
In round 1 of the 2016 NRL season, Elliott made his NRL debut for Canterbury-Bankstown against the Manly-Warringah Sea Eagles.

=== 2018 ===
Elliott made 24 appearances for Canterbury in the 2018 season scoring 4 tries.

=== 2019 ===
Elliott made 20 appearances for Canterbury-Bankstown in the 2019 NRL season as the club struggled towards the bottom of the table. At one point the club was sitting last on the table and was in danger of getting the wooden spoon. For the third straight season however Canterbury achieved four upset victories in a row over Penrith, the Wests Tigers, South Sydney and Parramatta who were all competing for a place in the finals series and were higher on the table. Canterbury ended the season finishing 12th on the table.

=== 2020 ===
In round 8 of the 2020 NRL season, Elliott was taken from the field during Canterbury's 26–10 loss against Souths at Bankwest Stadium. It was later revealed that Elliott had dislocated his shoulder and would be ruled out for the season.

=== 2021 ===
On 15 February 2021, Elliott was involved in an incident with former NRL player Michael Lichaa and Lichaa's fiancée. The matter was referred on to the NRL integrity unit where Elliott avoided suspension and a fine. Elliott pledged to Canterbury that he would seek professional help in regards to his problems with alcohol.

On 10 September, Elliott and Canterbury came to a mutual agreement to end his playing contract with the club.

In late October 2021, Canberra Raiders signed Elliott to a 12-month contract, to resume his playing career in the 2022 NRL season.

=== 2022 ===
In June, Elliott signed a three-year contract with the Newcastle Knights starting in 2023.

=== 2023 ===
Elliott played a total of 18 matches for Newcastle in the 2023 NRL season as the club finished 5th on the table. Elliott played in both finals games as Newcastle were eliminated in the second week of the finals by the New Zealand Warriors.

=== 2024 ===
In round 2 of the 2024 NRL season, Elliott scored two tries for Newcastle in their 21-20 golden point extra-time loss to North Queensland. Elliott played 23 matches for Newcastle in the 2024 NRL season as the club finished 8th and qualified for the finals. He played in their elimination final loss against North Queensland.

=== 2025 ===
Elliott was limited to only seven appearances with Newcastle in the 2025 NRL season which saw the club finish with the Wooden Spoon.

=== 2026 ===
On 10 January, South Sydney announced that they had signed Elliott for the 2026 NRL season. Elliott was limited to just seven games for South Sydney in the 2026 NRL season. On 30 October, Elliott announced his official retirement from the NRL due to an ongoing ankle injury.

== Statistics ==
Year	Team	Games	Tries	Goals	Pts
2016	Canterbury-Bankstown Bulldogs	7			
2017	Canterbury-Bankstown Bulldogs	24	3	2	16
2018	Canterbury-Bankstown Bulldogs	24	4		16
2019	Canterbury-Bankstown Bulldogs	20	1		4
2020	Canterbury-Bankstown Bulldogs	8	1		4
2021	Canterbury-Bankstown Bulldogs	18	2		8
2022	Canberra Raiders	24	2		8
2023	Newcastle Knights	18			
2024	Newcastle Knights	23	4		16
2025	Newcastle Knights	7			
2026	South Sydney Rabbitohs	7	1		4
	Totals	180	18	2	76

== Controversies ==
=== Mad Monday ===
In September 2018, Canterbury held Mad Monday celebrations at The Harbour View Hotel in Sydney's CBD. Later in the evening, photographs provided by the media showed Canterbury players being heavily intoxicated, stripping naked and vomiting in the street. Elliott was handed a $25,000 fine (including $10,000 suspended) by Canterbury after nude images of him appeared in the media. Elliott was also handed a notice to attend court for wilful and obscene exposure.

On 17 December, at Sydney's Downing Centre Local Court, Elliott was handed a two-year good behaviour bond with no conviction recorded, for his role in the Mad Monday celebrations. He was also advised to seek help for his alleged cocaine use.

=== Restaurant incident ===
On 23 August, Elliott was stood down by Canterbury for the remaining two matches of the season after he was allegedly ejected from a Gold Coast restaurant for poor behaviour. On 26 August, Elliott was fined $10,000 by the NRL for bringing the game into disrepute. There were further allegations involving Elliott, which included that he had taken women's rugby league player Millie Elliott (née Boyle) into the men's toilet at the Gold Coast restaurant, where they kissed and he removed his shirt. The restaurant workers then asked both Adam and Millie Elliott to leave the premises.

=== Sex scandal ===
Best friend and former teammate Michael Lichaa caught his fiancée performing oral sex on Elliott, the court heard in 2022. Lichaa was taken to hospital with serious arm injuries from the altercation, after punching a window in an alcohol-fuelled rage. The incident, which was initially reported simply as "making out", drew comparisons to Australian rules footballer Wayne Carey, who infamously had sex with the wife of then-teammate and best friend Anthony Stevens in 2002 and was ousted from North Melbourne Football Club in disgrace.

"I couldn't get the image of my fiancée performing oral sex on my best friend out of my mind," Lichaa told the court. Lichaa lost 2.5 litres of blood after punching a window with his hand, with police describing the scene as a "bloodfest". Concerned neighbours, who reported hearing a man scream "I'm going to f***ing kill her", called triple zero.
