= Noah Martin (rugby league) =

Australian rugby league footballer

Personal information
- Born: 21 April 2005 (age 21) Lismore, New South Wales, Australia
- Height: 185 cm (6 ft 1 in)
- Weight: 96 kg (15 st 2 lb)

Playing information
- Position: Second-row
Club
Years	Team	Pld	T	G	FG	P
2025–	Canberra Raiders	17	6	0	0	24

Noah Martin (born 21 April 2005) is an Australian rugby league footballer who plays as a second-row for the Canberra Raiders in the National Rugby League (NRL).

== Background ==
Martin was born in Lismore, New South Wales. He spent the early years of his life in the Northern NSW town of Casino before his parents decided to pack the family up and travel around Australia. The family eventually settled in Eden on the NSW Far South Coast. He played his junior rugby league for the Narooma Devils in the Group 16 Rugby League.

== Playing career ==
Martin made his first grade debut from the bench in his side's 16−10 win over the New Zealand Warriors at Mount Smart Stadium in round 12 of the 2025 NRL season. Martin played 11 games for Canberra in the 2026 NRL season as the club finished 11th on the table and missed the finals.
