= Euan Aitken =

Scotland international rugby league footballer

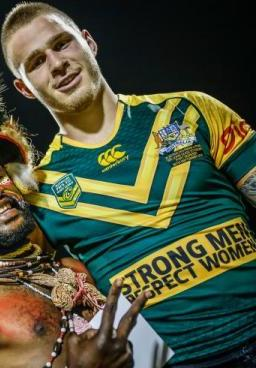

Personal information
- Full name: Euan Aitken
- Born: 16 June 1995 (age 31) Pambula, New South Wales, Australia
- Height: 182 cm (6 ft 0 in)
- Weight: 96 kg (15 st 2 lb)

Playing information
- Position: Centre, Second-row
Club
Years	Team	Pld	T	G	FG	P
2015–20	St. George Illawarra	121	39	0	0	156
2021–23	New Zealand Warriors	35	10	0	0	40
2023–24	Dolphins	36	6	0	0	24
2025–	South Sydney	32	8	0	0	32
	Total	224	63	0	0	252
Representative
Years	Team	Pld	T	G	FG	P
2015	Prime Minister's XIII	1	1	0	0	4
2016	Country NSW	1	1	0	0	4
2016–	Scotland	5	1	0	0	4
- Source: As of 4 September 2026

Euan Aitken (born 16 June 1995) is a Scotland international rugby league footballer who plays as a second-rower or centre for the South Sydney Rabbitohs in the National Rugby League (NRL).

He previously played for the Dolphins, the St. George Illawarra Dragons and the New Zealand Warriors in the National Rugby League, and the Australian Prime Minister's XIII and Country New South Wales rugby league team at representative level.

== Background ==
Aitken was born in Pambula, New South Wales, Australia. He is of Scottish descent through his paternal grandfather, Andrew, Latvian descent through his paternal grandmother, Regina, and Polish descent through his paternal grandmother's mother.

He played his junior rugby league for the Merimbula-Pambula Bulldogs and Shellharbour Sharks. He was then signed by the St. George Illawarra Dragons.

== Playing career ==
=== Early career ===
In 2013 and 2014, Aitken played for the St. George Illawarra Dragons' NYC team. In September and October 2013, he played for the Australian Schoolboys. On 28 April 2014, he was named to play for the New South Wales under-20s team to play Queensland, but had to pull out due to injury. On 18 October 2014, he played for the Junior Kangaroos against the Junior Kiwis. At the end of 2014, he was named the Dragons' NYC Player of the Year. In 2015, he moved on to the Dragons' New South Wales Cup team, Illawarra Cutters.

=== St. George Illawarra (2015 - 2020) ===
On 31 January and 1 February, Aitken played for the Dragons in the 2015 NRL Auckland Nines. In Round 3 of the 2015 NRL season, he made his NRL début for the Dragons against the Canberra Raiders, playing at centre in the Dragons' 22–20 win at Canberra Stadium. On 23 March, he re-signed with the Dragons on a two-year contract. In Round 6 against the Canterbury-Bankstown Bulldogs, he scored his first NRL career try in the Dragons' 31–6 win at ANZ Stadium. He finished off his début year in the NRL having played in 23 matches and scoring six tries for the Dragons. On 26 September, he played for the Prime Minister's XIII against Papua New Guinea, playing off the interchange bench and scoring a try in his team's 40-12 win at Port Moresby.

In February 2016, Aitken played for the Dragons in the 2016 NRL Auckland Nines. On 8 May, he played for New South Wales Country against New South Wales City, where he played at centre and scored a try. In Round 10 against the Canberra Raiders, he scored a try off a wayward pass from Canberra Raiders fullback Jack Wighton, just on the halfway siren in golden-point extra-time to win the match for the Dragons 16–12.

In 2017, Aitken was forced to miss Scotland's 2017 World Cup campaign due to injury.

Aitken made 23 appearances during the 2018 season, and scored 10 tries for St George as the club finished 7th on the table at the end of the regular season. St George had led the competition after 16 rounds before losing 6 of their last 9 games which was reminiscent to their 2017 season. Aitken missed out on playing in the club's finals campaign which saw them upset the Brisbane Broncos in week one of the finals before being eliminated the following week by South Sydney 13-12.

In Round 21 of the 2019 NRL season, Aitken made his 100th first grade appearance and scored a try as St George defeated the Gold Coast 40-28 at Kogarah Oval.

On 11 August 2020, Aitken signed a three-year deal to join the New Zealand Warriors starting in 2021.

=== New Zealand Warriors (2021 - 2022) ===
Aitken made his debut for New Zealand in round 1 of the 2021 NRL season against the Gold Coast at Central Coast Stadium. In the same match, Aitken picked up an ankle injury and was ruled out for four months.

In round 12 against North Queensland, Aitken scored two tries in a 29-28 defeat. In round 20, he scored two tries for New Zealand in a 18-16 victory over the Wests Tigers.

In March 2022, it was revealed that Aitken would be granted a release from his Warriors contract at the end of 2022, Aitken stating that he needs to remain living in Australia for family reasons. He later signed a two-year deal with the Dolphins, an upcoming club in 2023. Aitken made a total of 21 appearances for the New Zealand club as they finished 15th on the table.

=== Dolphins (2023 -2024) ===
In round 1 of the 2023 NRL season, Aitken made his club debut for the Dolphins in their inaugural game in the national competition, as the new club pulled off a major upset defeating the Sydney Roosters 28-18 at Suncorp Stadium. In round 7, he scored a try in the Dolphins 14-36 loss to the South Sydney Rabbitohs at Suncorp Stadium. In round 8, Aitken scored a try in the Dolphins 28-26 victory over the Gold Coast Titans at Suncorp Stadium.| In Round 9, Aitken scored a try in the Dolphins 30-31 loss to the Canberra Raiders at McDonalds Park, Wagga Wagga.

In September, the Dolphins' Inaugural Presentation Ball was held at Brisbane Convention and Exhibition Centre, and Aitken received the club's annual Academic Award for continued study in an MBA.

In July 2024, Aitken was ruled out for the rest of the season after suffering a pectoral injury in round 19.

=== South Sydney Rabbitohs (2025 - ) ===
On 12 August 2024, Aitken signed a three-year deal with the South Sydney Rabbitohs. On 22 December, he was ruled out for the first month of the 2025 season due to further pectoral surgery and did not play until round 6. Aitken played 14 matches for South Sydney in the 2025 NRL season which saw the club finish 14th on the table. Aitken played 18 games for South Sydney in the 2026 NRL season as the club finished 6th on the table and qualified for the finals.

== Personal life ==
Aitken married Kirsty Costello in November 2022. Their daughter was born on 26 September 2023.

== Statistics ==
Year	Team	Games	Tries	Pts
2015	St. George Illawarra Dragons	23	6	24
2016	St. George Illawarra Dragons	22	7	28
2017	St. George Illawarra Dragons	12	6	24
2018	St. George Illawarra Dragons	23	10	40
2019	St. George Illawarra Dragons	24	6	24
2020	St. George Illawarra Dragons	17	4	16
2021	New Zealand Warriors	14	7	28
2022	New Zealand Warriors	21	3	12
2023	Dolphins	21	4	16
2024	Dolphins	15	2	8
2025	South Sydney Rabbitohs	14	2	8
2026	South Sydney Rabbitohs	2		
	Totals	208	57	228
