= Pambula =

- Town
- Coordinates: 36°55′S 149°53′E
- Country: Australia
- State: New South Wales
- LGA: Bega Valley Shire
- Location: 454 km (282 mi) S of Sydney; 33 km (21 mi) S of Bega; 81 km (50 mi) E of Bombala; 15 km (9.3 mi) N of Eden

Government
  - State electorate: Bega
  - Federal division: Eden-Monaro
- Elevation: 10 m (33 ft)
- Postcode: 2549
- County: Australia
- Parish: Pambula

Pambula /ˈpæmbjuːlə/ is a town on the far south coast of New South Wales, Australia 454 kilometres (282 mi) south of Sydney via the Princes Highway. At the 2016 census, Pambula had a population of 970 people. Pambula is now part of the Bega Valley Shire.

== History ==
The area underwent significant change with sea level rise 18,000 to 7,500 years ago which completely displaced inhabitants of previous coastal areas and resulted in dramatic changes in distributions of peoples. Aboriginal people lived over the area, with shell middens dating back 3000 years. At the time of contact with colonial settlers, the Thaua Aboriginal people lived in the area. In 1797, the European voyager George Bass explored the area.

The name Pambula is derived from its Dharwa name, pronounced "panboola", meaning 'twin waters'. The name was also spelled 'Panbula' by colonial settlers, although Pambula came to be used for postal purposes. Pambula had become the more commonly used name, by 1915. The official name, recorded by the Lands Department and Geographical Names Board, only changed, from Panbula to Pambula, in September 1967.

Pambula is a historic village with its first European settlers thought to have been the Imlay brothers who established cattle runs on the Pambula River flats in the 1830s. The village of Pambula situated on the flats near the river was planned in 1843 by surveyor Thomas Scott Townsend and the first school and churches were built there but frequent flooding led to the village being relocated to its present site on higher ground.

Captain John Lloyd RN acquired land in 1844 with his severance pay when he left the Royal Navy and built The Grange on the hill near the river. At about that time he invited the family of Syms Covington to move there. Covington had joined the second survey expedition of HMS Beagle as a fiddler and cabin boy. He became an assistant and manservant to Charles Darwin during the voyage and for a few years afterwards before emigrating to Australia. In 1854 he became Postmaster of Pambula and managed an inn called the Forest Oak Inn which still stands at a bend on the coast road.

The main land uses were grazing and agriculture. Tented accommodation on stock routes was replaced by slab and bark huts, then by more permanent buildings providing homes, housing, smithies and hotels. Pambula had five licensed hotels by 1856 and the foundation stone for the courthouse was laid in 1860. Pambula was proclaimed a town in 1885.

In 1888, gold was discovered and villages grew up around the mines at nearby Yowaka River and Pipeclay Creek. This created a boom in the town but in the early 20th century production of gold ceased and the prosperity of the town went into a decline.

William McKell, Premier of New South Wales from 1941-1947 and Governor-General of Australia from 1947-1953, was born in Pambula in 1891.

Pambula continued to be the dominant town of the district, providing facilities which came to include commercial premises, banks, courthouse, hospital, newspaper and a school of arts. Agriculture developed on the river flats, producing prize crops of maize and potatoes and a dairying industry became established. Timber felling was carried out in the surrounding forests and oyster farming was developed in the river.

== Heritage listings ==
Pambula has a number of heritage-listed sites, including:

- Princes Highway: Oaklands
- Princes Highway: Roan Horse Inn
- Northview Drive: The Historic Grange
- 42 Toallo St: Pambula Courthouse & Police Station

== Facilities ==
Pambula is situated approximately 4 kilometres (2 mi) south of Merimbula and has a small supermarket, a community bank and a primary school. The nearest secondary schools are a private secondary school in nearby Pambula Beach and a public secondary schools in Bega and Eden.

== Attractions ==
Panboola, the Pambula wetlands heritage project, is located between the south edge of town and the Pambula River. Panboola contains fresh water billabongs, saline areas around the former racecourse, saltmarsh and mangroves, plantings of thousands of trees, shrubs and ground covers, walking and cycle tracks and tables and seats.

Pambula is a significant producer of oysters.

== Sport ==
Pambula has a local cricket team, the Pambula Bluedogs. Their home ground is located at the Pambula Recreation oval in the town's centre. The Merimbula-Pambula Bulldogs, though named Merimbula are based in Pambula. Founded in 1924 they compete in the Group 16 Rugby League competition. The Pambula Sporting Complex is the home ground for the Pambula Panthers Australian Football Club founded in 1983. The ground is also the home ground for the soccer club, Pambula United Football Club, known as The Penguins. Located between Pambula and Merimbula is the 27 hole course Merimbula Golf Club.
