= Chris Houston (rugby league) =

Australian rugby league footballer

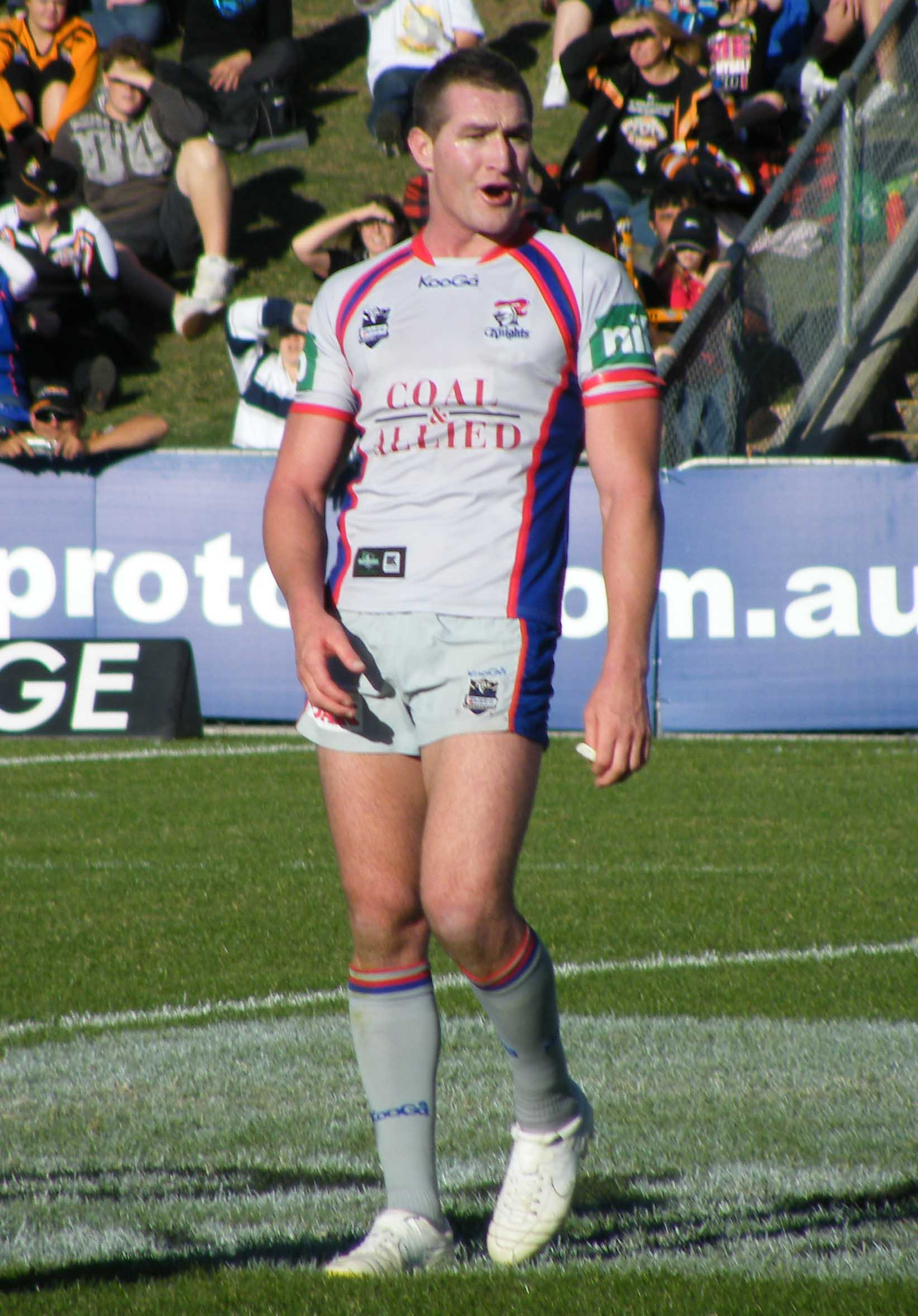
- Houston playing for the Knights in 2009

Personal information
- Full name: Christopher Houston
- Born: 15 February 1985 (age 41) Narooma, New South Wales, Australia

Playing information
- Height: 191 cm (6 ft 3 in)
- Weight: 102 kg (16 st 1 lb)
- Position: Second-row, Lock, Prop
Club
Years	Team	Pld	T	G	FG	P
2007	St. George Illawarra	16	0	0	0	0
2008–15	Newcastle Knights	160	27	0	0	108
2016–18	Widnes Vikings	68	6	0	0	24
	Total	244	33	0	0	132
Representative
Years	Team	Pld	T	G	FG	P
2011	NSW Country	1	0	0	0	0

Chris Houston (born 15 February 1985) is an Australian former professional rugby league footballer who last played for the Widnes Vikings in the Super League. He played as a second-row, lock and prop and previously played for the St. George Illawarra Dragons and Newcastle Knights in the National Rugby League.

== Background ==
Born in Narooma, New South Wales, Houston played his junior football for the Narooma Devils before being signed by the St. George Illawarra Dragons. Houston played for the Dragons' Premier League reserve-grade team in 2006.

== Playing career ==
In round 3 of the 2007 NRL season, Houston made his NRL debut for St. George Illawarra against the North Queensland Cowboys.

In late 2007, Houston signed a contract with the Newcastle Knights starting in 2008. In round 13 of the 2008 NRL season, Houston made his first appearance as a captain due to the Newcastle Knights regular captain Kurt Gidley and vice-captain Steve Simpson being unavailable for the match. In March 2010, Houston was served with a notice to attend court on charges of supplying ecstasy and cocaine. He voluntarily terminated his contract with the Newcastle club.

On 17 December 2010, Houston was cleared of all charges On 23 December 2010, due to being cleared of all charges, Houston signed a new two-year contract with the Newcastle Knights starting in 2011.

On 31 July 2012, Houston re-signed with Newcastle on a two-year contract.

Houston made 992 tackles in the 2012 season, averaging over 41 tackles a game, the most of any player in the National Rugby League.

On 31 October 2014, Houston re-signed with Newcastle on a two-year contract. On 2 December 2015, Houston signed a two-year contract with Super League side Widnes Vikings starting in 2016, after being told he was free to look elsewhere by incoming Knights coach Nathan Brown.

On 11 July 2017, it was announced that Houston had signed an extension of his contract with Widnes, keeping him at the club until the end of 2018.

== Representative career ==
In 2009, Houston was named 18th man for New South Wales in Game 3 of the 2009 State of Origin series, however he didn't play.

In 2011, Houston played for Country against City in the annual City vs Country Origin match.
