= Tim Weyman =

Australian rugby league footballer

Personal information
- Full name: Timothy Weyman
- Born: 18 July 1986 (age 39)

Playing information
- Position: Prop
Club
Years	Team	Pld	T	G	FG	P
2009	Cronulla-Sutherland	1	0	0	0	0
- Source: rleague.com profile As of 21 January 2019

Timothy Weyman (born 18 July 1986) is an Australian former professional rugby league footballer, who played for the Cronulla-Sutherland Sharks in the NRL. He was by preference a prop. He made one first-grade appearance for the Sharks in the 2009 NRL season, coming off the bench in a 56–10 loss at home to Wests Tigers. He is also younger brother of St. George Illawarra forward, Michael Weyman.

In 2016, Tim Weyman captain-coached the Moruya Sharks to a Group 16 Rugby League premiership and the NSW Country Rugby League's Clayton Cup.
