= Oaklands, Pambula =

Oaklands
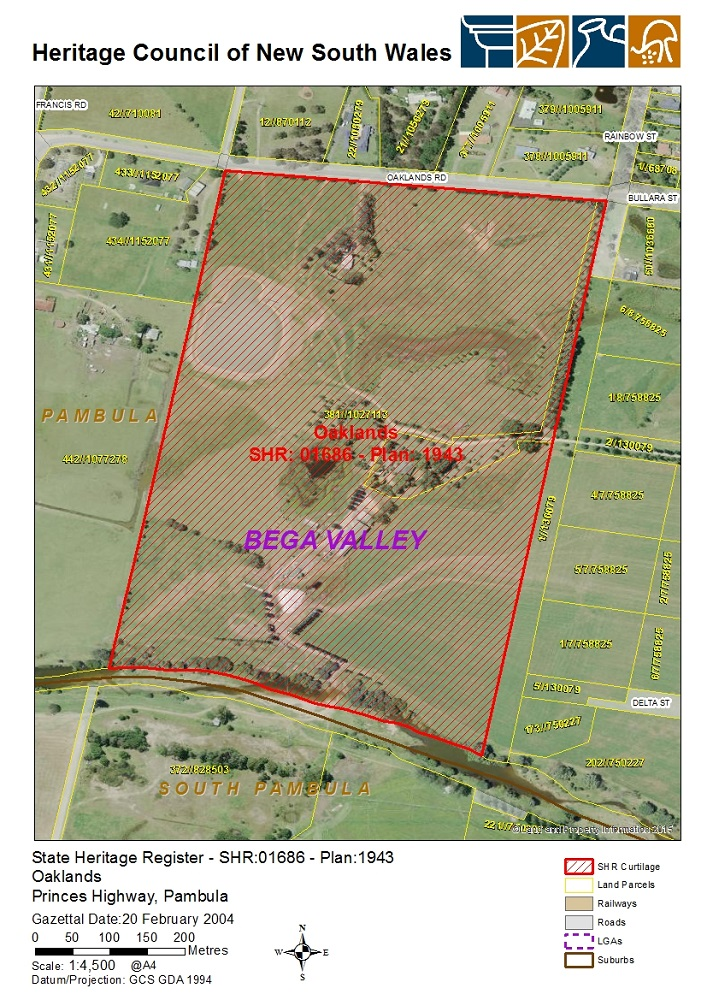
- Heritage boundaries

- Location within New South Wales Location within Australia
- 36.9332°S 149.8632°E
- Location: Princes Highway, Pambula, Bega Valley Shire, New South Wales, Australia

History
- Built: 1842–

New South Wales Heritage Register
- Official name: Oaklands; Pamboola Station (c1833-1842)
- Type: state heritage (landscape)
- Designated: 20 February 2004
- Reference no.: 1686
- Type: Farm
- Category: Farming and Grazing
- Builders: Messrs Robertson, Hall and Rogers

Oaklands is a heritage-listed homestead at Princes Highway, Pambula, Bega Valley Shire, New South Wales, Australia. It was built from 1842 by Messrs Robertson, Hall and Rogers. It was also known as Pamboola Station (c. 1833–1842). It was added to the New South Wales State Heritage Register on 20 February 2004.

== History ==
The original occupants of the area around Pambula and the Bega Valley were the Aboriginal group, the Djiringani. The first recorded European sighting of Aboriginal people near Pambula was by the surgeon, George Bass in his journal on 18 December 1797 when he sailed into the Pambula River to shelter from a southerly gale. The first recorded contact between Europeans and Aboriginal people on the South Coast was a meeting at Snug Cove in Twofold Bay in October 1798, between Matthew Flinders, on his voyage of exploration with George Bass, and a middle-aged Aboriginal man.

Displacement of Aboriginal people from their traditional lands began as cattlemen brought their herds south in the late 1820s. Permanent settlements were established in the 1830s and 1840s. Many Aboriginal people were killed by introduced diseases, and the 1844 census revealed an Aboriginal population on the South Coast of 535 with a high concentration in the Bega Valley. European settlement was slow due to the area's rugged topography and distance from Sydney. In 1846 the County of Auckland was proclaimed and the population of the area was estimated to be 1000 people. In 1848 there were only 17 Aboriginals in the Pambula area. Little evidence of pre-contact occupation survives except for middens of oyster shells on the banks of rivers and lakes.

The first major industry in the region was whaling which was begun by Thomas Raine in 1828 when he established the first whaling station at Twofold Bay. Shortly after, in 1834, the Imlay Brothers (Alexander, George and Peter) from Tasmania set up a large whaling station at Twofold Bay and extended their business interests to include coastal shipping and large-scale pastoral interests involving extensive leaseholds along the South Coast.

The Imlay Brothers were probably the first settlers in the Pambula area. Their estate, which was originally known as Pamboola Station, was first leased in 1833. In 1835 they built a substantial homestead at Kameruka, near Candelo, which has many features similar to the Oaklands homestead, built several years later.

In 1839 the Commissioner of Lands, John Lambie, recorded Pambula Station as an area of 28 square kilometres with 61 hectares of wheat and barley under cultivation, four slab huts and a stockyard.

The Imlays' pastoral and whaling interests were not successful and they became heavily indebted to Messrs William, Edward and James Walker, from Scotland. The Walker brothers, who also came to the South Coast via Tasmania, were the third largest shareholders in the Bank of New South Wales. They took over Pamboola Station in the early 1840s and erected the homestead in 1842 with convict labour and bricks. In 1844 the Walkers also took over Kameruka.

In January 1843, the Government Surveyor Thomas Scott Townsend, who was laying out the proposed township of Pambula, met with local pastoralist Benjamin Boyd and his employee, Oswald Walters Brierly, and Aboriginal guide, Toby. Brierly recorded, "You may conceive our pleasure when we came in sight of this beautiful spot and saw the bark huts of the station Here the Imlays have a pretty cottage". The proposed town layout that Townsend surveyed extended to the Pambula River and included the land on which Oaklands now stands which became Lot 12a, comprising 65 hectares.

Mary Mole, wife of the Eden harbourmaster, used to stop at Pamboola Station on her way to visit Kameruka.

Crown land sales in the new Pambula township took place in 1851. However, those sections of the proposed town nearest the river were flood-prone and did not develop. A major flood in 1851 washed away the small settlement and so the township was moved onto the higher ground to the north (even though the surveyed streets continued to appear on parish maps). Oaklands, situated on a rise, was not flood-affected.

In 1853 seven Sydney businessmen formed the Twofold Bay Pastoral Company and took over the Walker holdings, controlling more than 16,000 hectares in the Bega Valley. James Manning, a partner in the company, acquired Kameruka and Pamboola Stations, changing the name of the latter to Oaklands. He established an extensive garden and planted the oak (Quercus sp.) and olive trees (Olea sp.) which survive today. According to one source, James Manning built a large aviary near the homestead and when his estate was sold, the birds were released to become the ancestors of the thrushes, wrens and other English birds which now inhabit Australia.

In 1897 the Pambula Cooperative Creamery and Dairy Company was formed, along with the establishment of dairying as a major industry along the South Coast.

After James Manning died, the property was purchased by the Hayward brothers during the 1880s who developed the property as a dairy farm. In 1893 they were awarded first prize in the National Farm competition (The Voice 30/03/1894). The Voice reported that in front of the house there were olive trees 30 feet (9.1 m) high and oak trees 5 feet (1.5 m) in diameter and that the house consisted of 13 rooms. These probably included the conservatory, offices, servants wing and kitchen.

According to a previous owner, Mrs J. Bennett, the servants quarters, kitchen and conservatory were demolished in 1958 as they were in very poor condition.

Long-serving owners bought the property in 1967. In 1986 the present owners restored the remaining building and installed two bathrooms in what were storerooms. This has had little or no impact on the architectural integrity of the place.

In September 2000 the then-owners subdivided the property. The homestead now occupies 1.3 hectares but continues to overlook its former pastoral landholding.

In March 2006, Oaklands was put on the real estate market for the first time in 40 years.

== Description ==
=== Homestead ===
The original building comprised four main rooms with verandahs on all sides, several stores and pantries, and two ancillary rooms in the corners of the rear verandah. Adjoining were a conservatory, offices, servants quarters and kitchen. According to the Bega Valley heritage adviser, the house was constructed by convicts. The walls of hand made sun dried bricks, with identification frogs in the form of a thumb mark, are set on stone foundations. Four chimneys indicate the presence of extant fireplaces. The roof, originally shingled and now clad with corrugated iron, has hips on four sides. Verandahs are 2.75 m (9.0 ft) wide with rectangular posts with small mouldings and stop chamfers. At the sides and rear the verandahs are partly enclosed to form the two ancillary rooms.

The front door is a fine example of Georgian design and comprises a pair of cedar doors with side lights with diaper pattern glazing bars, surmounted by a fanlight. This is repeated halfway along the hallway. All the main rooms have cedar French doors onto the verandah with fine margin glazing and transom lights above. The interior is distinguished by high-quality cedar joinery, 6-panel doors, 12-pane windows, skirting boards (some 30 cm, some 45 cm) and architraves. The cedar fire surrounds demonstrate simple Georgian taste with plain corner blocks and semi-circular moulded pilasters and lintels. The floors are 20 cm (7.9 in) pit-sawn boards. Walls are hardset plaster with moulded cornices and ceilings are lathe and plaster with simple ceiling rosettes.

The homestead has two bedrooms, the main bedroom with ensuite, formal living and dining rooms, and a north-facing sunroom.

The building was reported to be in very good condition as at 28 March 2003. There is some archaeological potential relating to demolished outbuildings.

There is a high degree of architectural and material integrity in all the most significant aspects of the building. The facades present a very similar appearance to the original building. The interior cedar joinery appears to have little or no alterations and the original floor plan of the main house remains intact.

=== Grounds ===
Oaklands has 14,000 m^{2}. of gardens. The major garden features are two large oak trees (Quercus sp.), with girths of 6.4 metres (21 ft) and some mature olive trees, (Olea sp.) probably dating from the 1870s. These trees are mentioned as notable trees in the 1894 report in The Voice newspaper.

== Heritage listing ==
Oaklands is of state significance as a rare surviving intact colonial homestead in its curtilage from the late Georgian period. The house was originally sited on a rise to avoid flooding and to overlook the pastoral landscape and its own landholdings.

The main homestead, together with its associated out-buildings and immediate garden, is one of the oldest buildings in the Bega Valley and one of the earliest surviving colonial houses on the NSW South Coast. The house, built in 1842, demonstrates the early colonial settlement of the South Coast and the later development of the dairy industry as one of the major pastoral activities in the region.

The homestead features fine cedar joinery, including a highly unusual set of finely glazed entrance doors with corresponding antechamber doors, original fire surrounds, floorboards, plasterwork and French doors with fine glazing bars. The house retains a high degree of integrity and intactness and is considered to have one of the finest Georgian colonial interiors on the South Coast. Further research on its joinery may provide evidence of cultural and trade ties between NSW and Tasmania in this period.

The estate was developed as a dairy farm in the late nineteenth century. The olive trees (Olea sp.) and oak trees (Quercus sp.), after which the house was named, were planted in c. 1860s. The immediate garden also includes surviving post and rail fencing, and the house is sited to overlook the valley and to take advantage of pastoral views, thus forming an aesthetically distinctive landmark within the landscape of the South Coast.

Oaklands was listed on the New South Wales State Heritage Register on 20 February 2004 having satisfied the following criteria.

The place is important in demonstrating the course, or pattern, of cultural or natural history in New South Wales.

The homestead, built in 1842, is of state significance as one of the oldest buildings in the Bega Valley and one of the earliest surviving colonial houses on the NSW South Coast. The house and its curtilage are able to demonstrate the history of European settlement in the Bega Valley and the historical phases of pastoralism and then agriculture over a period of 170 years.

The original farm was until recently one of the oldest continuously operated farms in the region. Following subdivision in 2000, Oaklands is now cadastrally alienated from its farmland surroundings but it continues to overlook its former farmlands and maintains a close association with this early pastoral landscape.

The place has a strong or special association with a person, or group of persons, of importance of cultural or natural history of New South Wales's history.

Oaklands has historical associations with the following people of note in the history of the South Coast and the pastoral and fishing history of NSW. The Imlay brothers were the first owners of the estate and early settlers in the area. The Walker brothers built Oaklands and were well-known and successful Sydney merchants and wool exporters in the nineteenth century. James Manning, who was the third owner of Oaklands, was partner in the Twofold Bay Pastoral Company.

The place is important in demonstrating aesthetic characteristics and/or a high degree of creative or technical achievement in New South Wales.

The house is architecturally of state significance as an excellent example of colonial architecture in the style of Victorian Georgian with a high degree of refinement. This refinement is displayed in the symmetrical façade, the hipped roof, the finely glazed French doors, the front entrance door with sidelights, fanlight and corresponding interior door, the 12-pane windows, the fire surrounds and other fine interior cedar joinery. The house clearly demonstrates the high-level joinery skills of early builders and is indicative of the customs, habits, fashions and tastes of colonial life on the NSW South Coast.

The house is a typical Georgian homestead with the usual features but is distinguished by its interior detailing. It may be the finest Georgian house on the South Coast. In particular, the interior hall door which replicates the front entrance door is a fine and rare example of Georgian cedar joinery. A similar arrangement of hallway joinery survives at Kameruka, built by the Imlay Brothers c. 1835. This joinery possibly suggests the work of tradesmen and cedar brought from Tasmania.

The immediate garden features olive trees and oak trees dating from the 1860s/1870s. It retains early post and rail fencing, forming an aesthetically distinctive curtilage in the landscape of the region.

The house was originally sited on a rise to avoid flooding and to overlook the pastoral landscape and its own landholdings. While now cadastrally alienated from its original farmlands, the house still enjoys views over the surrounding land, which is still used for dairying. In this, the house retains its original relationship to the surrounding farmlands and forms a distinctive local landmark.

The quality and unusual features of its joinery are historically significant as indicative of the customs and habits, fashions and tastes of colonial society as well as demonstrating high-level joinery skills. The main house retains a high degree of intactness and is considered to have one of the finest Georgian colonial interiors on the South Coast.

Its architectural significance has been recognised by its listing as heritage item on the Register of National Trust of Australia (NSW)

The place has strong or special association with a particular community or cultural group in New South Wales for social, cultural or spiritual reasons.

Oaklands is of local social significance and plays a significant role in the local community's sense of place. This is demonstrated firstly by its listing as a heritage item on the Bega Valley LEP, secondly by its nomination for SHR listing by the Bega Valley Council and also by the local support offered to its nomination.

The place has potential to yield information that will contribute to an understanding of the cultural or natural history of New South Wales.

Oaklands is unlikely to display archaeological potential in relation to Aboriginal occupation before European settlement due to the disturbance of the site over time.

The house and immediate domestic garden have potential to yield further information on early colonial farming practices and lifestyles that may be of state significance. The interior fit out, particularly the cedar joinery, is able to demonstrate the tastes, material use and craftsmanship of the late Georgian era. The joinery possibly shares characteristics with that produced in Tasmania during the 1830s and 1840s. Further research may confirm this similarity and elaborate upon its significance, for example, whether this provides evidence of a trade relationship between Tasmania and NSW during this period.

The place possesses uncommon, rare or endangered aspects of the cultural or natural history of New South Wales.

Oaklands is of state significance as one of several surviving colonial 1840s homesteads in the Bega Valley district. The house is notable for its high degree of intactness and the quality of its internal finishes, particularly its cedar joinery which can be compared with other colonial homesteads in the region.

The hallway joinery with its interior screen matching that of the front entrance door is particularly notable. It is highly unusual and comparatively rare.

Oaklands is of state significance as a rare and intact surviving colonial homestead of the late Georgian period in NSW.

The place is important in demonstrating the principal characteristics of a class of cultural or natural places/environments in New South Wales.

Oaklands is a typical and excellent representative example of a Victorian Georgian homestead and one of few in the Bega Valley area. It displays many typical colonial architectural features, such as external symmetry, verandas on four sides, French doors onto the verandas, a front entrance with finely glazed sidelights and fanlight, and cedar interior joinery of a high standard, including typical Georgian fire surrounds, architraves and internal doors.
