= Jordan Martin =

Australian rugby league footballer

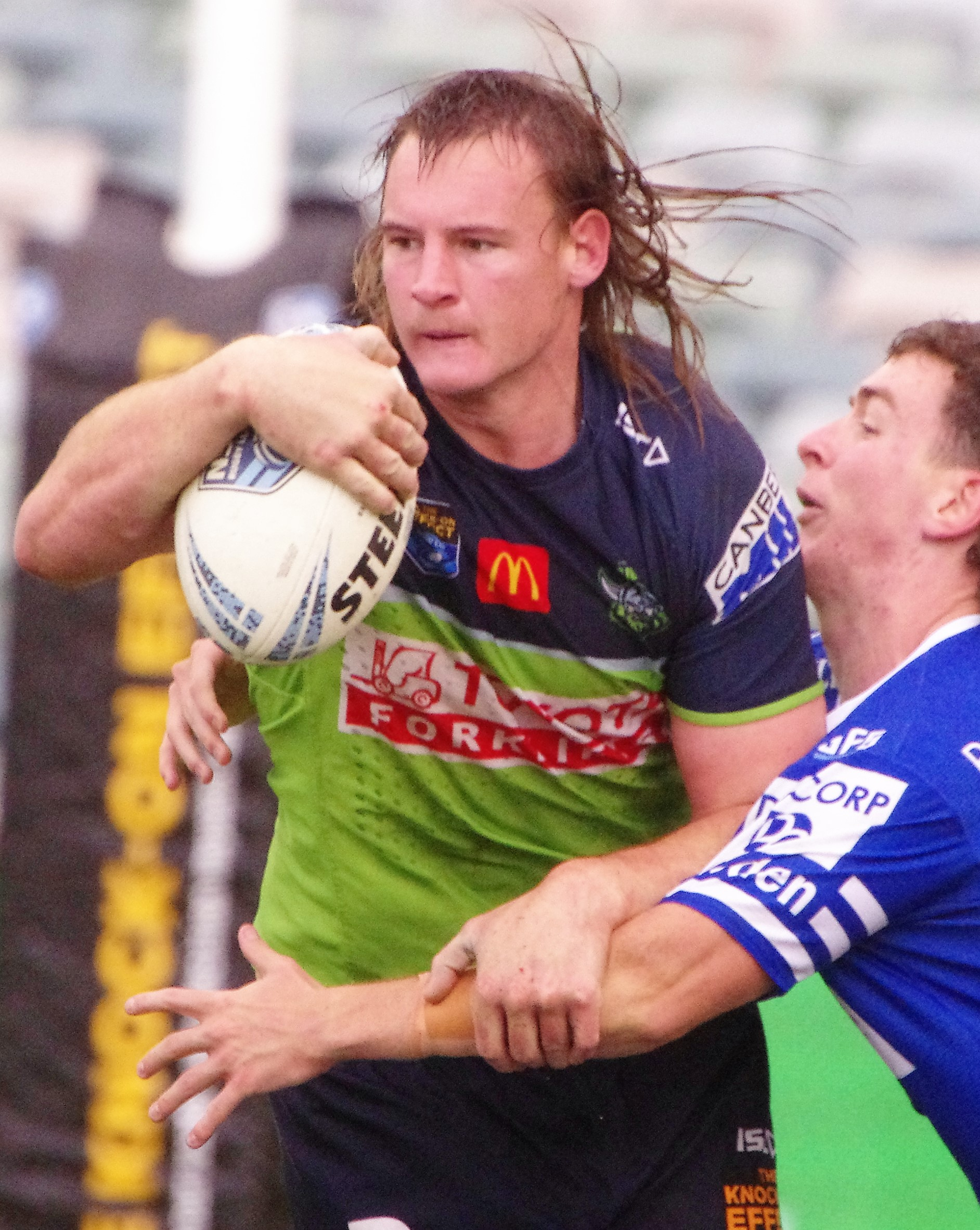

Personal information
- Full name: Jordan Martin
- Born: 27 March 2000 (age 26) Casino, New South Wales, Australia
- Height: 187 cm (6 ft 2 in)
- Weight: 103 kg (16 st 3 lb)

Playing information
- Position: Second-row
Club
Years	Team	Pld	T	G	FG	P
2024	Canberra Raiders	1	0	0	0	0

Jordan Martin (born 27 March 2000) is an Australian rugby league footballer who last played as a second-row for the Canberra Raiders in the NRL.

== Background ==
Martin was born in Casino, New South Wales.

== Playing career ==
Martin played his junior career with the Narooma Devils who dominated the competition through the junior grades during his time there. In 2018, he was signed by the Canberra Raiders on a development contract.

In 2023, Martin made 11 appearances in Canberra's NSW Cup side before suffering an ACL injury which ruled him out for the remainder of the season. In 2024, Martin made his first grade debut in his side's 16−6 loss to the Melbourne Storm at Melbourne Rectangular Stadium in round 17 of the 2024 NRL season. Martin made no appearances for Canberra in the 2025 NRL season. On 30 September, he was released by Canberra after not being offered a new contract.
