= Moruya Sharks =

Australian rugby league club, based in Moruya, NSW

Moruya Sharks RL
Club information
- Full name: Moruya Rugby League Football Club
- Colours: Black; White; Sky Blue
- Founded: 1925; 100 years ago

Current details
- Ground(s): Ack Weymam Oval, Moruya
- Competition: Group 16 Rugby League
- 2018: 3rd

Records
- Premierships: 5 (1989, 1998, 2013, 2015, 2016)
- Runners-up: 5 (1966, 1969, 1997, 2004, 2012)
- Minor premierships: 6 (1998, 2012, 2013, 2014, 2015, 2016)

Moruya Rugby League Football Club is an Australian rugby league football club based in Moruya, New South Wales formed in 1925. They conduct teams for both Juniors & Seniors competitions.

== Notable Juniors ==
- Michael Weyman
- Rhys Kennedy
- Jarrad Kennedy
- Tim Weyman

== History ==
=== Beginnings ===
Moruya played a match in June 1925 against Braidwood. The two towns met again for a rugby league match in July 1926, playing a challenge match for the Lord Mayor's Cup. The same opponents played for the Retail Traders' Cup in September 1927. In August 1928, Moruya defeated Milton to retain the Toohey Cup. In 1929, Moruya entered in a Far South Coast rugby league competition with Bemboka, Cobargo, Eden, Pambula, Tathra and two Bega teams, the Federals and Waratahs.

During 1930, Moruya participated in the competition with Bermagui, Bodalla, Tilba and their opponents on 31 May, Narooma. In 1934, Moruya hosted a weekend knock-out tournament in early June. Later that month the Moruya team of Burke, Crapp, Cooper, Cowdroy, Heffernan, Hopwood (Player-Coach), Kelsey, Malcolm, Donnelly, Chowying, Brogan, Cowdroy and Bartlett travelled to Braidwood for a challenge cup match. They met with a heavy defeat. In August 1938, Moruya drew two-all with Bodalla in a semi-final of the Tilba District Rugby League competition.

== Sources ==
- Bega District News - Microfilm of past issues available at the State Library of NSW.
- Rugby League Week - Past issues available in journal format at the State Library of NSW.
- Group 16 Rugby League - Premiership list.
