= Merimbula-Pambula Bulldogs =

Australian rugby league club, based in Pambula, NSW

Merimbula-Pambula RL
Club information
- Full name: Merimbula-Pambula Rugby League Football Club
- Nickname(s): Bulldogs
- Colours: Blue; White
- Founded: 1924; 101 years ago
- Exited: 1954; 71 years ago
- Readmitted: 1966; 59 years ago
- Website: http://websites.sportstg.com/club_info.cgi?c=0-2395-21979-0-0 https://m.facebook.com/MPBfootballclub/

details
- Ground(s): Pambula Sporting Complex, Pambula
- Competition: Group 16 Rugby League
- 2018: 4th

Records
- Premierships: 7 (1927, 1936 (P), 1937 (POB), 1938 (M), 1968, 1980, 1993)
- Runners-up: 7 (1929 (P), 1932 (M), 1933 (P), 1934 (P), 1938 (P), 1940 (M), 1987)
- Minor premierships: 1 (1933 (P))

Merimbula-Pambula Rugby League Football Club is an Australian rugby league football club based in New South Wales formed in 1924. They conduct teams for both Juniors & Seniors competitions. They participate in the Group 16 Rugby League competition in the south-east corner of New South Wales.

The combined team of Pambula-Merimbula won the Far South Coast competition in 1927. During the 1930s, the two towns competed separately.

In the bunny seasons following World War II, Pambula participated in First and or Reserve Grade competitions, but Merimbula only fielded a team in 1953. Between 1955 and 1965 neither town entered Group 16, apart from Pambula in 1962. Pambula was revived in 1966 and won a premiership in 1968. The club missed the 2012 and 1974 seasons, before entering as Merimbula from 1975.

== Notable Juniors ==
- Euan Aitken
- Wayne Collins
- Rhys Schafer - Albion park, Wollongong touch association

== History ==
Rugby Union was played by Pambula as early as 1912, with a team challenging the Bega Blues for the Rodd & Chegg Cup in a July encounter. In 1924, a Pambula team challenged Bega for the Hull Cup. In 1925, Pambula entered a Rugby League competition with five other teams: Candelo, Eden, Wyndham and two from Bega.
