= Narooma Devils =

Australian rugby league club, based in Narooma, NSW

Narooma Devils JRL
Club information
- Full name: Narooma Devils Junior Rugby League Football Club
- Colours: Red; White
- Founded: 1929; 96 years ago

Current details
- Ground(s): Bill Smythe Memorial Oval, Narooma
- Chairman: Jaimie Wright
- Competition: Group 16 Rugby League
- 2022: 8th of 9

Records
- Premierships: 6 Group & 3 Sub-Group (1999, 2003, 2004, 2005, 2009, 2012 Group & 1951, 1952, 1955)
- Runners-up: 2 (both Group) (1985, 2014)
- Minor premierships: 5 Group & 2 Sub-group (1990, 1999, 2003, 2004, 2009 Group & 1952, 1955 Sub-group)

Narooma Devils Junior Rugby League Football Club is an Australian rugby league football club based in Narooma, New South Wales formed in 1929. They conduct teams for both Junior & Senior competitions from Under 6's to First Grade.

== Notable Juniors ==
- Michael Lett (2005-11 Sydney Roosters, St George Illawarra Dragons & Canterbury Bulldogs)
- Chris Houston (2007- St George Illawarra Dragons & Newcastle Knights)
- Teig Wilton (2020- Cronulla Sharks)
- Noah Martin (rugby league) (2025- Canberra Raiders)
- Jordan Martin (2024- Canberra Raiders)

== Playing Record ==
Playing record compiled from scores published in the Rugby League Week and local newspapers.

| Year | Group | Ladder Position | Points | Final Position | Report |
|---|---|---|---|---|---|
| 1929 | Tilba District | | | | |
| 1930 | Narooma Group | | | | CC |
| 1931 | Tilba District | | | | |
| 1933 | Tilba District | | | | |
| 1935 | Tilba District | | | Semi-Finalist | |
| 1936 | Maslin Shield | | | Result | DA |
| 1938 | Far South Coast | 3 | 5 | | |
| 1946 | Far South Coast | | | | |
| 1947 | Northern Group 16 | 7 | 16 | | |
| 1948 | Northern Group 16 | | 19 | Finalist | BDN |
| 1949 | Northern Group 16 | | | | |
| 1950 | Far South Coast | | | Semi-Finalist | |
| 1951 | Northern Group 16 | | | Premiers | BDN |
| 1952 | Northern Group 16 | 1 | 17 | Premiers | BDN BDN |
| 1953 | Northern Group 16 | | | | |
| 1955 | Northern Group 16 | 1 | | Premiers | ME BDN |
| 1956 | Northern Group 16 | Top 3 | 16 | Semi-Finalist | ME |
| 1959 | Group 16 | | | Finalist | BDN |
| 1961 | Group 16 | 2 | | Finalist | BDN |
| 1962 | Group 16 | | | | |
| 1965 | Group 16 | 8 | 2 | | |
| 1966 | Group 16 | 8 | | | |
| 1967 | Group 16 | 7 | 13 | | |
| 1968 | Group 16 | 6 | 14 | | |
| 1969 | Group 16 | 2 | 20 | Finalist | BDN |
| 1970 | Group 16 | 6 | 13 | | |
| 1974 | Group 16 | 7 | 8 | | |
| 1976 | Group 16 | | | | |
| 1977 | Group 16 | | | | |
| 1978 | Group 16 | 4 | 30 | | |
| 1979 | Group 16 | 5 | 24 | | |
| 1980 | Group 16 | 5 | 20 | | |
| 1981 | Group 16 | 6 | 17 | | |
| 1982 | Group 16 | 4 | 21 | | |
| 1983 | Group 16 | 9 | 6 | | |
| 1984 | Group 16 | 9 | 10 | | |
| 1985 | Group 16 | 3 | 25 | Grand Finalists | BDN |
| 1987 | Group 16 | 4 | 15 | | |
| 1988 | Group 16 | 8 | 0 | | |
| 1989 | Group 16 | 8 | 4 | | |
| 1990 | Group 16 | 1 | 24 | Finalist | IM |
| 1991 | Group 16 | 8 | | | |
| 1993 | Group 16 | 8 | 2 | | |
| 1994 | Group 16 | | | | |
| 1995 | Group 16 | 8 | 4 | | |
| 1996 | Group 16 | 8 | | | |
| 1997 | Group 16 | 5 | 7 | | |
| 1998 | Group 16 | 4 | 10 | Semi-Finalist | BDN |
| 1999 | Group 16 | 1 | 37 | Premiers | BDN |
| 2000 | Group 16 | 4 | 18 | Semi-Finalist | |
| 2001 | Group 16 | 6 | 0 | | |
| 2002 | Group 16 | 2 | 14 | Finalist | BDN |
| 2003 | Group 16 | 1 | 28 | Clayton Cup winners | BDN |
| 2004 | Group 16 | 1 | 24 | Premiers | |
| 2005 | Group 16 | 2 | 22 | Premiers | |
| 2006 | Group 16 | 4 | 16 | Finalist | |
| 2007 | Group 16 | 2 | 20 | Finalist | BT |
| 2009 | Group 16 | 1 | 22 | Premiers | |
| 2010 | Group 16 | 5 | 14 | | |
| 2011 | Group 16 | 5 | 8 | | |
| 2012 | Group 16 | 2 | 22 | Premiers | NN |
| 2013 | Group 16 | 6 | 10 | | |
| 2014 | Group 16 | 3 | 22 | Grand Finalists | NN |
| 2015 | Group 16 | 6 | 9 | | |
| 2016 | Group 16 | 5 | 15 | | |
| 2017 | Group 16 | 7 | 9 | | |
| 2018 | Group 16 | 6 | 10 | | |
