= Bombala Times =

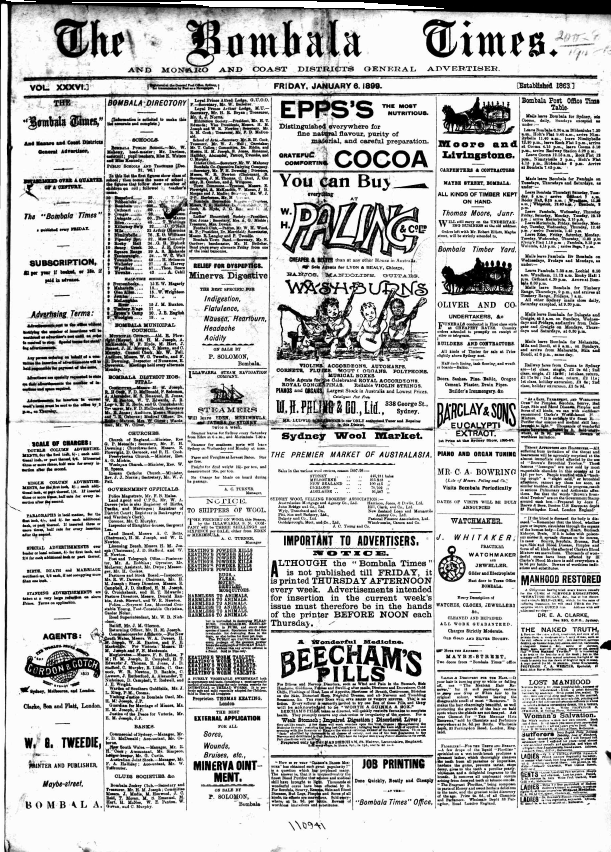
Front page image of The Bombala Times and Monaro and Coasts District General Advertiser

The Bombala Times and Monaro and Coast Districts General Advertiser was an English language newspaper published in Bombala, New South Wales, Australia that was established in 1863. It now normally referred to as the Bombala Times.

== History ==
The Bombala Times and Monaro and Coast Districts General Advertiser was a weekly publication that began in 1863. The publication consisted of local news, advertising and serial fiction. In 1911 the paper absorbed The Bombala herald and Delegate, Cooma, Eden and Coast Districts general advertiser. In 2021 the Bombala Times ceased publication.

== Digitisation ==
The various versions of the paper have been digitised as part of the Australian Newspapers Digitisation Program project hosted by the National Library of Australia.

== See also ==
- List of newspapers in New South Wales

== Bibliography ==
- Holden, W Sprague 1961, Australia goes to press, Melbourne University Press, Melbourne.
- Mayer, Henry 1964, The press in Australia, Lansdowne Press, Melbourne.
- Walker, R B 1976, The newspaper press in New South Wales 1803-1920, Sydney University Press, Sydney.
