= Michael Weyman =

Australia international rugby league footballer

Mick "Horse" Weyman
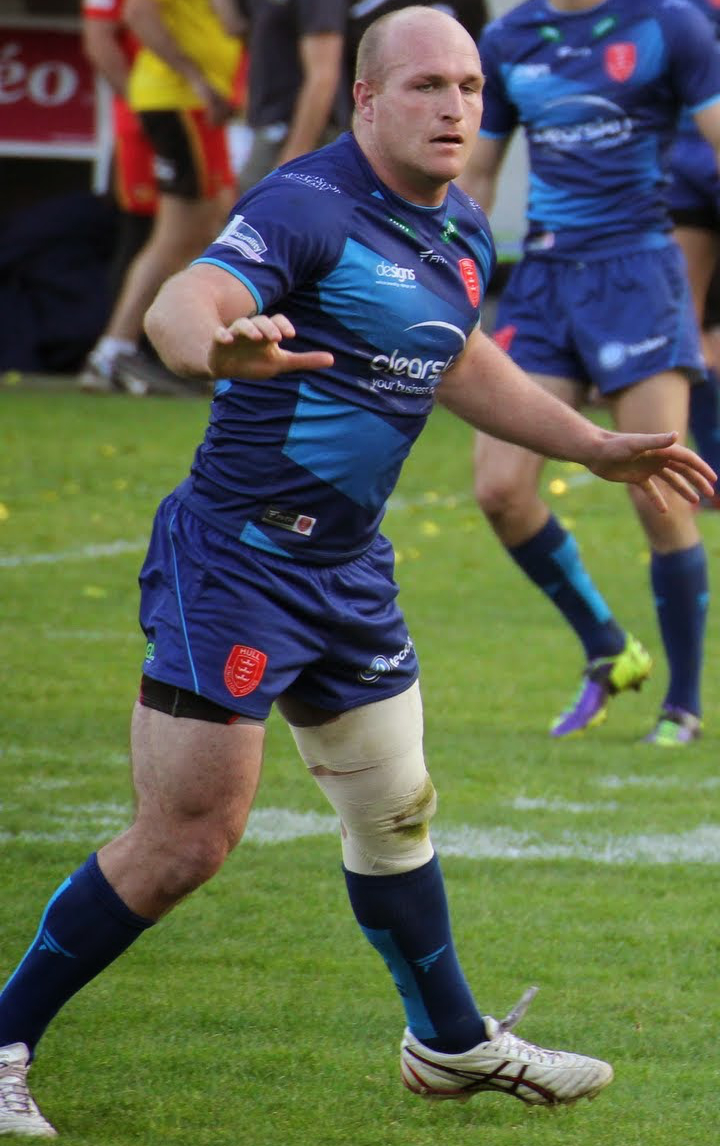

Personal information
- Full name: Michael Weyman
- Born: 13 September 1984 (age 42) Moruya, New South Wales, Australia

Playing information
- Height: 185 cm (6 ft 1 in)
- Weight: 113 kg (17 st 11 lb)
- Position: Prop
Club
Years	Team	Pld	T	G	FG	P
2003–08	Canberra Raiders	47	3	0	0	12
2009–13	St. George Illawarra	94	9	0	0	36
2014–15	Hull Kingston Rovers	24	7	0	0	28
	Total	165	19	0	0	76
Representative
Years	Team	Pld	T	G	FG	P
2009–12	NSW Country	2	0	0	0	0
2009–10	New South Wales	4	0	0	0	0
2010	Australia	1	0	0	0	0

Michael Weyman (born 13 September 1984) is an Australian former professional rugby league footballer. Weyman is the older brother of former Cronulla-Sutherland Sharks player, Tim Weyman.

== Playing career ==
Born in Moruya, New South Wales, Weyman played his junior football for the Moruya Sharks. While attending Carroll College Broulee in 2001 and Erindale College in 2002, Weyman was selected for the Australian Schoolboys team and was captain of the team. In 2002 and 2003, Weyman was selected for the Junior Kangaroos team and played for the New South Wales U19s in 2003.

=== National Rugby League ===
Weyman was signed by the Canberra Raiders. In round 10 of the 2003 NRL season he made his NRL debut for Canberra against the Penrith Panthers.

In May 2008, Weyman signed a two-year deal with the St. George Illawarra Dragons starting in 2009, despite being offered a one-year extension with the Raiders. In 2008, Weyman was suspended for six weeks after punching Gold Coast Titans forward Daniel Conn, breaking Conn's nose and leading the media to brand Weyman as a "thug". The incident was the low-point of Weyman's 2008 season and he played only seven NRL matches for Canberra that year.

In 2009, Weyman was selected for Country in the City vs Country Origin match on 8 May 2009. Later that month Weyman was named in the 17-man squad to represent New South Wales in the opening game of the 2009 State of Origin series. Weyman made his Origin debut on 3 June 2009, in Melbourne at Etihad Stadium. Weyman missed the final game of the Origin series with an ankle injury.

For the 2010 ANZAC Test, Weyman was selected to play for Australia from the interchange bench in their victory against New Zealand. Weyman played 2 games for New South Wales in the 2010 State of Origin series. Weyman played in the 2010 NRL Grand Final for St. George Illawarra against the Sydney Roosters. Weyman and Conn went head to head again in the Grand Final with Conn being put on report for a late shot on Weyman in the first half. St. George would win the decider 32–8 at ANZ Stadium.

In February 2011, Weyman played in the 2011 World Club Challenge for the St. George Illawarra Dragons against the Wigan Warriors, the Dragons winning 21–15. In an interview with the NRL regarding Weyman, Dragons coach Wayne Bennett said "I'd have him in any team I coached, I wouldn't have a hesitation."

In 2012, Weyman tore his anterior cruciate ligament in his right knee and had to have reconstructive surgery. He was ruled out for the rest of the 2012 NRL season having only played 10 games.

=== Super League ===
In July 2013, Weyman signed a two-year deal with Hull Kingston Rovers for the 2014 Super League season. During the 2014 season, he scored four tries in four consecutive games which placed him 2nd in the Hull Kingston Rovers try charts for a brief period of time. Weyman retired in March 2015.
