= Corunna, New South Wales =

Corunna
- Town
- Coordinates: 36°16′54″S 150°6′4″E
- Country: Australia
- State: New South Wales
- Region: South Coast
- LGA: Eurobodalla Shire
- Location: 357 km (222 mi) SSW of Sydney; 53 km (33 mi) SE of Moruya

Government
  - State electorate: Bega
  - Federal division: Eden-Monaro

Population
  - Total: 63 (2016 census)
- Postcode: 2546

Corunna is a village in Eurobodalla Shire on the South Coast of New South Wales. It is located 357 km south of Sydney, and 53 km south of Moruya.

The population of Corunna and the surrounding area was 63 at the 2016 census.
