= Harbour View Hotel =

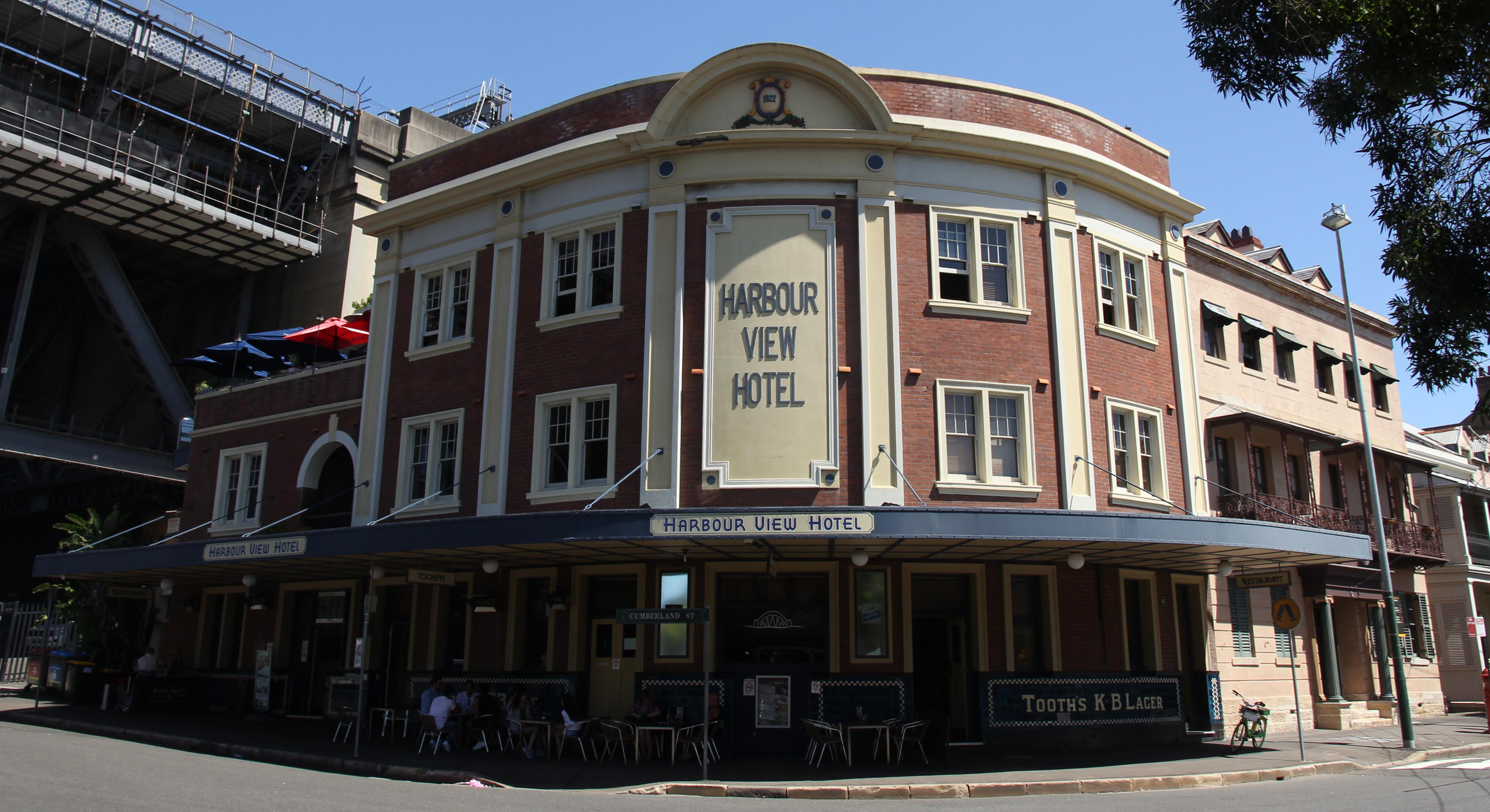
- Harbour View Hotel, pictured in 2019

- Location within Sydney Location within Australia
- 33.8568°S 151.2074°E
- Location: 18 Lower Fort Street, Millers Point, City of Sydney, New South Wales, Australia

History
- Built: 1922–1923

Site notes
- Architect(s): Prevost & Waterman
- Architectural style: Inter-war Free Classical

New South Wales Heritage Register
- Official name: Harbour View Hotel and site
- Type: state heritage (built)
- Designated: 2 April 1999
- Reference no.: 634
- Type: Hotel
- Category: Commercial

Harbour View Hotel is a heritage-listed hotel at 18 Lower Fort Street, in the inner city Sydney suburb of Millers Point, New South Wales, Australia. It was designed by Prevost & Waterman and built from 1922 to 1923. It is privately owned. It was added to the New South Wales State Heritage Register on 2 April 1999.

== History ==
The first Harbour View Hotel was built in 1843 on the opposite corner. The present site was occupied by "Oliffe Terrace". In 1913 both sites were resumed. By 1922 the terraces had been demolished, and by 1924 the present hotel building had been constructed. Construction of the hotel was funded by Tooth and Co., under a 50-year lease. In 1927 the Sydney Harbour Trust assumed control of the site from the Resumed Properties Dept. Licencees of the hotel included William Ireland 1924-1941 and Gavin Miller 1941–1949. In 1936 the Maritime Services Board succeeded the SHT as owner. The 50-year lease expired in 1971 and the MSB transferred ownership of the hotel to Tooth & Co. The hotel experienced a gradual decline in its patronage, and in 1998 it was again sold.

== Description ==
The Harbour View Hotel is a three-storey (plus basement) masonry hotel structure with remnant outbuildings and exterior walls. The most prominent element on the site is the three-storey hotel, which strongly addresses the curved corner of Lower Fort Street. The well-composed Inter-war Free Classical style facade with curved centre piece anchors the hotel building to the site and provides space between the two storey attached columns for sub-dominant groupings of pairs of double hung windows. The fenestration comprises multi-pane double-hung windows composed in pairs with projecting rendered frames, a deep rendered band with an entablature featuring a semi-circular pediment at the corner, and terminating on the top band with circular, raised decorative elements. The facade below awning features highly glazed tilling with encaustic signage to both street frontages. The eastern, or Sydney Harbour Bridge, section of the building is two storey at the street with an open deck and a set of rooms to the rear. Internally the lower floor has been extensively modified with the public and saloon bars opened to form one room and the dining room used as a bistro. The upper floors are relatively intact with original fabric and layout. Building development covers most of the site except for an open side service access area to the east,.

The construction methods employed in the Harbour View Hotel were traditional and the structural design conservative. Load-bearing stone and brick, with an internal render finish, forms the main basis of structure throughout the hotel.

=== Modifications and dates ===
- 1923: general repairs
- 1940: alterations to ground floor lavatory and cellar
- 1953: major alterations to ground floor
- 1986: major alterations to ground floor
- 1992: alterations to ground floor

== Heritage listing ==
The Harbour View Hotel was one of a small number of pubs constructed in the Millers Point area following demolition by the Sydney Harbour Trust after land was resumed for the construction of the Sydney Harbour Bridge. In an area of trade facilities and industrialisation, hotels formed an important social role. The hotel's location, strategically sited at the south western end of the Harbour Bridge, is a physical reminder of the importance of meeting places associated with movement to and from the city. It is representative of many such buildings servicing the early local labour force and residents during the early decades of the 20th century. Aesthetically, the hotel exhibits consistent Inter-War period form and detailing and is mostly intact externally and internally. The structure is designed in the Inter-war Free Classical style. The hotel is strongly sited and curved around the corner with a classical banded and face brick masonry element. It makes a significant contribution to the local streetscape especially at its curved section of the site. The hotel has significance as part of a small number of popst-1920s purpose designed hotels that have survived in the city area which reflect the social character of the area during the early to mid decades of the 20th century. Of rare significance is the glazed tiles with signage to the lower portion below the awning level façade as few such examples of tiled signage remain in the CBD.

Harbour View Hotel was listed on the New South Wales State Heritage Register on 2 April 1999 having satisfied the following criteria.

The place is important in demonstrating the course, or pattern, of cultural or natural history in New South Wales.

The Harbour View Hotel has historical significance through its link to the early Harbour View Hotel and as a significant social institution dating from the Inter-War Period. It has further significance through its association with the land reclamation programs of the post-plague era and the establishment of the Sydney Harbour Trust. The building of the hotel represented a new phase of development in the Millers/Dawes Point precinct and it was associated for many years with Tooth & Co., a major brewer and lessee of hotels throughout the state in the 20th century.

The place is important in demonstrating aesthetic characteristics and/or a high degree of creative or technical achievement in New South Wales.

The Harbour View Hotel has aesthetic significance as a fine example of an Inter-War Free Classical corner hotel building, well designed and executed and located in a precinct in which few such buildings have survived. The hotel was sited to take advantage of the once extensive harbour views and the sharp corner of the intersection on which it stands. The building is a landmark in the area and is a strong visual streetscape element.

The place has a strong or special association with a particular community or cultural group in New South Wales for social, cultural or spiritual reasons.

The Harbour View Hotel has social significance as a major social institution in the area for over 70 years. Through its link with the earlier Harbour View Hotel, it has provided a continuity of social venue and accommodation for the people of the area for over 150 years. The hotel also has a value as a link to the post-plague land reclamation programs which changed forever the face of the Millers/Dawes Point area.

The place has potential to yield information that will contribute to an understanding of the cultural or natural history of New South Wales.

The Harbour View Hotel has technical significance for its demonstration of Inter-War building techniques and architectural design. It allows investigation into the processes and difficulties of masonry construction in the 1920s and interpretation of an inner-city working class hotel. This site (assuming intact archaeological deposits) has been assessed as having moderate to high significance based on its value under the historic and scientific assessment criteria. However, the site has limited potential to yield archaeological deposits which are of high cultural significance. The reason for this is that site development processes, particularly the construction of the current hotel, are likely to have heavily impacted upon the deposits which are most likely to have provided new information about the site. The result is that the overall site significance is reduced by the low potential for intact archaeological remains.

The place possesses uncommon, rare or endangered aspects of the cultural or natural history of New South Wales.

Within the Sydney Metropolitan Area, the Harbour View Hotel is of relative rarity, as few hotels of similar design and construction have survived, particularly in the Millers/Dawes Point precinct. Within a state context, a number of similar hotels have survived, particularly in country towns.

The place is important in demonstrating the principal characteristics of a class of cultural or natural places/environments in New South Wales.

The Harbour View Hotel is a good representative example of an Inter-War corner hotel, executed in the Free Classical style, well constructed and detailed.

== See also ==
- Australian non-residential architectural styles
- List of pubs in Sydney
