= The Southern Record and Advertiser =

The Southern Record and Advertiser was a weekly newspaper published in Candelo, New South Wales, Australia from 1910 until 1938. It was published after the amalgamation of Candelo Guardian and the Candelo and Eden Union newspapers.

== History ==
The Candelo and Eden Union was first published on 18 May 1882 by Lawrence John O'Toole. A.H. Schuback became the sole proprietor of the Union in 1899, however in 1904 he left it to start publishing the Candelo Guardian in competition. In 1910 the two newspapers merged and were published as The Southern Record and Advertiser. The Southern Record was published until 1938 when it was merged with the Bega District News.

== Digitisation ==
The paper has been digitised as part of the Australian Newspapers Digitisation Program project of the National Library of Australia.

== See also ==
- List of newspapers in Australia
- List of newspapers in New South Wales
