= Rhys Kennedy =

Australian rugby league footballer

Rhys "Rooster" Kennedy
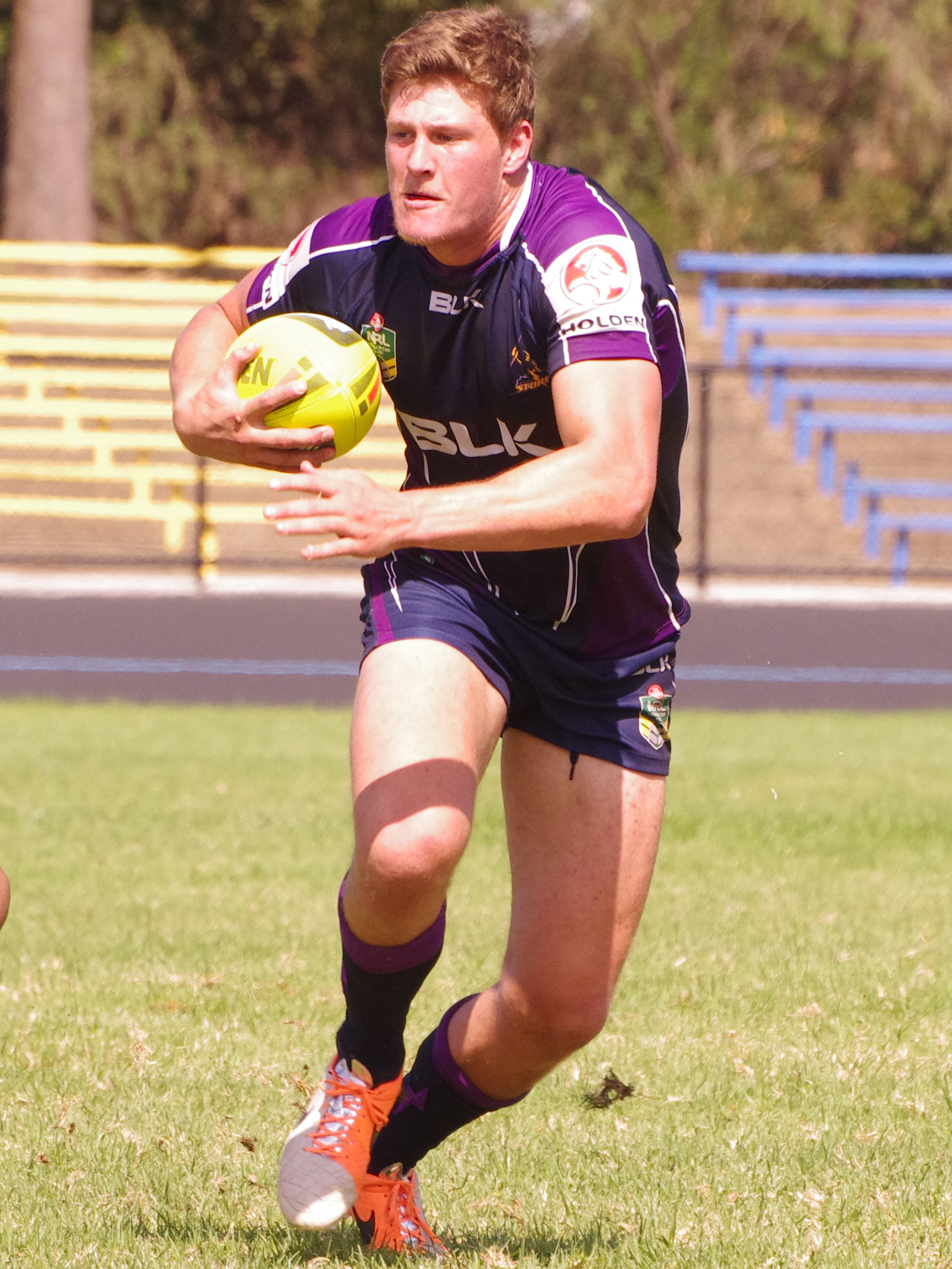

Personal information
- Full name: Rhys Kennedy
- Born: 11 October 1994 (age 32) Moruya, New South Wales, Australia
- Height: 6 ft 6 in (1.98 m)
- Weight: 17 st 7 lb (111 kg)

Playing information
- Position: Prop
Club
Years	Team	Pld	T	G	FG	P
2019	South Sydney	2	0	0	0	0
2019–22	Brisbane Broncos	47	3	0	0	12
2023	Hull Kingston Rovers	26	1	0	0	4
2024	London Broncos	27	1	0	0	4
	Total	102	5	0	0	20
- Source: As of 16 February 2026

Rhys Kennedy (born 11 October 1994) is a professional rugby league footballer who plays as a prop forward, most recently for the London Broncos in the Super League.

He played for the South Sydney Rabbitohs and Brisbane Broncos in the National Rugby League (NRL).

== Background ==
Kennedy was born in Moruya, New South Wales, Australia. Rhys Kennedy played his junior football with the Moruya Sharks. Kennedy is of Swiss descent.

== Playing career ==
Kennedy played for the Melbourne Storm in the National Youth Competition in 2014.

In 2016, Kennedy played for the Illawarra Cutters in the Intrust Super Premiership NSW competition.

In 2017, Kennedy joined foundation club North Sydney who were the feeder club side for NRL side South Sydney. Kennedy spent two seasons playing with Norths in the Intrust Super Premiership NSW.

=== South Sydney Rabbitohs ===
On March 31, 2019, in round 3 of the 2019 NRL season, Kennedy made his NRL debut for South Sydney against the Gold Coast Titans.

=== Brisbane Broncos ===
On June 25, Kennedy signed for the Brisbane Broncos in a deal that ran until the end of the 2020 season. The contract was later upgraded until the end of the 2022 NRL season. Standing 198 cm and weighing 110 kg, Kennedy was at the time, the tallest player in the Brisbane squad.

=== Hull KR ===
On 12 August 2023, Kennedy played for Hull Kingston Rovers in their 17-16 golden point extra-time loss to Leigh in the Challenge Cup final.

Kennedy played a total of 26 games for Hull Kingston Rovers in the 2023 Super League season as the club finished fourth on the table and qualified for the playoffs.

=== London Broncos ===
On 10 Nov 2023 it was reported that he had signed for the London Broncos in the Super League.
