= Tathra Sea Eagles =

Australian rugby league club, based in Tathra, NSW

Club information
- Full name: Tathra Sea Eagles RLFC
- Colours: Maroon; White
- Founded: 1926; 100 years ago
- Exited: 1979; 47 years ago
- Readmitted: 1996; 30 years ago

details
- Ground: Tathra Beach Country Club, Tathra
- CEO: Scott Meaker
- Coach: James Scott
- Manager: Matthew Hughes
- Captain: James Bower-Scott & Mitch Carter
- Competition: Group 16 Rugby League
- 2024: 5th Place

Records
- Premierships: 6 (1951, 1952, 1953, 2019, 2025, 2026)
- Runners-up: 9 (1954, 1955, 1961, 1962, 1963, 1972, 2001, 2002, 2022, 2023)
- Minor premierships: 6 (1953, 1954, 1961, 1963, 1965, 1972)

Tathra Rugby League Football Club is an Australian rugby league football club in Tathra, New South Wales, formed in 1926. It has teams for both juniors and seniors competitions.

Two early records name players in the Pambula team to play Tathra in June and August 1927.

In 1929, Tathra played a match against Candelo.

In the 2018 season, the club fielded Reserve Grade and Ladies League Tag teams. The club was most recently in First Grade from 2009 to 2014.

In 2019, the club won the Group 16 Premiership for the first time in 66 years.

== Notable Juniors ==
- Adam Elliot (2016- Newcastle Knights)
