= Wayne Collins (rugby league) =

Australian rugby league footballer

Personal information
- Full name: Wayne Collins
- Born: 24 June 1967 (age 57); Australia

Playing information
- Position: Hooker
Club
| Years | Team | Pld | T | G | FG | P |
|---|---|---|---|---|---|---|
| 1988–90 | Canberra Raiders | 29 | 1 | 0 | 0 | 4 |
| 1991–94 | St. George Dragons | 68 | 5 | 0 | 0 | 20 |
| 1995–96 | South Queensland Crushers | 9 | 1 | 0 | 0 | 4 |
| 1997 | Leeds | 29 | 5 | 0 | 0 | 20 |
| 1998 | Dewsbury | 8 | 0 | 0 | 0 | 0 |
| | Total | 143 | 12 | 0 | 0 | 48 |
- Source: Whiticker/Hudson

Wayne Collins (born 24 June 1967) was an Australian rugby league footballer who played in the 1980s and 1990s. He played for Canberra, St. George and South Queensland in the NSWRL and ARL competitions. He also played for Leeds and Dewsbury in England.

== Early career ==
He had played junior rugby league for the Merimbula-Pambula Bulldogs, during which time he was a state representative.

== Playing career ==
A former Canberra Raiders lower grade hooker, Collins cemented a first grade spot after moving to St. George in 1991. He played with the St. George for four seasons between 1991 and 1994 which included two grand Final appearances in 1992 and 1993. Collins later joined the South Queensland Crushers in 1995 and stayed until 1996 before finishing his career at Leeds in 1998.

== Coaching career ==
Collins was previously an assistant coach at the Canberra Raiders, Penrith Panthers and the South Sydney Rabbitohs and was the head coach of the St. George Illawarra Jersey Flegg side.

In 2020, he signed on with the Wests Tigers as the head coach of the NSW Cup side.

In October 2021, Collins was signed by St Marys Saints to coach their Ron Massey Cup team in the 2022 season.
